= List of Tuscan consorts =

The Grand Duchy of Tuscany was founded in 1569. It succeeded the Duchy of Florence. The grand duchy was initially ruled by the House of Medici, until their extinction in 1737. The grand duchy passed to the House of Lorraine, and then, to its cadet branch, the House of Habsburg-Lorraine. The House of Habsburg-Lorraine ruled Tuscany from 1765 to 1801, and then 1814 to 1859.

== Margravines consort of Tuscany ==
=== House of Bonifacii, 812–931 ===
Picture	Name	Father	Birth	Marriage	Became Consort	Ceased to be Consort	Death	Spouse
The names of the wives of Boniface I are not known.
	Bertha	-	-	-	828 husband's accession	834 husband's deposition	-	Boniface I
The names of the wives of Aganus are not known.
	Anonsuara	-	-	-	847 husband's accession	-		Adalbert I
	Rothilde of Spoleto	Guy I of Spoleto (Widonids)	-	863		886 husband's death	-	Adalbert I
	Bertha of Lotharingia	Lothair II of Lotharingia (Carolingian)	863	895/898		10/15 September 915 husband's death	8 March 925	Adalbert II
	Marozia of Tusculum	Theophylact I, Count of Tusculum (Tusculani)	863 – 8 March 925	925		929 husband's death	932/937	Guy

=== House of Arles, 931–1001 ===
Picture	Name	Father	Birth	Marriage	Became Consort	Ceased to be Consort	Death	Spouse
	Willa of Burgundy	Rudolph I of Burgundy (Elder Welf)	-	912	931 husband's accession	936 husband's deposition	after 936	Boso
	Willa of Spoleto	Boniface I of Spoleto	-	around 936	936 husband's accession	13 February 962 husband's deposition	-	Hubert
	Judith	-	-	-	961 husband's accession	21 December 1001 husband's death	-	Hugh

=== House of Bologna, 1004–1011 ===
- Interregnum 1011–1014

=== Unknown House, 1014–1027 ===
Picture	Name	Father	Birth	Marriage	Became Consort	Ceased to be Consort	Death	Spouse
	Waldrada	Guglielmo	-	-	1014 husband's accession	1027 husband's death	-	Rainier

=== House of Canossa, 1027–1115 ===
Picture	Name	Father	Birth	Marriage	Became Consort	Ceased to be Consort	Death	Spouse
	Richelida of Bergamo	Giselbert II, Count of Bergamo	late 10th century	before 1015	1027 husband's accession	after 1034		Boniface IV
	Beatrice of Bar	Frederick II, Duke of Upper Lorraine (Ardennes-Bar)	1017	1037		6 May 1052 husband's death	18 April 1076	Boniface IV

- Interregnum 1115–1120

=== House of Scheiern, 1120–1127 ===
- Interregnum 1127–1135

=== House of Sponheim, 1135–1137 ===
None

=== House of Welf, 1137–1139 ===
Picture	Name	Father	Birth	Marriage	Became Consort	Ceased to be Consort	Death	Spouse
	Gertrude of Süpplingenburg	Lothair III, Holy Roman Emperor (Süpplingenburg)	18 April 1115	29 May 1127	1137 husband's accession	20 October 1139 husband's death	18 April 1143	Henry

=== House of Welf, 1152–1173 ===
Picture	Name	Father	Birth	Marriage	Became Consort	Ceased to be Consort	Death	Spouse
	Uta of Calw	Godfrey of Calw, Count Palatine of the Rhine (Calw)	1115/1120	by January 1133	October 1152 husband's accession	1160 their son became Margrave	1197	Welf VI (1st reign)
	Uta of Calw	Godfrey of Calw, Count Palatine of the Rhine (Calw)	1115/1120	by January 1133	11/12 September 1167 husband's accession	1173 husband lost the March	1197	Welf VI (2nd reign)

- Interregnum 1173–1195

=== House of Hohenstaufen, 1195–1197 ===
Picture	Name	Father	Birth	Marriage	Became Consort	Ceased to be Consort	Death	Spouse
	Irene Angelina	Isaac II Angelos (Angelos)	1177/1181	25 May 1197		1197 husband ceased to be Margrave	27 August 1208	Philip

== Ladies consort of Florence ==
=== House of Medici, 1434–1531 ===
Picture	Name	Father	Birth	Marriage	Became Consort	Death	Spouse
	Contessina de' Bardi	Alessandro de' Bardi (Bardi)	1390	1416	6 October 1434 husband's accession	October 1473	Cosimo de' Medici
	Lucrezia Tornabuoni	Francesco Tornabuoni	1425	3 June 1444	1 August 1464 husband's accession	25 March 1482	Pietro de' Medici
	Clarice Orsini	Giacomo Orsini (Orsini)	1453	7 February 1469	2 December 1469 husband's accession	29 July 1487	Lorenzo de' Medici
	Alfonsina Orsini	Roberto Orsini (Orsini)	1472	March 1488	9 April 1492 husband's accession	7 February 1520 yet exiled in 1494	Pietro de' Medici
Republic restored 1494–1512
	Madeleine de la Tour d'Auvergne	John III, Count of Auvergne (La Tour d'Auvergne)	1501	5 May 1518		28 April 1519	Lorenzo II de' Medici
Republic restored 1527–1530

== Duchesses consort of Florence ==
=== House of Medici, 1531–1569 ===
Picture	Name	Father	Birth	Marriage	Became Consort	Ceased to be Consort	Death	Spouse
	Margaret of Austria	Charles V, Holy Roman Emperor (Habsburg)	28 December 1522	18 January 1536		6 January 1537 husband's death	18 January 1586	Alessandro de' Medici
	Eleanor of Toledo	Pedro Álvarez de Toledo, Marquis of Villafranca (Alba de Tormes)	11 January 1522	29 March 1539		17 December 1562		Cosimo I de' Medici

== Grand Duchesses consort of Tuscany ==
=== House of Medici, 1569–1737 ===
Picture	Name	Father	Birth	Marriage	Became Consort	Ceased to be Consort	Death	Spouse
	Joanna of Austria	Ferdinand I, Holy Roman Emperor (Habsburg)	24 January 1547	25 December 1565	21 April 1574 husband's accession	11 April 1578		Francesco I
	Bianca Cappello	Bartolomeo Cappello (Cappello)	1548	12 June 1579		17 October 1587		Francesco I
	Christina of Lorraine	Charles III, Duke of Lorraine (Lorraine)	16 August 1565	3 May 1589		17 February 1609 husband's death	9 December 1637	Ferdinando I
	Maria Magdalena of Austria	Charles II, Archduke of Austria (Habsburg)	7 October 1589	19 October 1608	17 February 1609 husband's accession	28 February 1621 husband's death	1 November 1631	Cosimo II
	Vittoria della Rovere	Federico Ubaldo della Rovere (Della Rovere)	7 February 1622	26 September 1633		23 May 1670 husband's death	5 March 1694	Ferdinando II
	Marguerite Louise d'Orléans	Gaston d'Orléans (Orléans)	28 July 1645	20 June 1661	23 May 1670 husband's accession	17 September 1721		Cosimo III
	Anna Maria Franziska of Saxe-Lauenburg	Julius Francis, Duke of Saxe-Lauenburg (Ascania)	13 June 1672	2 September 1697	31 October 1723 husband's accession	9 July 1737 husband's death	15 October 1741	Gian Gastone

The Medici became extinct in 1737. Francis Stephen, Duke of Lorraine acceded the grand-ducal throne.

=== House of Lorraine, 1737–1765 ===
Picture	Name	Father	Birth	Marriage	Became Consort	Ceased to be Consort	Death	Spouse
	Maria Theresa of Austria	Charles VI, Holy Roman Emperor (Habsburg)	13 May 1717	12 February 1736	9 July 1737 husband's accession	18 August 1765 husband's death	29 November 1780	Francesco II

=== House of Habsburg-Lorraine, 1765–1801 ===
Picture	Name	Father	Birth	Marriage	Became Consort	Ceased to be Consort	Death	Spouse
	Maria Luisa of Spain	Charles III of Spain (Bourbon)	24 November 1745	5 August 1765	18 August 1765 husband's accession	20 February 1790 husband's abdication, becomes Holy Roman Empress	15 May 1792	Leopold I
	Luise of Naples and Sicily	Ferdinand I of the Two Sicilies (Bourbon-Two Sicilies)	27 July 1773	15 August 1790		21 March 1801 husband's deposition	19 December 1802	Ferdinand III

The House of Habsburg-Lorraine was deposed by the Treaty of Aranjuez in 1801.

== Queen consort of Etruria ==
=== House of Bourbon-Parma, 1801–1807 ===
Picture	Name	Father	Birth	Marriage	Became Consort	Ceased to be Consort	Death	Spouse
	Maria Luisa of Spain	Charles IV of Spain (Bourbon)	6 July 1782	25 August 1795	21 March 1801 husband's accession	27 May 1803 husband's death	13 March 1824	Louis

The House of Bourbon-Parma ruled over Tuscany in the form of the Kingdom of Etruria until their own deposition by forces of Napoleon Bonaparte in 1807.

== Grand ducal consorts of Tuscany ==
=== House of Bonaparte, 1809–1814 ===
Elisa Bonaparte became the puppet ruler of Tuscany in 1809 by appointment from her own second older brother and King of Italy, Napoleon himself. She was the Grand Duchess of Tuscany as ruler, not as consort.

Picture	Name	Father	Birth	Marriage	Became Consort	Ceased to be Consort	Death	Spouse
	Felice	Francis Baciocchi (Baciocchi)	18 May 1762	5 May 1797	3 March 1809 wife's accession	1 February 1814 wife's deposition	27 April 1841	Elisa

=== House of Habsburg-Lorraine, 1814–1859 ===
The Habsburgs were restored by the Congress of Vienna in 1814.

Picture	Name	Father	Birth	Marriage	Became Consort	Ceased to be Consort	Death	Spouse
	Princess Maria Ferdinanda of Saxony	Maximilian, Crown Prince of Saxony (Wettin)	27 April 1796	6 May 1821		18 June 1824 husband's death	3 January 1865	Ferdinand III
	Princess Maria Anna of Saxony	Maximilian, Crown Prince of Saxony (Wettin)	15 November 1799	16 November 1817	18 June 1824 husband's accession	24 March 1832		Leopold II
	Princess Maria Antonia of the Two Sicilies	Francis I of the Two Sicilies (Bourbon-Two Sicilies)	19 December 1814	7 June 1833		21 July 1859 husband's abdication/deposition	7 November 1898	Leopold II

Tuscany was annexed to the United Provinces of Central Italy in 1859, and then absorbed into the Kingdom of Sardinia in 1860.

== See also ==
- List of rulers of Tuscany
- List of consorts of Urbino
- List of Parmese consorts
- List of Savoyard consorts
- List of consorts of Montferrat
- List of Sardinian consorts
- List of Sicilian consorts
- List of Neapolitan consorts
- List of consorts of the Two Sicilies
- List of Italian consorts
- Grand Duchy of Tuscany
- Grand Princesses of Tuscany
