= Boniface of Tuscany =

Boniface of Tuscany may refer to:

- Boniface I, Margrave of Tuscany (died 823), governor of Italy under Charlemagne after the death of King Pepin
- Boniface II, Margrave of Tuscany (died c. 838), count and duke of Lucca
- Boniface, Count of Bologna (died c. 1011), Count of Bologna and Margrave of Tuscany
- Boniface III, Margrave of Tuscany (c. 985–1052), father of Matilda of Canossa and the most powerful north Italian prince of his age
