= Ratold =

Ratold, also spelled Rathold, Radolt, Ratolt or Ratoldus, is a masculine given name of Germanic origin. It is a variant of Rapoto. In Italian it is Ratoldo. It may refer to:

- Ratold (bishop of Verona) (c. 770–840/58)
- Ratold (bishop of Strasbourg) (fl. 874)
- Ratold of Italy (fl. 896), king
- Ratold of Aibling (10th century) hermit
- Ratold of Corbie (abbot, 986–1014)

Radolt, as a surname, may refer to:

- Wenzel Ludwig von Radolt (1667–1716), Austrian musician and composer

== See also ==
- Rátót (genus), a Hungarian family
