= Canossa Castle =

Castle in Reggio Emilia, Italy

Coordinates: 44°34′33.6″N 10°27′21.6″E

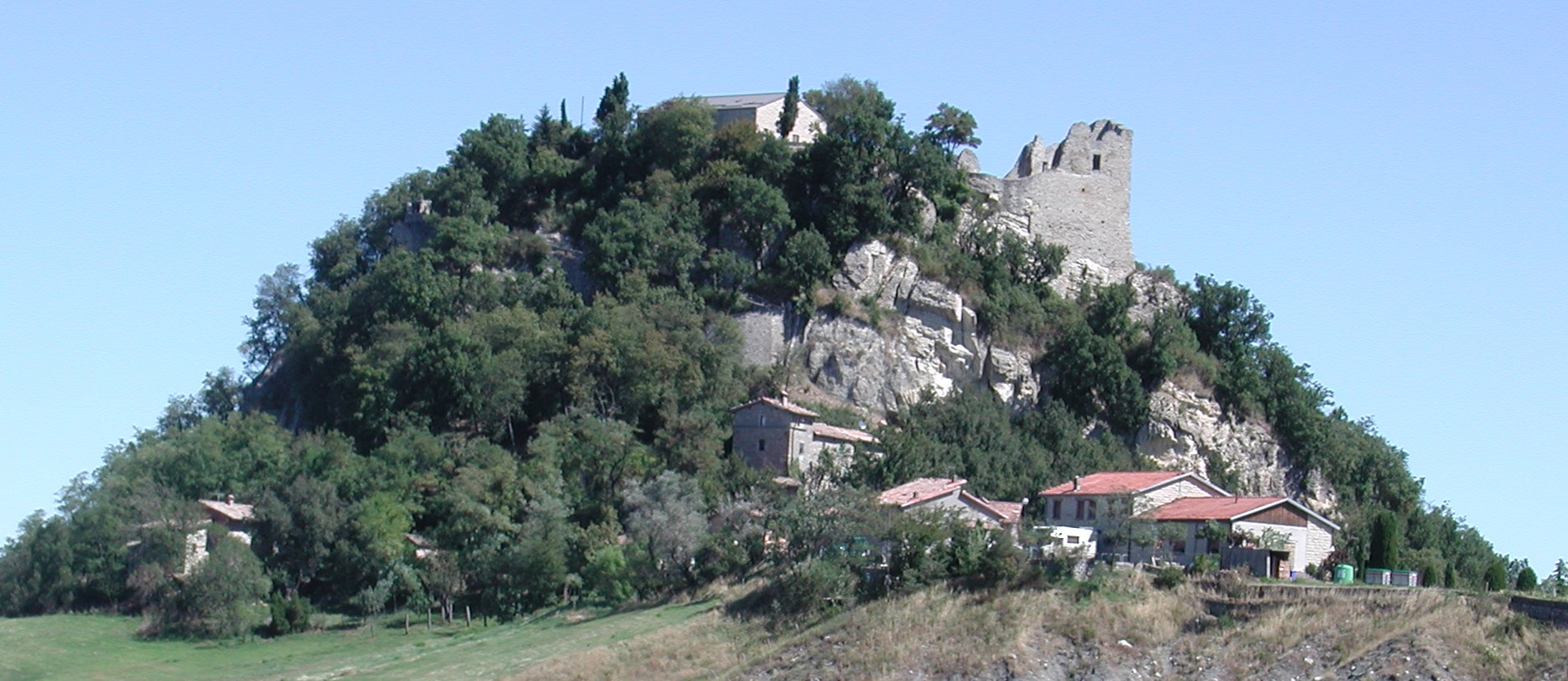
The ruins of the Castle of Canossa

The Castle of Canossa is a castle in Canossa, province of Reggio Emilia, northern Italy, especially known for being the location of the Road to Canossa, the meeting of Emperor Henry IV and Pope Gregory VII during the Investiture Controversy (1077).

== History ==
The castle was built around 940 AD by Adalbert Atto, the Count of Beggia and Mantura, and the son of Sigifredo of Lucca, a Lombard nobleman, on the summit of a rocky hill. In addition to Adalberto's residence, it also housed a convent with 12 Benedictine monks and the church of Sant'Apollonio. It was protected by a triple line of walls; located between the outer two layers of defense were the barracks and the residences of the servants.

During the Middle Ages, it was one of the most formidable castles in Italy. In 950 Adelaide of Italy, the widow of King Lothair II, took refuge there; Berengar II of Ivrea unsuccessfully besieged the castle for three years. During the Investiture Controversy in 1077, the castle formed the venue for the reconciliation between Henry IV and Gregory VII. The latter had friendly relations with the then-owner, Matilda of Tuscany, who established that her lands should be assigned to the Church after her death (1115). Her heirs, however, would have none of it.

In 1255, troops of Reggio destroyed the castle and the church. It was returned to the Canossa family. After the death of Giberto da Correggio in 1321, it was again a possession of Reggio until 1402, when Simone, Guido and Alberto Canossa gained it back; in 1409, however, they ceded it to the House of Este, who (apart from a short period under Ottavio Farnese, Duke of Parma in 1557) held it until 1796.

In 1502 Ercole I d'Este named the poet Ludovico Ariosto as castellan. He resided here for six months. In 1593 Canossa was assigned as fief to the Counts Rondinelli. In 1642 Duke Francesco I entrusted it to the Valentini. The latter were ousted in 1796 by the rebellious local population, who joined the Republic of Reggio.

After being returned to the Valentini, in 1878 the Castle was acquired by the Italian State, and was declared a national monument.

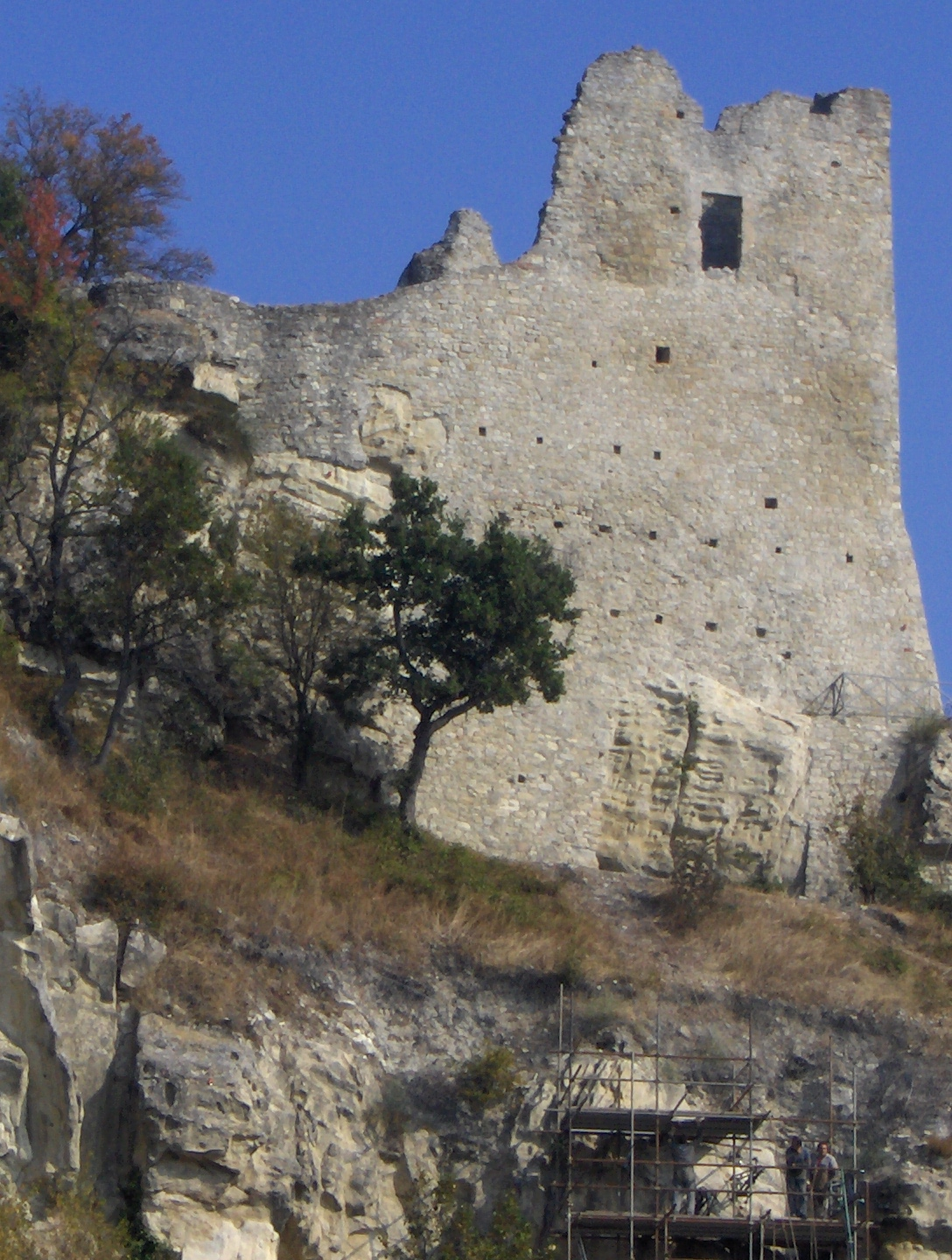
Ruins - Castle of Canossa

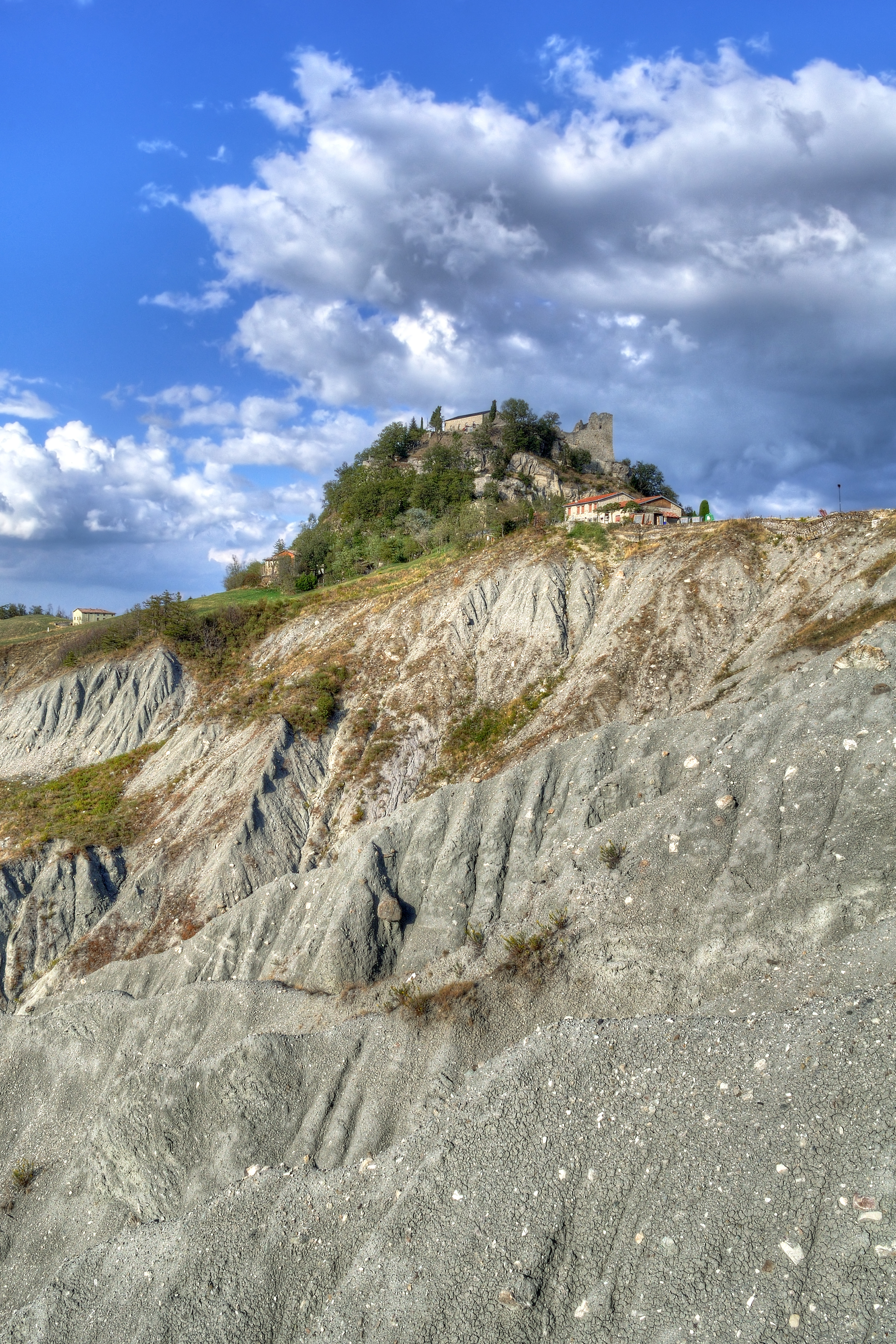
Badlands near Castle of Canossa

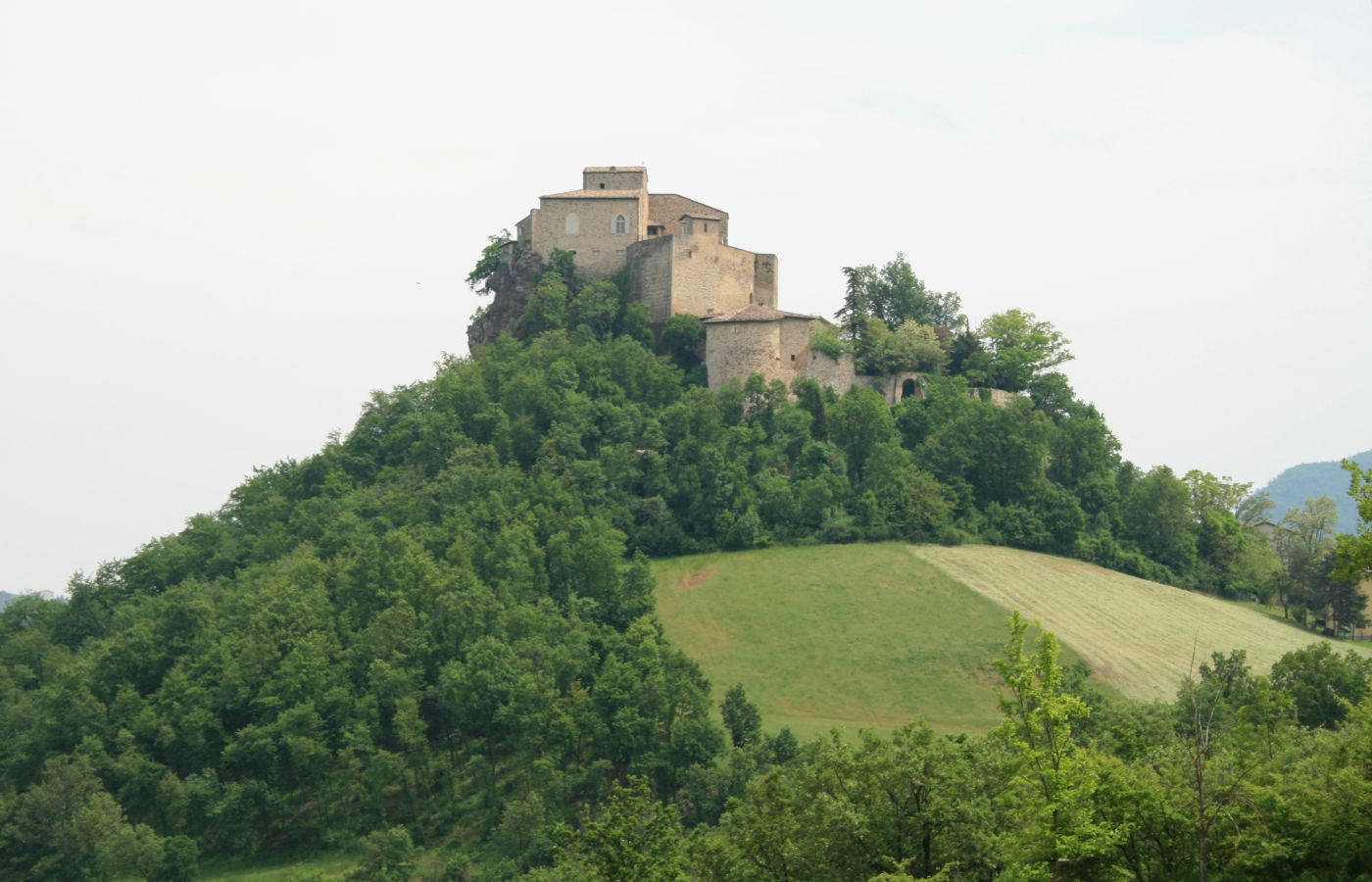
Castle of Rossena near Castle of Canossa
