= Pope Innocent III =

Head of the Catholic Church from 1198 to 1216

- Bishop of Rome
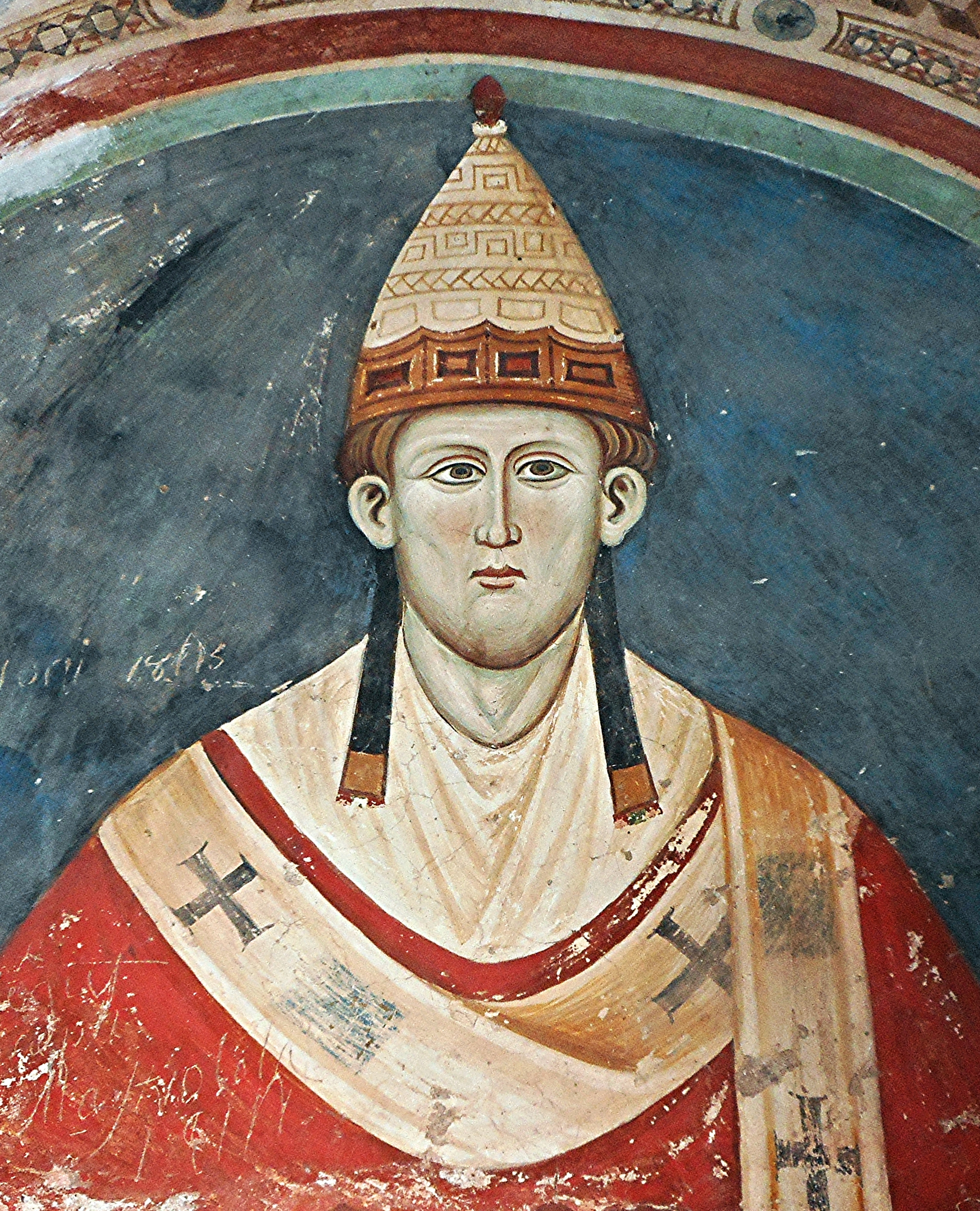
- Detail of a fresco at the cloister Sacro Speco, c. 1219
- Church: Catholic Church
- Papacy began: 8 January 1198
- Papacy ended: 16 July 1216
- Predecessor: Celestine III
- Successor: Honorius III
- Previous posts: Cardinal-Deacon of St. George in Velabro and Sts. Sergius and Bacchus (1190–1191); Cardinal-Priest of St. Pudentiana (1191–1198)

Orders
- Ordination: 21 February 1198
- Consecration: 22 February 1198 by Ottaviano di Paoli
- Created cardinal: September 1190 by Clement III

Personal details
- Born: Lotario de' Conti di Segni; 1160/1161 Gavignano, Papal States
- Died: 16 July 1216 (aged 55) Perugia, Papal States
- Parents: Trasimondo de' Conti di Segni; Clarissa Scotti
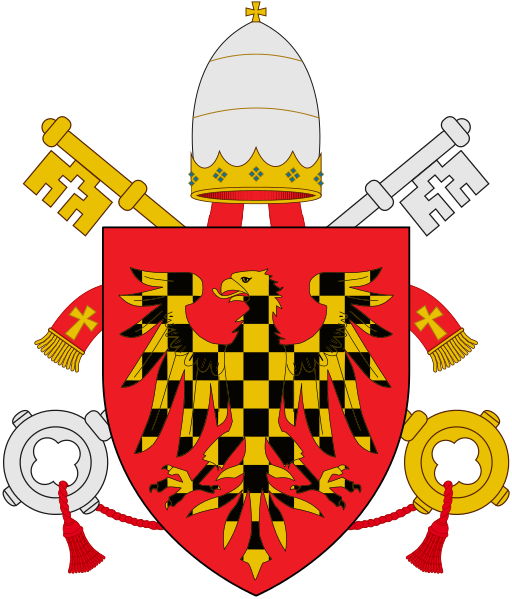
- Coat of arms: Innocent III's coat of arms

Ordination history
History
Episcopal consecration
- Consecrated by: Ottaviano di Paoli
- Date: 22 February 1198
- Place: Rome
Cardinalate
- Elevated by: Pope Clement III
- Date: September 1190
Episcopal succession
Bishops consecrated by Pope Innocent III as principal consecrator
- Raynald of Nocera: March 1198
- Adhémar de Peirat: 7 April 1198
- John of Leighlin: 18 September 1198
- Mauger of Worcester: 4 June 1200
- Albert Longhi: 22 June 1203
- Malachias of Lismore: 5 November 1203
- Tommaso Morsini: 27 March 1205
- Peter des Roches: 25 September 1205
- Albrecht de Kevenburg: 24 December 1206
- Guillaume Amanevi: 1207
- Antelm of Patrae Veteres: 29 April 1207
- Stephen Langton: 17 June 1207
- Gérard de Cros: 1209
- Andrea de Celano: 1214
- Filippo of Troia: October 1214
- Christian to the Prussians: 1215
- Bonfigli of Siena: 10 April 1216
- Silvester of Evesham: 3 July 1216

Pope Innocent III (Latin: Innocentius III; born Lotario de' Conti di Segni; (Note: Anglicized as Lothar of Segni) 1160/1161 – 16 July 1216) was the head of the Catholic Church and sovereign of the Papal States from 8 January 1198 until his death in 1216.

Pope Innocent was one of the most powerful and influential of the medieval popes. He exerted a wide influence over the Christian states of Europe, claiming supremacy over all of Europe's kings. He was central in supporting the Catholic Church's reforms of ecclesiastical affairs through his decretals and the Fourth Lateran Council. This resulted in a considerable refinement of Western canon law. He is furthermore notable for using interdict and other censures to compel princes to obey his decisions, although these measures were not uniformly successful.

Innocent greatly extended the scope of the Crusades, directing crusades against Muslim Iberia and the Holy Land as well as the Livonian Crusade against the Baltic and Finnic pagans of Livonia and the Albigensian Crusade against the Cathars in southern France. He organized the Fourth Crusade of 1202–1204, which ended in the sack of Constantinople. Although the attack on Constantinople went against his explicit orders, and the Crusaders were subsequently excommunicated, Innocent reluctantly accepted this result, seeing it as the will of God to reunite the Latin and Eastern Orthodox Churches. In the event, the sack of Constantinople and the subsequent period of Frankokratia heightened the hostility between the Latin and Greek churches; the Byzantine Empire was restored in 1261, albeit in a much weaker state.

== Biography ==
=== Early life ===
Lotario de' Conti was born 1160/1161 in Gavignano, near Anagni, southeast of Rome. His father, Trasimondo de' Conti di Segni (de comitibus Signiae) belonging to the notables of the city of Segni, was from the Conti family, who eventually produced nine cardinals and four popes, including Gregory IX, Alexander IV, and Innocent XIII. Lotario's mother, Clarissa Scotti (Romani de Scotti), was according to some scholars related to Pope Clement III.

Lotario received his early education in Rome, probably at the Camaldolese Benedictine abbey of Sant'Andrea al Celio under Peter Ismael. He studied theology in Paris under the theologians Peter of Poitiers, Melior of Pisa, and Peter of Corbeil, and (possibly) jurisprudence in Bologna, according to the Gesta (between 1187 and 1189). As pope, Lotario was to play a major role in the shaping of canon law through conciliar canons and decretal letters.

Shortly after the death of Alexander III (30 August 1181), Lotario returned to Rome and held various ecclesiastical offices during the short reigns of Lucius III, Urban III, Gregory VIII, and Clement III, being ordained a Subdeacon by Gregory VIII and reaching the rank of Cardinal-Priest under Clement III in 1191.

As a cardinal, Lotario wrote De Miseria Condicionis Humane "On the Misery of the Human Condition". The work was very popular for centuries, surviving in more than 700 manuscripts. Although he never returned to the complementary work he intended to write, On the Dignity of Human Nature, Bartolomeo Facio (1400–1457) took up the task writing De excellentia ac praestantia hominis.

=== Election to the papacy ===
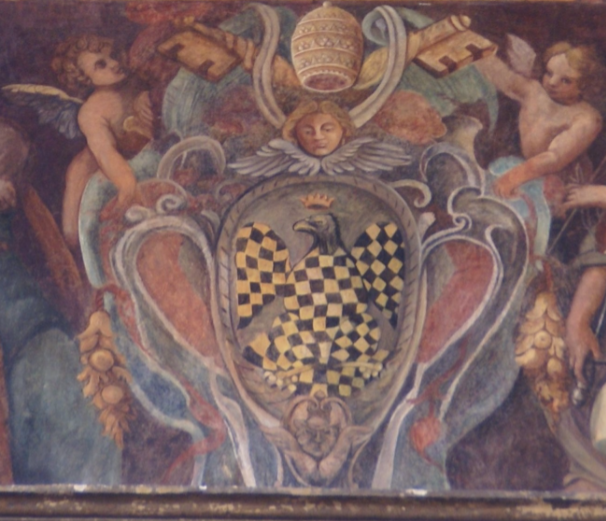
Arms of Innocent III at Santo Spirito in Sassia, Rome

Celestine III died on 8 January 1198. Before his death he had urged the College of Cardinals to elect Giovanni di San Paolo as his successor, but Lotario de' Conti was elected pope in the ruins of the ancient Septizodium, near the Circus Maximus in Rome after only two ballots on the very day on which Celestine III died. He was only thirty-seven years old at the time. He took the name Innocent III, maybe as a reference to his predecessor Innocent II (1130–1143), who had succeeded in asserting the papacy's authority over the emperor (in contrast with Celestine III's recent policy).

=== Reassertion of papal power ===
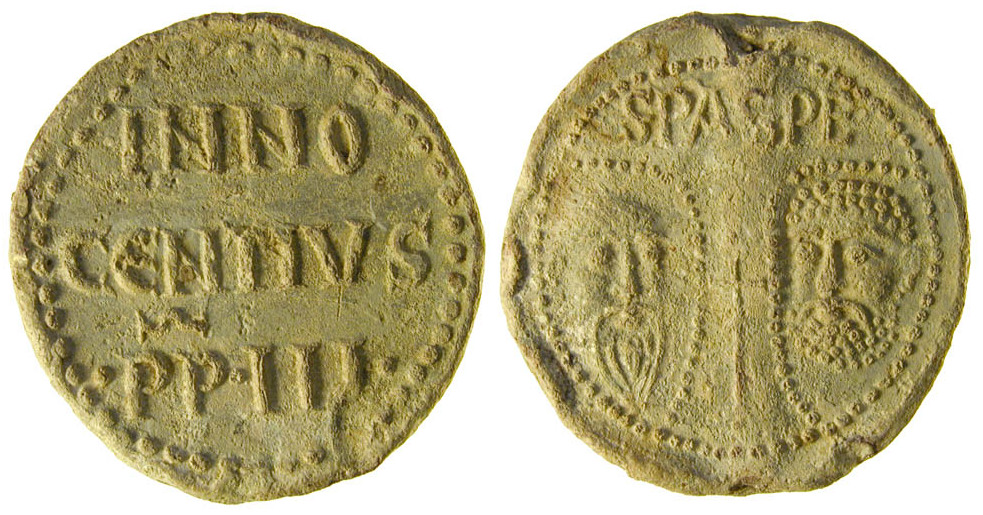
Bulla of Innocent III

As pope, Innocent III began with a very wide sense of his responsibility and his authority. During Innocent III's reign, the papacy was at the height of its powers. He was considered the most powerful person in Europe at the time. In 1198, Innocent wrote to the prefect Acerbius and the nobles of Tuscany expressing his support of the medieval political Sun and Moon allegory. His papacy asserted the absolute spiritual authority of his office, while still respecting the temporal authority of kings.

There was scarcely a country in Europe over which Innocent III did not in some way or other assert the supremacy which he claimed for the papacy. He excommunicated King Alfonso IX of León for marrying a near relative, Berengaria of Castile, contrary to the laws of the Church, and effected their separation in 1204. He received Aragon in vassalage from Peter II and crowned him king at Rome in 1204.

The Muslim recapture of Jerusalem in 1187 was to him a divine judgment on the moral lapses of Christian princes. He was also determined to protect what he called "the liberty of the Church" from inroads by secular princes. This determination meant, among other things, that princes should not be involved in the selection of bishops. It was particularly focused on the Patrimony of Saint Peter, the section of central Italy claimed by the popes and later called the Papal States. The patrimonium was routinely threatened by the Holy Roman Empire of the House of Hohenstaufen, which claimed it. Emperor Henry VI expected his infant son Frederick to bring Germany, Italy, and Sicily under a single ruler, which would leave the Papal States exceedingly vulnerable.

Henry's early death left his three-year-old son Frederick as king of Sicily. Henry VI's widow, Queen Constance I of Sicily, was as eager as Pope Innocent III to remove German power from the kingdom of Sicily, and therefore in her Will named Innocent as the guardian of her young son, Frederick, when she died in 1198. In exchange, Innocent was also able to recover papal rights in Sicily that had been surrendered decades earlier to King William I by Pope Adrian IV. The pope invested the young Frederick as king of Sicily in November 1198. He also later induced Frederick to marry Constance of Aragon, the widow of King Emeric of Hungary, in 1209.

=== Involvement in Imperial elections ===
Innocent was concerned that the marriage of Henry VI and Constance of Sicily gave the Hohenstaufens a claim to all the Italian peninsula except for the Patrimony, which would be surrounded by Imperial territory.

After the death of Emperor Henry VI, who had recently also conquered the Kingdom of Sicily, the succession became disputed: as Henry's son Frederick was still a small child, the partisans of the Staufen dynasty elected Henry's brother, Philip, Duke of Swabia, king in March 1198, whereas the princes opposed to the Staufen dynasty elected Otto, Duke of Brunswick, of the House of Welf. King Philip II of France supported Philip's claim, whereas King Richard I of England supported his nephew Otto.

In 1201, the pope openly espoused the side of Otto IV, whose family had always been opposed to the house of Hohenstaufen.

It is the business of the pope to look after the interests of the Roman empire, since the empire derives its origin and its final authority from the papacy; its origin, because it was originally transferred from Greece by and for the sake of the papacy; ... its final authority, because the emperor is raised to his position by the pope who blesses him, crowns him and invests him with the empire. ... Therefore, since three persons have lately been elected king by different parties, namely the youth [Frederick, son of Henry VI], Philip [of Hohenstaufen, brother of Henry VI], and Otto [of Brunswick, of the Welf family], so also three things must be taken into account in regard to each one, namely: the legality, the suitability and the expediency of his election. ... Far be it from us that we should defer to man rather than to God, or that we should fear the countenance of the powerful. ... On the foregoing grounds, then, we decide that the youth should not at present be given the empire; we utterly reject Philip for his manifest unfitness and we order his usurpation to be resisted by all ... since Otto is not only himself devoted to the church, but comes from devout ancestors on both sides ... therefore we decree that he ought to be accepted and supported as king, and ought to be given the crown of empire, after the rights of the Roman church have been secured.

— Papal Decree on the choice of a German King, 1201

The confusion in the Empire allowed Innocent to drive out the imperial feudal lords installed by Emperor Henry VI from Ancona, Spoleto and Perugia. On 3 July 1201, the papal legate, Cardinal-Bishop Guido of Palestrina, announced in Köln Cathedral that Otto IV had been approved by the pope as Roman king and threatened with excommunication all those who refused to acknowledge him. At the same time, Innocent encouraged the cities in Tuscany to form a league called the League of San Genesio against German imperial interests in Italy, and they placed themselves under Innocent's protection.

In May 1202, Innocent issued the decree Per Venerabilem, addressed to William VIII of Montpellier, explaining his thinking on the relation between the papacy and the Empire. This decree was afterwards embodied in the Corpus Juris Canonici and contained the following items:

- The German princes have the right to elect the king, who is afterwards to become emperor. This right was given by the Apostolic See when it transferred the imperial dignity from the Greeks to the Germans in the person of Charlemagne.
- The right to investigate and decide whether a king thus elected is worthy of the imperial dignity belongs to the pope, whose office it is to anoint, consecrate, and crown him; otherwise it might happen that the pope would be obliged to anoint, consecrate, and crown a king who was excommunicated, a heretic, or a pagan.
- If the pope finds that the king the princes have elected is unworthy of the imperial dignity, the princes must elect a new king or, if they refuse, the pope will confer the imperial dignity upon another king because the Church requires a patron and defender.
- In case of a double election, the pope must exhort the princes to agree. If, after a due interval, they have not reached an agreement, they must ask the pope to arbitrate. If this fails, the pope must decide in favour of one of the claimants. The pope's decision need not be based on the greater legality of either election but the qualifications of the claimants.

Despite papal support, Otto could not oust his rival Philip before the latter was murdered in a private feud. Otto's rule was undisputed, and he reneged on his earlier promises. He set his sights on reestablishing imperial power in Italy, claiming even the Kingdom of Sicily. Given the papal interests in keeping the Holy Roman Empire and Sicily apart, Innocent now supported his ward, King Frederick of Sicily, to resist Otto's advances and restore the Staufen dynasty to the Holy Roman Empire. Frederick was elected by Staufen partisans.

The conflict was decided by the Battle of Bouvines on 27 July 1214, which pitted Otto and John, King of England and the Angevin Empire against Philip II of Capetian France. The French defeated Otto, and he lost all influence. He died on 19 May 1218, leaving Frederick II as undisputed emperor. King John was forced to acknowledge the Pope as his feudal lord and accept Stephen Langton as Archbishop of Canterbury. In his turn, Frederick II would later become a bitter opponent of the papacy once his empire was secure. The victory of the Capetians in this battle permitted the Invasion of Normandy by Philip II of France and ended the Angevin Empire.

=== Federal power over Europe ===
Innocent III played further roles in the politics of Norway, France, Sweden, Bulgaria, Spain and England. At the request of England's King John, Pope Innocent III declared Magna Carta annulled, which resulted in a rebellion by the English barons who rejected the disenfranchisement.

=== Crusades and suppression of heresy ===
==== Fourth Crusade ====
Pope Innocent III spent the majority of his tenure as Pope (1198–1216) preparing for a great crusade on the Holy Land. His first attempt was the Fourth Crusade (1202–1204), which he decreed by the papal bull Post miserabile in 1198. Unlike past popes, Innocent III displayed interest in leading the crusade himself, rather than simply instigating it and allowing secular leaders to organize the expedition according to their aspirations.

Innocent III's first order of business in preaching the crusade was to send missionaries to every Catholic state to endorse the campaign. He sent Peter of Capua the Elder to the kings of France and England with specific instructions to convince them to settle their differences, resulting in a truce of five years between the two nations, beginning in 1199. The intent of the truce was not to allow the two kings to lead the crusade, but rather to free their resources to assist the Crusade. For the army's leadership, Innocent aimed his pleas at the knights and nobles of Europe, succeeding in France, where many lords answered the pope's call, including the army's two eventual leaders, Theobald III of Champagne and Boniface I, Marquess of Montferrat. The pope's calls to action were not received with as much enthusiasm in England or Germany, and the expedition became mainly a French affair.

The Fourth Crusade was an expensive endeavor. Innocent III raised funds with a new approach: requiring all clergy to donate one-fortieth of their income. This marked the first time a pope ever imposed a direct tax on the clergy. He faced many difficulties collecting this tax, including corrupt tax collectors and disregard in England. He also sent envoys to King John of England and King Philip of France, who pledged to contribute to the campaign, and John also declared his support for the clerical tax in his kingdom. The Crusaders also contributed funds: Innocent declared that those who took the crusader's vow but could no longer fulfill it could be released by a contribution of funds. The pope put Archbishop Hubert Walter in charge of collecting these dues.

At the onset of the crusade, the intended destination was Egypt, as the Christians and Muslims were under a truce at the time. An agreement was made between the French Crusaders and the Venetians. The Venetians would supply vessels and supplies for the Crusaders, who would pay 85,000 marks. Innocent approved under two conditions: a representative of the pope must accompany the crusade, and the attack on other Christians was strictly forbidden.

The French failed to raise sufficient funds for the payment of the Venetians. As a result, the Crusaders diverted the crusade to the Christian Dalmatian city of Zadar in 1202 at the will of the Venetian Enrico Dandolo to subsidize the debt. This diversion was adopted without the consent of Innocent III, who threatened excommunication to any who took part. Most French ignored the threat and therefore were excommunicated by Innocent III, but soon were forgiven. A second diversion occurred when the crusaders engaged in the sack of Constantinople, capital of the Byzantine Empire, at the behest of the exiled prince Alexios. This diversion was taken without any knowledge by Innocent III and he did not learn of it until after the city had been plundered and Alexios was crowned as Alexios IV Angelos.

Innocent III was heavily opposed to an attack on Constantinople and sent many letters warning the crusaders. He excommunicated the crusaders who attacked Byzantine cities, but could not stop them. One of the pope's goals had been to persuade Alexios III Angelos, uncle of the exiled prince, to participate in the crusade. Subsequently, Alexios IV was overthrown and Baldwin I was crowned king of the new Latin Empire, which lasted for the next sixty years.

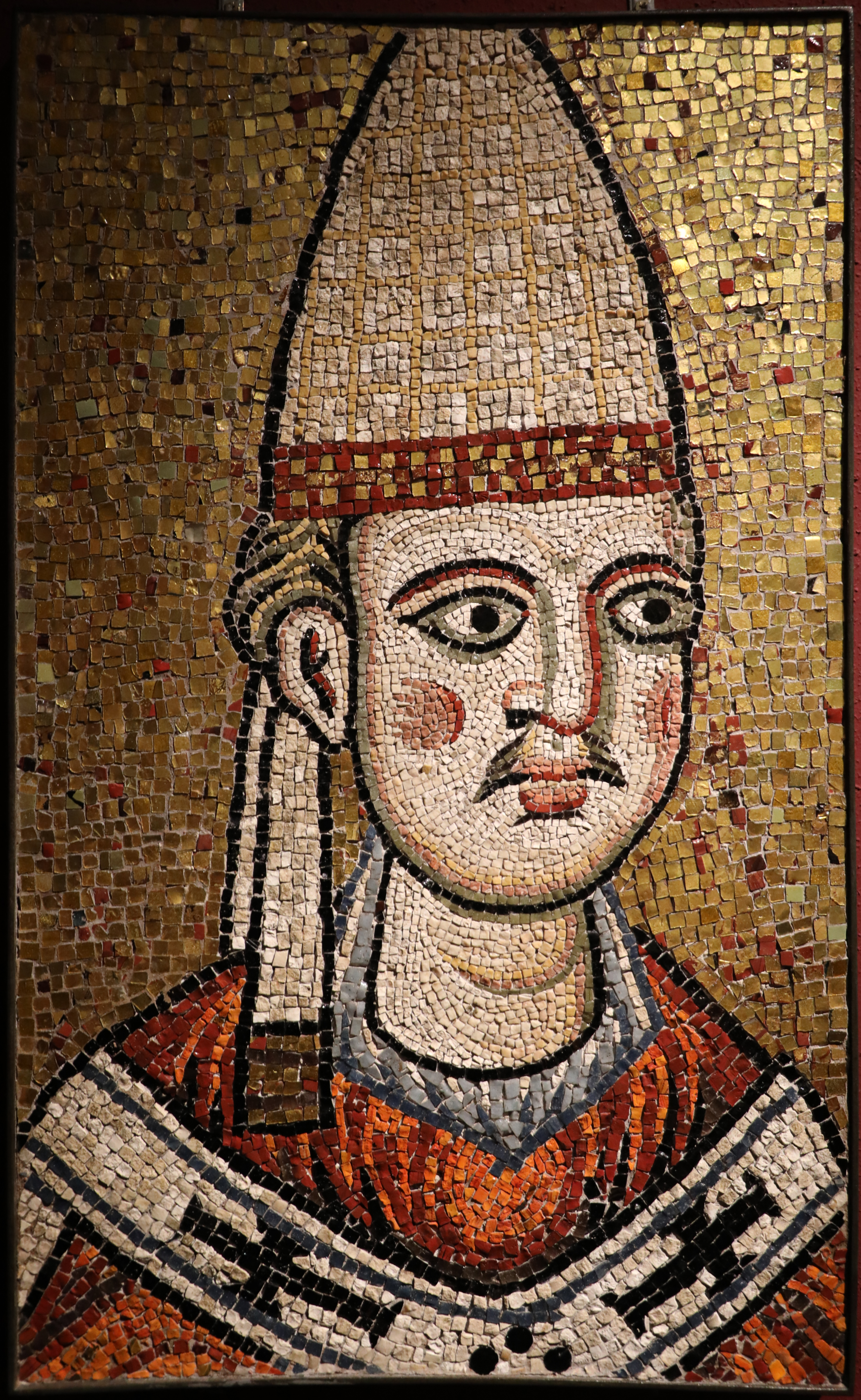
Mosaic of Innocent III, c. 1205–1212

==== Livonian Crusade ====
The 1199 letter of Innocent III provided that Christians who had vowed to go on pilgrimage to the Holy Land would receive an indulgence (or commutation) of penance for sins if they chose to participate in the Livonian Crusade instead, and that they would receive the right to papal protection if they did. Participants would be wearing the insignia of the cross, which came with specific legal obligations; unlike crusaders in the Holy Land, it meant that the wearer had to serve in the papally proclaimed crusade in Livonia for at least one year.

In 1204, he sanctioned the establishment of the military order Livonian Brothers of the Sword.

On 2 February 1207, in the territories conquered, an ecclesiastical state called Terra Mariana was established as a principality of the Holy Roman Empire, and proclaimed by Pope Innocent III in 1215 as a subject of the Holy See.

==== Albigensian Crusade ====
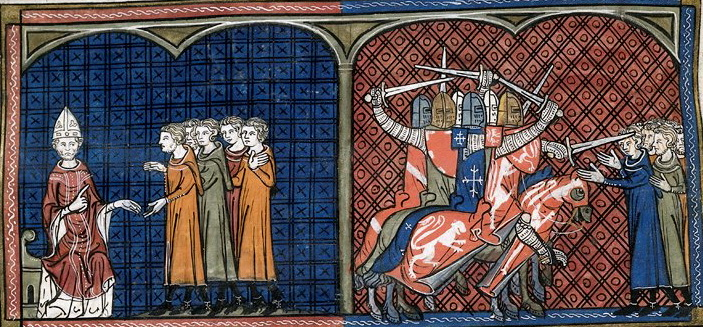
Innocent III launched the Albigensian Crusade against the Cathars.

Pope Innocent III was also a zealous protector of the Catholic faith and a strenuous opponent of heretics. His chief activity was turned against the Albigenses whose expansion he viewed as a mortal threat to Catholicism. They were especially numerous in a few cities of Northern and Southern France. During the first year of his pontificate, Innocent sent the two Cistercian monks Rainer and Guido to the Albigenses in France to preach to them the true doctrines of the Catholic faith and dispute with them on controverted topics of religion. The two Cistercian missionaries were soon followed by Diego, Bishop of Osma, then by Saint Dominic and the two papal legates, Peter of Castelnau and Raoul.

When, however, these missionaries were ridiculed and despised by the Albigenses, and the papal legate Castelnau was assassinated in 1208, Innocent resorted to force. He ordered the bishops of Southern France to put under interdict the participants in the murder and all the towns that gave shelter to them. He was especially incensed against Count Raymond of Toulouse who had previously been excommunicated by the murdered legate and whom the pope suspected as the instigator of the murder. The count protested his innocence and submitted to the pope but the pope placed no further trust in him. He called upon the King of France, Philip II to raise an army for the suppression of the Albigenses. Under the leadership of Simon de Montfort a cruel campaign ensued against the Albigenses which, despite the protest of Innocent, soon turned into a war of conquest. During the siege of Béziers, the leader of the crusader assault famously but dubiously declared upon being asked how to distinguish Cathars from Catholics at the besieged town "Caedite eos. Novit enim Dominus qui sunt eius", which translates as: "Slay them all, God will recognize his own." This statement is often cited as "Kill them all and let God sort them out."

The Albigensian Crusade led to the deaths of approximately 200,000 men, women and children, Cathar and Catholic alike, decimating the number of practising Cathars and diminishing the region's distinct culture. The conflict took on a political flavor, directed not only against the heretics, but also the nobility of Toulouse and vassals of the Crown of Aragon, and finally brought the region firmly under the control of the king of France. King Peter II of Aragon, Count of Barcelona, was directly involved in the conflict, and was killed in the course of the Battle of Muret in 1213. The conflict largely ended with the Treaty of Paris of 1229, in which the integration of the Occitan territory in the French crown was agreed upon.

=== Francis of Assisi ===
In 1209, Francis of Assisi led his first eleven followers to Rome to seek permission from Pope Innocent III to found a new religious order which was ultimately granted. Upon entry to Rome, the brothers encountered Bishop Guido of Assisi, who had in his company Giovanni di San Paolo, the Cardinal-Bishop of Sabina. The cardinal, who was the confessor of Pope Innocent III, was immediately sympathetic to Francis and agreed to represent Francis to the pope. Reluctantly, Pope Innocent agreed to meet with Francis and the brothers the next day. After several days, the pope agreed to admit the group informally, adding that when God increased the group in grace and number, they could return for an official admittance. The group was tonsured. This was important in part because it recognized Church authority and protected his followers from possible accusations of heresy, as had happened to the Waldensians decades earlier. Though Pope Innocent initially had his doubts, following a dream in which he saw Francis holding up the Basilica of St. John Lateran (the cathedral of Rome, thus the 'home church' of all Christendom), he decided to endorse Francis's order. This occurred, according to tradition, on 16 April 1210, and constituted the official founding of the Franciscan Order. The group, then the "Lesser Brothers" (Order of Friars Minor also known as the Franciscan Order), preached on the streets and had no possessions. They were centered in Porziuncola and preached first in Umbria, before expanding throughout Italy.

=== Other religious orders ===
The lesser religious orders which Pope Innocent III approved are the Hospitallers of the Holy Ghost on 23 April 1198, the Trinitarians on 17 December 1198, and the Humiliati, in June 1201.

On 19 June 1204, he reconfirmed the Hospital of the Holy Spirit in Rome and entrusted it to Guy de Montpellier and his companions.

=== Fourth Council of the Lateran ===
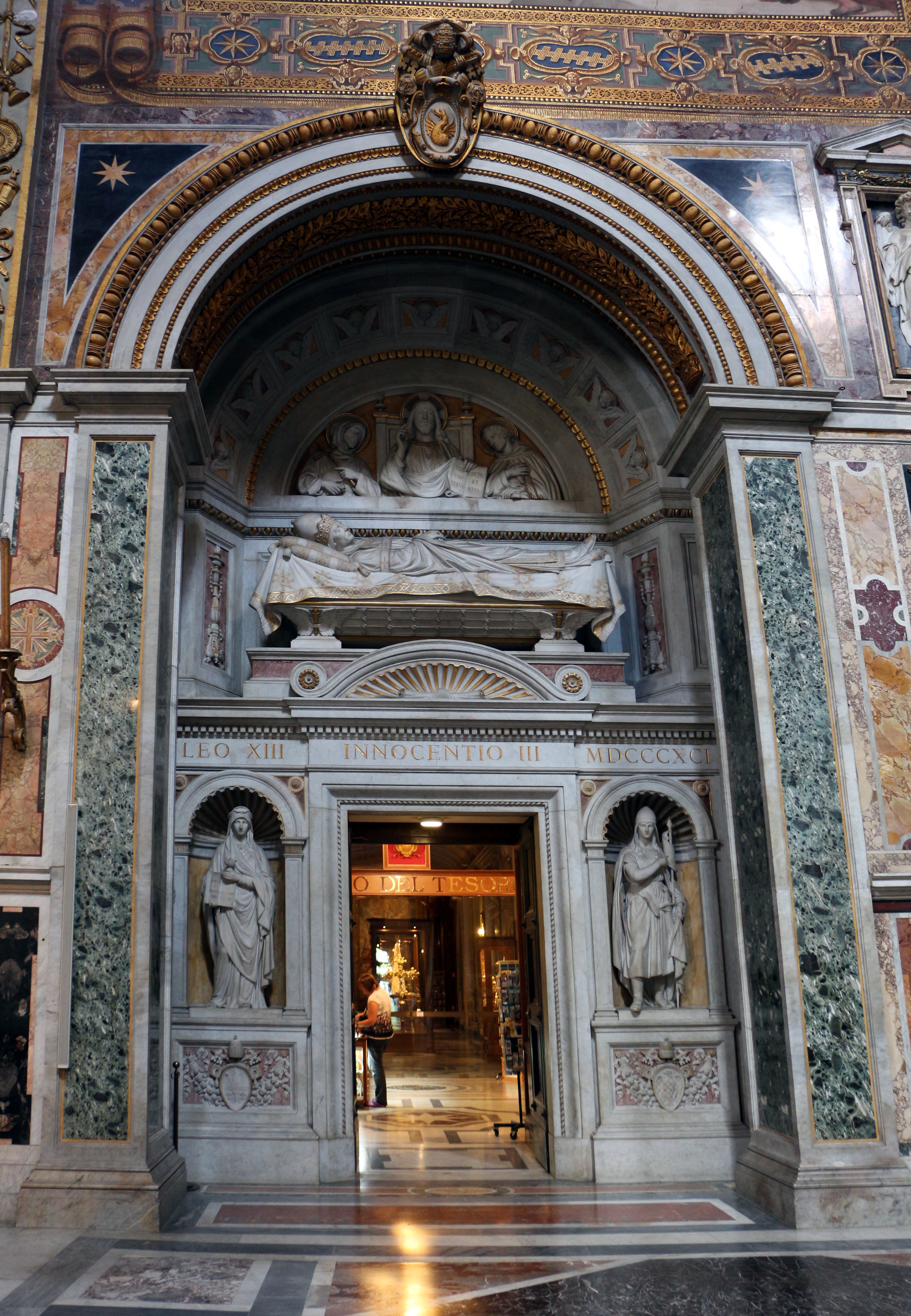
Tomb of Pope Innocent III at Saint John Lateran basilica

On 15 November 1215, Pope Innocent III convened the Fourth Lateran Council which was considered to be the most important Church council of the Middle Ages. By its conclusion, it issued seventy reformatory decrees. Among other things, it encouraged creating schools and holding clergy to a higher standard than the laity. Canon 18 forbade clergymen to participate in the practice of the judicial ordeal, effectively banning its use.

In order to define fundamental doctrines, the council reviewed the nature of the Holy Eucharist, the ordered annual confession of sins, and prescribed detailed procedures for the election of bishops. The council also mandated a strict lifestyle for clergy. Canon 68 states: Jews and Muslims shall wear a special dress to enable them to be distinguished from Christians so that no Christian shall come to marry them ignorant of who they are. Canon 69 forbade "that Jews be given preferment in public office since this offers them the pretext to vent their wrath against the Christians." It assumes that Jews blaspheme Christ, and therefore, as it would be "too absurd for a blasphemer of Christ to exercise power over Christians", Jews should not be appointed to public offices.

=== Death and legacy ===
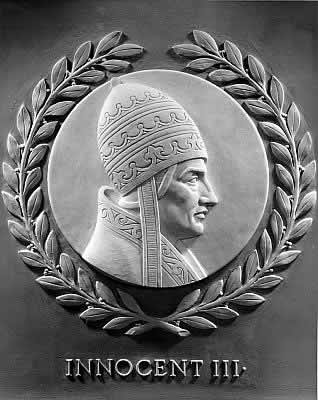
Innocent III honored by the U.S. House of Representatives

The Council had set the beginning of the Fifth Crusade for 1217, under the direct leadership of the Church. After the Council, in the spring of 1216, Innocent moved to northern Italy in an attempt to reconcile the maritime cities of Pisa and Genoa by removing the excommunication cast over Pisa by his predecessor Celestine III and concluding a pact with Genoa.

Innocent III, however, died suddenly at Perugia on 16 July 1216. He was buried in the cathedral of Perugia, where his body remained until Pope Leo XIII had it transferred to the Lateran in December 1891.

Innocent is one of two popes (the other being Gregory IX) among the 23 historical figures depicted in marble relief portraits above the gallery doors of the U.S. House of Representatives in honor of their influence on the development of American law. Polish–American sculptor Joseph Kiselewski created the likeness of Innocent in the House in 1951.

== Works ==
His Latin works include De miseria humanae conditionis, a tract on asceticism that Innocent III wrote before becoming pope, and De sacro altaris mysterio, a description and exegesis of the liturgy. According to Gesta Innocentii III, the works of Innocent were evidence that he surpasses his contemporaries in philosophy and theology.

- De missarum mysteriis, 1195
- De quadripartita specie nuptiarum
- On Heresy: Letter to the Archbishop of Auch, 1198
- On Usury: Letter to the French bishops, 1198
- On Church Independence/Tithes: Letter to a bishop, 1198
- On the crusade and Trade with Saracens: Letter to the Venetians, 1198
- On Jews: Decree of 1199

== See also ==
- List of popes
- Cardinals created by Innocent III

== Sources ==
- (in Italian and Latin) Constitutiones Concilii quarti lateranensis – Costituzioni del quarto Concilio lateranense, ed. by di M. Albertazzi, La Finestra editrice, Lavis 2016.
- Barraclough, Geoffrey (1968). The Medieval Papacy. London: Thames and Hudson.
- Bolton, Brenda, Innocent III. Studies on Papal Authority and Pastoral Care, Variorum, "Collected Studies Series", Aldershot, 1995.
- The Catholic Encyclopedia, Volume VIII. Published 1910. New York: Robert Appleton Company.
- (in Italian) Maccarrone, Michele (ed.), Chiesa e Stato nella dottrina di papa Innocenzo III, Roma: Ateneo lateranense, 1941.
- (in Italian) Maccarone, Michele, Studi su Innocenzo III, Padoue, 1972.
- (in Italian) Maccarone, Michele, Nuovi studi su Innocenzo III, éd. Roberto Lambertini, Rome, Istituto storico italiano per il Medio Evo, 1995.
- (in German) Maleczek, Werner, Papst und Kardinalskolleg von 1191 bis 1216, Wien, 1984.
- Moore, John C. "Pope Innocent III, Sardinia, and the Papal State." Speculum, Vol. 62, No. 1. (Jan. 1987), pp. 81–101. doi:10.2307/2852567. JSTOR 2852567.
- Moore, John C. (2003). Pope Innocent III (1160/61–1216): To Root Up and to Plant. Brill.
- Powell, James M., Innocent III: Vicar of Christ or Lord of the World? 2nd ed.(Washington: Catholic University of American Press, 1994).
- Sayers, Janet E. Innocent III: Leader of Europe 1198–1216, London, New York, Longman (The Medieval World), 1994.
- Smith, Damian J. (2017) [2004]. Innocent III and the Crown of Aragon: The Limits of Papal Authority. New York: Taylor & Francis. ISBN 978-1-351-92743-7.
- (in Italian, French, and German) Andrea Sommerlechner, Andrea (dir.), Innocenzo III. Urbs et Orbis, Rome, Istituto storico italiano per il Medio Evo, 2003, 2 vol.
- Tillman, Helen, Pope Innocent III, New York, 1980.
- (in French) Théry-Astruc, Julien, "Introduction", in Innocent III et le Midi (Cahiers de Fanjeaux, 50), Toulouse, Privat, 2015, pp. 11–35.
- Williams, George L. (1998). Papal Genealogy: The Families and Descendants of the Popes. McFarland & Company Inc.

Catholic Church titles
Preceded by Celestine III	Pope; 1198–1216	Succeeded by Honorius III
