= Boniface II (disambiguation) =

Boniface II might refer to:

- Pope Boniface II (died 532)
- Boniface II, Margrave of Tuscany (died c. 838)
- Boniface II of Montferrat (died 1253)
