= Conrad of Tuscany =

Conrad (German: Konrad, Italian: Corrado) was the margrave of Tuscany from 1119/20 until 1129/31. He was a German (Teutonicus in contemporary records), appointed by the Emperor Henry V to bring Tuscany back under imperial control. During the long Investiture Controversy, the Tuscan countess Matilda of Canossa had taken the ecclesiastical side against the emperor and imperial influence in the Tuscan margraviate was at low ebb upon her death in 1115. Conrad was the second in a series of 12th-century German appointees who proved too weak to restore imperial control and whose tenures are associated with the rise of self-government in the Tuscan cities—Florence, Genoa, Lucca, Pisa and Siena.

== Origins ==
His family and his place of birth are unidentified, although two conflicting lines of evidence both point to Bavaria. While in Tuscany, he donated land to the Bavarian abbey of Saints Ulrich and Afra. The land in question suggests he might have been a relative of the counts of Scheyern (or Scheiern). On the other hand, a note was added to the back of a diploma of King Conrad III confirming the donation to Ulrich and Afra, and which seems indicated that the margrave was a ministerialis originally from a village named Weilach, near Schrobenhausen. Conrad's obscurity has been likened to that of Werner, also appointed by Emperor Henry V to important positions in Italy.

Henry appointed Conrad margrave after the death of Margrave Rabodo in battle against Florence in 1119. Like his predecessor, Conrad did not enjoy the loyalty of the Tuscans—who perceived him as a foreigner—and the resources to sustain imperial power in the margraviate. Given their obscure backgrounds, probably neither Rabodo nor Conrad were equipped with the administrative experience or the local knowledge required for ruling such a rich and populous province as Tuscany. Prior to 1115, Tuscany was ruled by the House of Canossa with extensive allodial properties to support it.

== Rule in Tuscany ==
There is no record of exactly when Conrad was appointed margrave. It must have been after the death of his predecessor in 1119 and before the first document naming him as ruling in Tuscany in 1120. He arrived in Tuscany with a small attachment of Germans, but he soon managed to raise an army and make a tour of his margraviate "dispensing justice" (pro iustitia facienda). At the time, the settlement of the extensive Cadolingi inheritance had not yet been resolved. Count Hugh, last of the Cadolingi, had died five years earlier in 1113. By his will he divided his extensive possessions, which spanned all the counties of Tuscany, with part going to his creditors and the other part to his widow, Cecilia, provided that she did not remarry. She did remarry and her four sons by Hugh disputed the inheritance with her second husband. The Tuscan communes and Bishop Benedict I of Lucca also claimed portions. Conrad was dragged into a conflict with the latter over lands he claimed were imperial fiefs and which the bishop claimed should belong to the diocese.

The Tuscan cities had taken advantage of the Investiture Controversy to increase their autonomy. Lucca and Pisa were identified strongly with the imperial cause, while Florence was identified with that of the church. The cities were also developing strong rivalries. Coastal Pisa and Genoa competed for trading monopolies, and Florence and Siena were traditional rivals in central Tuscany. In this situation, Conrad generally favoured Lucca above the rest and spent the years 1120–22 in wars with Florence. In 1120, Conrad granted a privilege to Lucca at the expense of Pisa. In this privilege, consuls appear for the first time representing the city of Lucca. The formal recognition Conrad gave to the consuls—the title itself only appears in Lucchese records for the first time the previous year (1119)—placed the communal government that the city had been building up since the 1080s on a more solid foundation.

The local aristocracy likewise aligned with the cities and for or against the empire. Conrad gave his support to the Guidi counts, allies of Lucca, against the Alberti counts, allies of Florence. In October 1120, with the help of the leading Guidi count, Guido Guerra II, and the commune of Lucca, Conrad besieged the castle of Pontormo, which was being claimed as a fief by the Alberti. With Conrad's support, the Guidi also built a fortified town bordering Alberti lands by compelling the residents of the territory around the pieve (baptismal church) of Sant'Andrea in Empoli to move nearer the church and to construct a wall and towers there for their defence. In April 1121, Conrad was encamped around Passignano in the Val di Pesa, probably engaged in military action against the Alberti. He did not by this show of force secure any influence in Florence.

With the resolution of the Investiture Controversy by the Concordat of Worms (23 September 1122), the Florentine commune and the Alberti seem finally to have accepted Conrad's authority. In October 1122, Conrad presided over a placitum, a large assembly for hearing cases and dispensing justice, outside Florence. This is possibly the last placitum held by a Tuscan margrave. On 24 October, a provost and canon of the Florentine church appeared before the tribunal. The priests charged one Bonifacio di Tegrimo with having unlawfully occupied a parcel of land. Conrad found in their favour. Since this occurred within the limits of the Florentine contado (county) and during the episcopate of the Alberti bishop Goffredo, it is likely that the Florentines had made their peace with the margrave after more than three years of warfare with Conrad and his predecessor.

This apparent détente does not seem to have affected the Guidi, who nevertheless remained on good terms with Conrad. By 1123 certain cattani (captains) loyal to the Guidi had occupied the rocca (hilltop castle) of Fiesole overlooking Florence. While Count Guido and Conrad were absent from Tuscany (1123/4), the Florentines attacked Fiesole and besieged it. The siege dragged on for three years before the Fiesolans were starved into submission and their Etruscan walls razed to the ground (1125/6). Guido died in 1124, probably before ever returning to Tuscany. Conrad apparently made no move to defend Fiesole.

In the late 1120s, Conrad supported Genoa in its war with Pisa, and he tried to cultivate an alliance with Florence in order to draw them away from their support for Pisa. It is in this context that, in 1127, he granted Bishop Goffredo the right to be provided lodging (albergaria) in the parish (plebatus) comprising Campoli, Decimo and Bossolo. Conrad also took the side of Lucca in the city's economic war with Pisa, and in 1128 he sided with the Siena against Pisa, and assisted the Sienese to capture the castle of Bolgheri from the Pisan noble family of the Gherardeschi.

The last record of Conrad's rule dates to 1129, but there is no record of his death nor of a successor in Tuscany prior to 1131. In that year the margrave of Tuscany was one Rampret (Rempotto). Conrad issued more private diplomas than any other 12th-century margrave of Tuscany. In later sources he is sometimes confused with King Conrad II of Italy (died 1101).

== Imperial agent in Italy ==
As a loyal German and high-ranking imperial official in Italy, Conrad several times acted outside of Tuscany on behalf of the emperor. After the canonically-elected Pope Callistus II established himself in Rome in 1120, Conrad was urged to go to the aid of the Antipope Gregory VIII, who had the backing of the emperor. In 1121, he and his nephew Frederick went to Sutri to protect the antipope, who had fled Rome, and was being besieged by Callistus. There they were joined by Werner, margrave of Ancona, but were unable to prevent Gregory from being captured by papal forces on 22 April and imprisoned in the monastery of La Cava.

In 1124, Conrad was absent from Tuscany while he intervened in the Romagna on behalf of Count Guido, who was at war with the counts of Cuneo. There is evidence from a charter of 31 March 1121 and another of 4 September 1129, that Conrad perhaps exercised some public authority in the Romagna. In these charters he claimed to be "[by divine right] duke of Ravenna and chief and margrave of Tuscany" ([Conradus divina gratia] Ravennatum dux et Tusci[a]e preses et [ac] marchio). This may indicate that his authority was extended at some point into the former exarchate of Ravenna, but other than a pair of charters and the brief war with Cuneo (in which Guido Guerra was killed), there is no other record of Conrad as "duke of Ravenna".

Henry V died in 1125 and, since left no son, the succession was disputed. It is unknown whether Conrad backed either of the main candidates, Lothair of Supplinburg or Conrad of Hohenstaufen. The latter is known to have tried to gain support in Italy after Lothair's election in 1127, but there is no indication that the margrave of Tuscany supported him.

== Sources ==
- Baaken, Gerhard (1983). "Corrado, marchese di Toscana". Dizionario Biografico degli Italiani. Vol. 29. Rome: Istituto dell'Enciclopedia Italiana. pp. 387–89.
- Dameron, George Williamson (1991). Episcopal Power and Florentine Society, 1000–1320. Cambridge, MA: Harvard University Press. ISBN 978-0-674-25891-4. OCLC 1193406362.
- Heywood, William (2010) [1921]. A History of Pisa: Eleventh and Twelfth Centuries. Cambridge: Cambridge University Press.
- Savigni, Raffaele (1996). Episcopato e società cittadina a Lucca: da Anselmo II (+1086) a Roberto (+1255). Lucca: San Marco.
- Stephens, W. R. W. (1908). Hildebrand and His Times. London: Longmans, Green and Co.
- Villari, Pasquale (1894). The Two First Centuries of Florentine History: The Republic and Parties at the Time of Dante. London: T. Fisher Unwin.
- Wickham, Christopher (1998). Community and Clientele in Twelfth-century Tuscany: The Origins of the Rural Commune in the Plain of Lucca. Oxford: Clarendon Press.
- Wickham, Christopher (2003). Courts and Conflict in Twelfth-century Tuscany. Oxford: Oxford University Press.
