= Tuscan League =

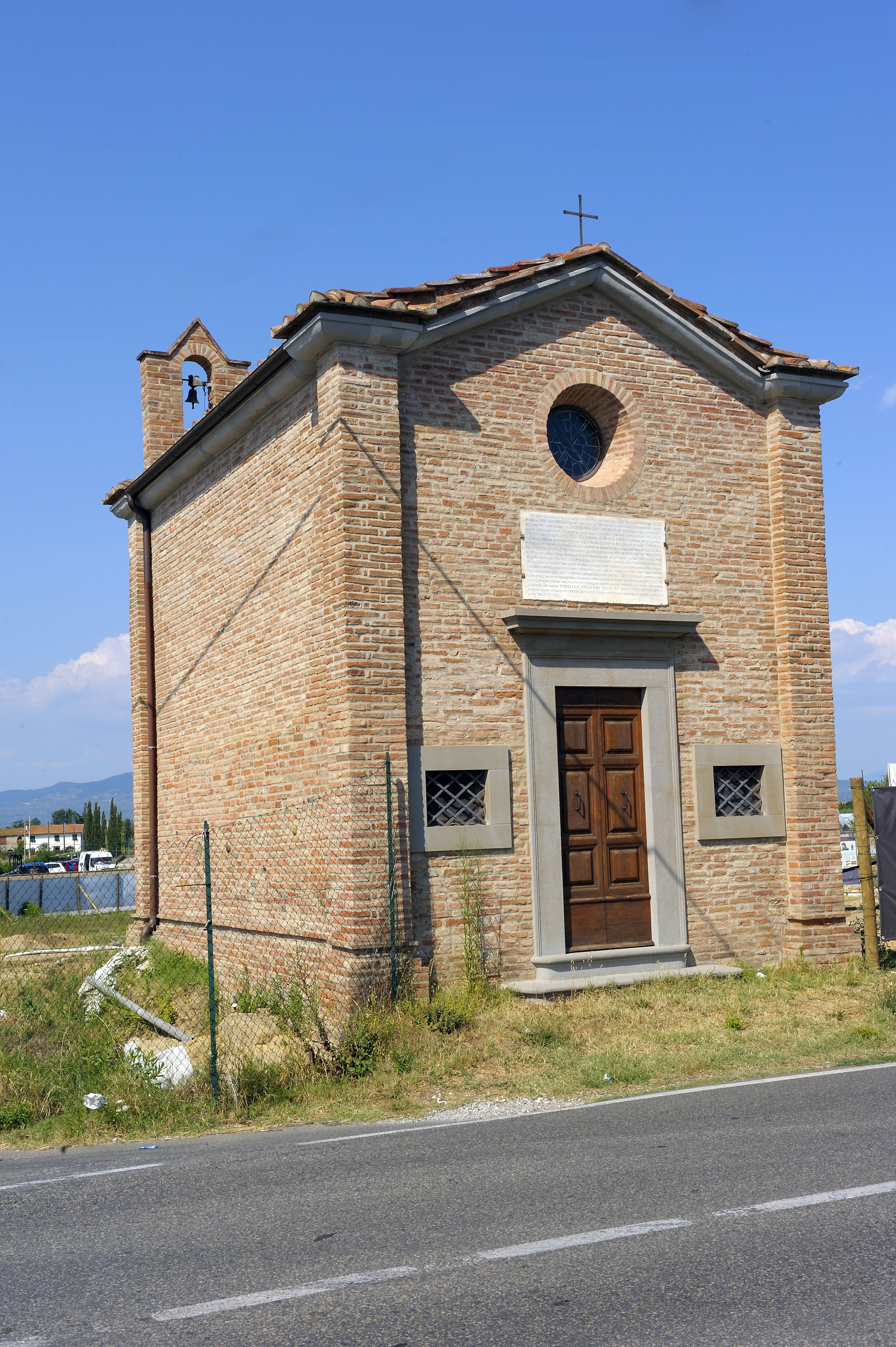
Chapel of San Genesio, inside of the archaeological area of the ancient Borgo San Genesio, seat of the founding oath of the Tuscan League

The Tuscan League, also known as the League of San Genesio, was formed on 11 November 1197 at Borgo San Genesio by the chief cities, barons and bishops of the March of Tuscany shortly after the death of Henry VI, Holy Roman Emperor on 27 September 1197.

== History ==
The league was the work of Pope Celestine III and his two papal legates: Pandulf, cardinal priest of Santi Apostoli, and Bernard, cardinal priest of San Pietro in Vincoli. It was directed against the Holy Roman Emperor in alliance with the papacy. Its members swore not to make any alliances without papal approval, nor to make any peace or truce "with any emperor, king, prince, duke or margrave" without the approval of the rectors of the league. The original signatories were the communes of Lucca, Florence and Siena, the people living under the castles of Prato and San Miniato, and the bishopric of Volterra. The city of Arezzo joined on 2 December; Pisa refused and was placed under interdict by Celestine.

The real objective of the league was to secure for its members control of their respective regions. War was to be made on any city, town, count or bishop who refused to join the league when asked to do so, yet none were allowed to join without recognising their "legitimate" overlords, which in practice usually meant recognising one of the communes as lord. An exception was made for Poggibonsi, since there were many claims on it.

Shortly after the election of 1198, the new pope, Innocent III, condemned the Tuscan League as a dishonorable interference in the affairs of Tuscany, which he now claimed—on the basis of the Liber censuum (1192)—belonged entirely to the temporal jurisdiction of the Roman church. Celestine had not openly claimed authority in imperial or ducal Tuscany, but Innocent was prepared to extend papal claims to cover all of Tuscany. (The Tuscan duchy corresponded to old "Lombard" Tuscany, while papal Tuscany was "Roman", or suburbicarian, Tuscany—a distinction going back to the eighth century.) He thus revoked the interdict on Pisa and persuaded Viterbo and Perugia not to join. He sent Pandulf and Bernard back to try to negotiate the submission of the Tuscan cities and barons to him. Seven months of negotiations failed and Innocent was forced to accept the Tuscan League, even threatening Pisa with a renewed interdict.

== Sources ==
- Robinson, I. S. (1990). The Papacy, 1073–1198: Continuity and Innovation. Cambridge University Press.
- Moore, John C. (2003). Pope Innocent III, 1160/61–1216: To Root Up and to Plant. Brill.
- Moore, John C. (1994) [1963]. "Sardinia and the Papal State". In Powell, James M. (ed.). Innocent III: Vicar of Christ or Lord of the World? (2nd ed.). Catholic University of America Press. pp. 157–72.
- Noble, Thomas F. X. (1984). The Republic of St Peter: The Birth of the Papal State, 680–825. University of Pennsylvania Press.
- Villari, Pasquale (1894). The Two First Centuries of Florentine History: The Republic and Parties at the Time of Dante. T. Fisher Unwin.
