= Richelida =

Richelida or Richilda (died between 1034 and 1037) was a member of the dynasty known to historians as the Giselbertiners (or Giselbertini). Her second husband was Boniface III of Tuscany.

== Life ==
Richilda was the daughter of Giselbert II of Bergamo and Anselda (daughter of Arduin Glaber). Her father was a count palatine in Bergamo and imperial vicar first in Reggio nell'Emilia (1021) and then Verona.

=== First marriage ===
The name of her first husband is not known, but he was probably one of the sons or grandsons of Gandulf I, count of Verona. This unknown husband had died by 1010.

=== Second marriage ===
Between 1010 and 1015 Richilda married her second husband, Boniface of Tuscany. According to Donizo, who was the biographer of Matilda of Canossa (Boniface's daughter by his second wife, Beatrice of Bar), Richilda died without children. By contrast, the anonymous author of the Vita di S. Simeoni eremita (written after 1016 and before 1024) states that Richilda had a daughter who predeceased her. It is not clear if this daughter was Richilda's child by Boniface, or by her first husband.

=== Patronage ===
Richilda was an incredibly wealthy woman. She possessed goods extensive dower goods from her first marriage and received a large grant of land in the county of Ferrara from Emperor Henry II in 1016. According to Donizo, Richilda was a great benefactor of the poor. She also made several donations of property in her own name to religious institutions. In 1017, she made grants of land to the abbey of Nonantula with her husband, Boniface. Though he at that time was styling himself marchio (margrave), in these documents she bore only the title comitissa (countess). The first document bears a signum manus pro Richilde Comitissa.

== Death ==
Richilda died sometime after 1034, but before Boniface married his second wife Beatrice (c.1037). Richilda was buried in Nogara, in a church she had endowed well.
