= Frederick of Tuscany =

Boniface IV Frederick (died July 1055) was the only son of Boniface III of Tuscany and Beatrice of Bar. He was young when his father died on 6 May 1052 and he inherited the great north Italian margraviate.

His mother served as his regent until 1054, when she married Godfrey, former duke of Lower Lorraine. Godfrey was a traitor to Henry III, Holy Roman Emperor, and thus the marriage was considered traitorous. In 1055, Henry held a court at Florence and arrested Beatrice, while Godfrey was rebelling in Lorraine. Henry bade Frederick come, but the child refused. It was no matter, for he died a few days thence and the margraviate passed to his sister Matilda.

== Sources ==
- Bonifaz II. Markgraf von Canossa-Tuszien (1052–1055).

Preceded by Boniface III	Margrave of Tuscany; 1052–1055	Succeeded by Matilda of Tuscany and Godfrey I
