= Frederick II of Upper Lorraine =

Duke of Upper Lorraine from 1019 to 1026

Frederick II, Duke of Upper Lorraine
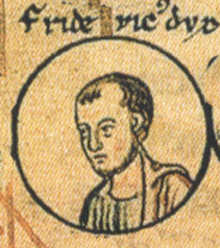
- Spouse: Matilda of Swabia
- Issue: Sophie; Frederick III, Duke of Upper Lorraine; Beatrice
- House: House of Ardennes
- Father: Theodoric I, Duke of Upper Lorraine
- Mother: Richilde of Bliesgau

Frederick II (c. 995–1026), son of Thierry I of the House of Ardennes and Richilde von Blieskastel, daughter of Folmar III, Count in Bliesgau, was the Count of Bar and Duke of Lorraine, co-reigning with his father from 1019.

On the Emperor Henry II's death in 1024, he joined Ernest II, Duke of Swabia, in revolt against the new king, Conrad II. Soon they made peace and recognised the new king. Frederick died in 1026.

Frederick married Matilda of Swabia, daughter of Herman II, Duke of Swabia, and sister-in-law of Conrad. Frederick and Matilda had:

- Sophia, Countess of Bar and Pont-à-Mousson, married Louis, count of Montbéliard
- Frederick
- Beatrice, married firstly Boniface, Margrave of Tuscany, and secondly Godfrey III, Duke of Lower Lotharingia; mother of Matilda of Canossa

== Sources ==
- Eads, Valerie (2003). "The Geography of Power:Matilda of Tuscany and the Strategy of Active Defense". In Kagay, Donald Joseph; Villalon, L. J. Andrew (eds.). Crusaders, Condottieri, and Cannon: Medieval Warfare in Societies Around the Mediterranean. Brill.
- Le Jan, Régine (2003). Famille et pouvoir dans le monde franc (VIIe-Xe siècle), Essai d’anthropologie sociale (in French). Éditions de la Sorbonne.
- Mickel, Emanuel J. (1994). "The Three Godfreys and the Old French Crusade Cycle". In Wright, Monica L.; Lacy, Norris J.; Pickens, Rupert T. (eds.). "Moult a sans et vallour": Studies in Medieval French Literature in Honor of William W. Kibler. Rodopi. pp. 273–288.
- Morby, John (1989). Dynasties of the World. Oxford University Press.
- Whitney, J.P. (1968). "The Reform of the Church". In Tanner, J.R.; Previte-Orton, C.W.; Brooke, Z.N. (eds.). The Cambridge Medieval History. Vol. V. Cambridge University Press.

Preceded by Thierry I	Duke of Upper Lorraine; 1019–1026	Succeeded by Gothelo I, Duke of Lorraine
