= Tedald of Canossa =

Italian count and margrave (died 1012)

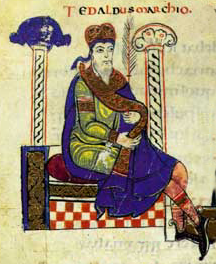
- Tedald as depicted in the early 12th-century Vita Mathildis
- Predecessor: Adalbert Atto
- Successor: Boniface III
- Died: 1012
- Spouse: Willa (daughter of Hubert of Spoleto)
- Issue: Boniface III, Margrave of Tuscany; Tedald, Bishop of Arezzo
- House: House of Canossa
- Father: Adalbert Atto
- Mother: Hildegard (of the Supponid family)

Tedald (died 1012), of the House of Canossa, was the count of Brescia from 980, Modena, Ferrara, and Reggio from 981, and Mantua from 1006. He used the title of margrave because of his vast comital holdings and their frontier nature. His family's seat was Canossa and he was the son of Adalbert Azzo of Canossa who had supported Otto I against Berengar of Ivrea and Adalbert of Ivrea. His rise was largely due to his loyalty to the Ottonian Dynasty.

He opposed his fellow Margrave Arduin of Ivrea in his bid for the Italian crown in 1002. He accompanied the Emperor Henry II on his campaign to Italy in 1004 and was present at Henry's royal coronation in Pavia on May 15. He received Ferrara from the pope. He ensured that his entire patrimony passed to his son Boniface. His second son, Tedald, became Bishop of Arezzo in 1023 and sponsored Guido of Arezzo.

Tedald married Willa daughter of Hubert of Spoleto, natural son of Hugh of Italy.

== Sources ==
- Gwatkin, H.M., Whitney, J.P. (ed) et al. The Cambridge Medieval History: Volume III. Cambridge University Press, 1926.
