= March of Tuscany =

Part of the medieval Kingdom of Italy

Coordinates: 43.85°N 10.5166°E

March of Tuscany Marchiae Tusciae (Latin)
- 846–1197
- Coat of arms of the House of Canossa

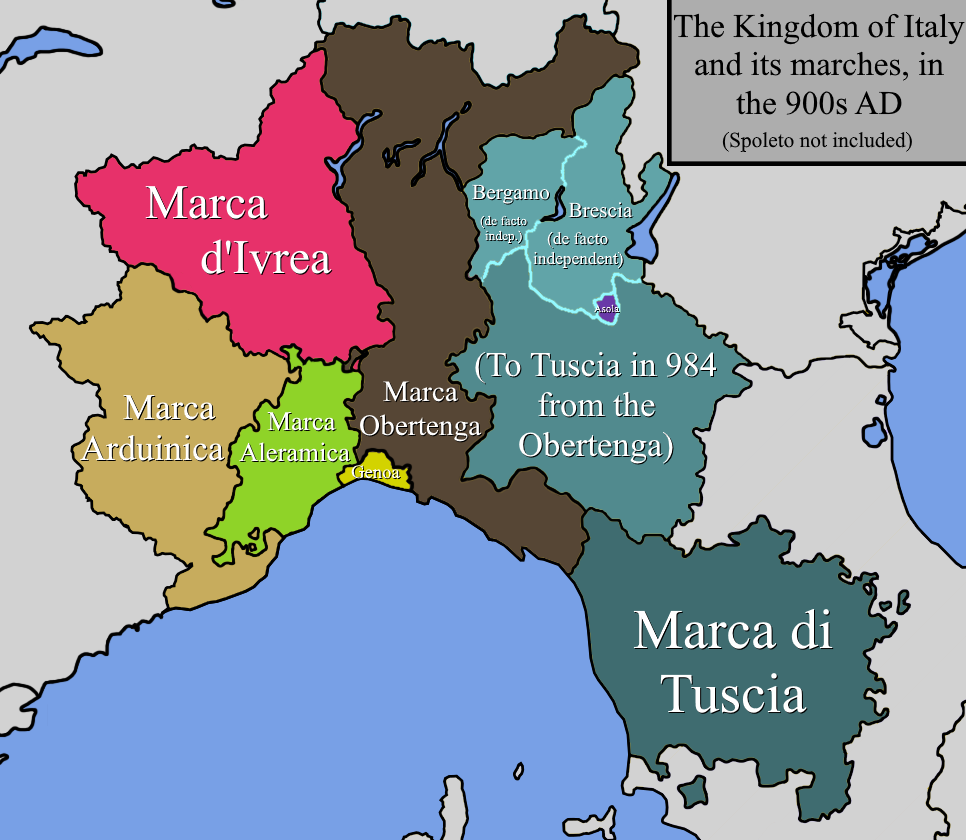
- The March of Tuscany in the political context of Italy in the 900s AD
- Status: March of the Kingdom of Italy
- Capital: Lucca (to 1057); Florence (1057–1116); San Miniato
- Official languages: Latin
- Religion: Chalcedonian Christianity (846–1054); Roman Catholicism (1054–1197)
- Government: Feudal monarchy
- Margrave of Tuscany
  - 812–813: Boniface I (first)
  - 847–884: Adalbert I
  - 931–936: Boso of Arles
  - 1076–1115: Matilda
- Historical era: Early Middle Ages
  - Adalbert I granted margraviate: 846
  - Granted to Boso: 931
  - Rainier deposed in favour of House of Canossa: 1027
  - Formation of Tuscan League: 1197
  - Claimed by Papacy: 1198
Preceded by
Middle Francia
Succeeded by
Commune of Arezzo
Republic of Florence
Republic of Lucca
Commune of Pistoia
Republic of Pisa
Poggibonsi
Commune of Prato
Republic of Siena
Volterra
- Today part of: Italy

The March of Tuscany (Note: Latin: Marchiae Tusciae; modern Italian: Marca di Tuscia, pronounced [ˈmarka di ˈtuʃʃa]. Also called a margrav(i)ate or marquisate (Italian: marchesato). The terms are synonymous with "march" (Latin: marca) and derive from the title of the Tuscan rulers: margrave (from German Markgraf), or marquis, which became a mere rank of nobility, even used as sinecure (themselves from Latin marchio).) was a march of the Kingdom of Italy and the Holy Roman Empire during the Middle Ages. Located in northwestern central Italy, it bordered the Papal States to the south, the Ligurian Sea to the west and Lombardy to the north. It comprised a collection of counties, largely in the valley of the River Arno, originally centered on Lucca.

== History ==
The march was a Carolingian creation, a successor of the Lombard Duchy of Tuscia. After the fall of the Western Roman Empire, Tuscia from 568 had been part of the Italian Kingdom of the Lombards (Langobardia Major) until, in 754, the Frankish kings intervened in the conflict with Pope Stephen II. By the Donation of Pepin, the southern part of Tuscia around Viterbo became part of the newly established Papal States, while the northern part (or Lombard Tuscany) developed into the Imperial March of Tuscany after Charlemagne had finally conquered the Lombard kingdom in 773/74. Lombardy proper became the nucleus of the Imperial kingdom of Italy, together with the marches of Tuscany and Verona.

The first Tuscan margrave was Adalbert I, who was granted that title in 846. Before him, his father and grandfather, Count Boniface I of Lucca and Boniface II, probably of Bavarian origin, had controlled most of the counties of the region and had held higher titles as well, such as prefect of Corsica or duke of Lucca. The Bonifacii held the march until 931. During the late ninth and early tenth century, the support of the margraves of Tuscany was instrumental for any candidate intent on becoming king of Italy.

In 931, Hugh of Arles, who had made himself king of Italy, dispossessed the Bonifacii in an attempt to consolidate all the important fiefs of Italy in his relatives' hands. He granted Tuscany to his brother Boso. It remained in the hands of members of the family known as the Bosonids down to 1001. It also retained its influence regarding royal elections. As late as 1027, Rainier was deposed from the march by Holy Roman Emperor Conrad II for opposing him as king.

In 1027, the duchy was granted to the counts of Canossa. Boniface III used the title dux et marchio: duke and margrave. He was an ally of the Holy Roman emperors, but his power was so great that he threatened that of the emperors in Italy. He united the Canossa inheritance, which was largely in the Emilia, to Tuscany and passed it on to his daughter Matilda. Besides her vast Emilian allods, her greatest possession was Tuscany, held in feudal tenure, and she wielded it to the benefit of the Papacy in the Investiture Controversy. With Matilda's death in 1115, the era of the feudal princes had passed in northern Italy, to be replaced by the dominance of the city-states, maritime republics and communes.

== Margraves of Tuscany, 812–1197 ==
=== House of Boniface ===
These were originally counts of Lucca who extended their power over the neighbouring counties.

- Boniface I, 812–823
- Boniface II, 828–834
- Aganus, 835–845
- Adalbert I, 847–886
- Adalbert II the Rich, 886–915
- Guy, 915–929
- Lambert, 929–931

=== House of Boso ===
These were the (mostly illegitimate) relatives of Hugh of Arles, King of Italy, whom he appointed to their post after removing the dynasty of Boniface

- Boso, 931–936
- Humbert, 936–961
- Hugh the Great, 961–1001

=== House of Hucpold ===
- Boniface (III), 1004–1011

=== Non-dynastic ===
- Rainier, 1014–1027

=== House of Canossa ===
These were the descendants of the Counts of Canossa.

- Boniface III, 1027–1052
- Frederick, 1052–1055
- Matilda, 1055–1115
  - Beatrice of Bar, 1052–1069 (regent as mother of Frederick and Mathilda)
  - Godfrey the Bearded, Duke of Lower Lorraine, 1053–1069 (regent as husband of Beatrice and step-father to Frederick and Matilda)
  - Godfrey the Hunchback, Duke of Lower Lorraine, 1069–1076 (co-ruler as husband of Matilda)
  - Welf II, 1089–1095 (co-ruler as husband of Matilda)

=== Non-dynastic ===
- Rabodo, 1116–1119
- Conrad, 1119/20–1129/31
- Rampret, c. 1131
- Engelbert, 1134/5–1137
- Henry the Proud, 1137–1139
- Ulrich of Attems, 1139–1152 (imperial vicar)
- Welf VI, 1152–1160
- Welf VII, 1160–1167
  - Rainald of Dassel, Archbishop of Cologne, 1160–1163 (imperial vicar)
  - Christian of Buch, Archbishop of Mainz 1163–1173 (imperial vicar)
- Welf VI, 1167–1173
- Philip, 1195–1197

In 1197 Philip was elected King of Germany and the majority of the Tuscan nobility, cities and bishops formed the Tuscan League with Papal backing.

- Frederick of Antioch, 1246–51 (imperial vicar and King of Tuscany)

After this, Tuscany was splintered between the competing republics of Florence, Pisa, Siena, Arezzo, Pistoia and Lucca. Since the 14th century, Florence gained dominance over Pistoia (1306, officially annexed 1530), Arezzo (1384), Pisa (1406), and Siena (1559). Lucca was an independent republic until the Napoleonic period in the 19th century.

== See also ==
- List of rulers of Tuscany
- Italian city-states

== Sources ==
- Wickham, Chris. Early Medieval Italy: Central Power and Local Society 400–1000. MacMillan Press: 1981.
