= Radbod =

Radbod, Radbot, Ratbod, Ratpot, Redbod, Redbad, Radboud, Rapoto, or sometimes just Boddo, is a Germanic masculine first name that may refer to:

- Radbod of Frisia, leader of the Frisians (died 719)
- Radbod (prefect) (833–854), Frankish prefect
- Ratbod (archbishop of Trier) (died 915)
- Radboud of Utrecht (died 917), bishop
- Radbot, Count of Klettgau (c. 985–1045), ancestor of Europe's Habsburg Dynasty
- Rabodo, marquis of Tuscany (died 1119, r. 1116–1119)

It may also refer to

- Radboud University Nijmegen, named after Saint Radboud
- Radboud University Nijmegen Medical Centre
- Redbad (film), 2018 Dutch film
