= De Miseria Condicionis Humane =

12th century Latin text by Innocent III

De Miseria Condicionis Humane (English: On the wretchedness of the human condition), also known as Liber de contemptu mundi, sive De miseria humanae conditionis, is a twelfth-century religious text written in Latin by Cardinal Lotario dei Conti di Segni, later Pope Innocent III.

== Structure ==
The text is divided into three parts: in the first part the wretchedness of the human body and the various hardships one has to bear throughout life are described; the second part lists man's futile ambitions, i.e. affluence, pleasure and esteem, and the third deals with the decay of the human corpse, the anguish of the damned in hell, and the Day of Judgment.

== Background ==
Lotario, still a cardinal, began writing De Miseria Condicionis Humane sometime between late December 1194 and early April 1195.

According to Robert E. Lewis, the editor of the most recent translation in English, approximately 672 manuscripts of the text are extant.

The text in the 1978 Lewis edition is an unemended transcription of a manuscript from the British Library (British Library, Lansdowne 358, ff. 78-109v), originally kept at the Benedictine Abbey of St. Martin in Battle, East Sussex.

== In popular culture ==
Innocent's work was widely disseminated and quoted in the medieval period. In the G version of the Prologue to The Legend of Good Women it is stated that the work was translated by Chaucer as Of the Wreched Engendrynge of Mankynde; the translation does not survive, but Chaucer's familiarity with the work is evident from allusions elsewhere in his writing. Chaucer's translation seems to have been made between the date of the F Prologue to The Legend of Good Women, in which it does not appear, and the writing of the G Prologue, in which it does, that is between 1384–6 and 1394–5.

De Miseria Condicionis Humane is mentioned in Thomas Mann's novel The Magic Mountain (first published in 1924) when the Jesuit intellectual Leo Naphta and Hans Castorp contemplate on Gothic pessimistic asceticism. Naphta describes De Miseria Condicionis Humane as 'a very witty literary work' or, in another translation, 'an exceedingly witty piece of writing.' He loans Hans Castorp a 'crumbling paperback edition' or 'crumbling pasteboard volume' (most likely the 1855 Achterfeldt edition) to Hans Castorp from his personal library.

== Modern editions ==
- Innocentii III, De contemptu mundi sive de miseria humanae conditionis libri tres, J.H. Achterfeldt ed. (Bonn 1855). (Latin)
- Lotharii Cardinalis (Innocentii III), De Miseria Humane Conditionis, M. Maccarone ed. (Lugano 1955). (Latin)
- Lotario dei Segni (Pope Innocent III), De Miseria Condicionis Humane, Robert E. Lewis ed. (Athens, Georgia 1978). (Latin and English)
