= Sigifred of Lucca =

10th-century Lombard nobleman

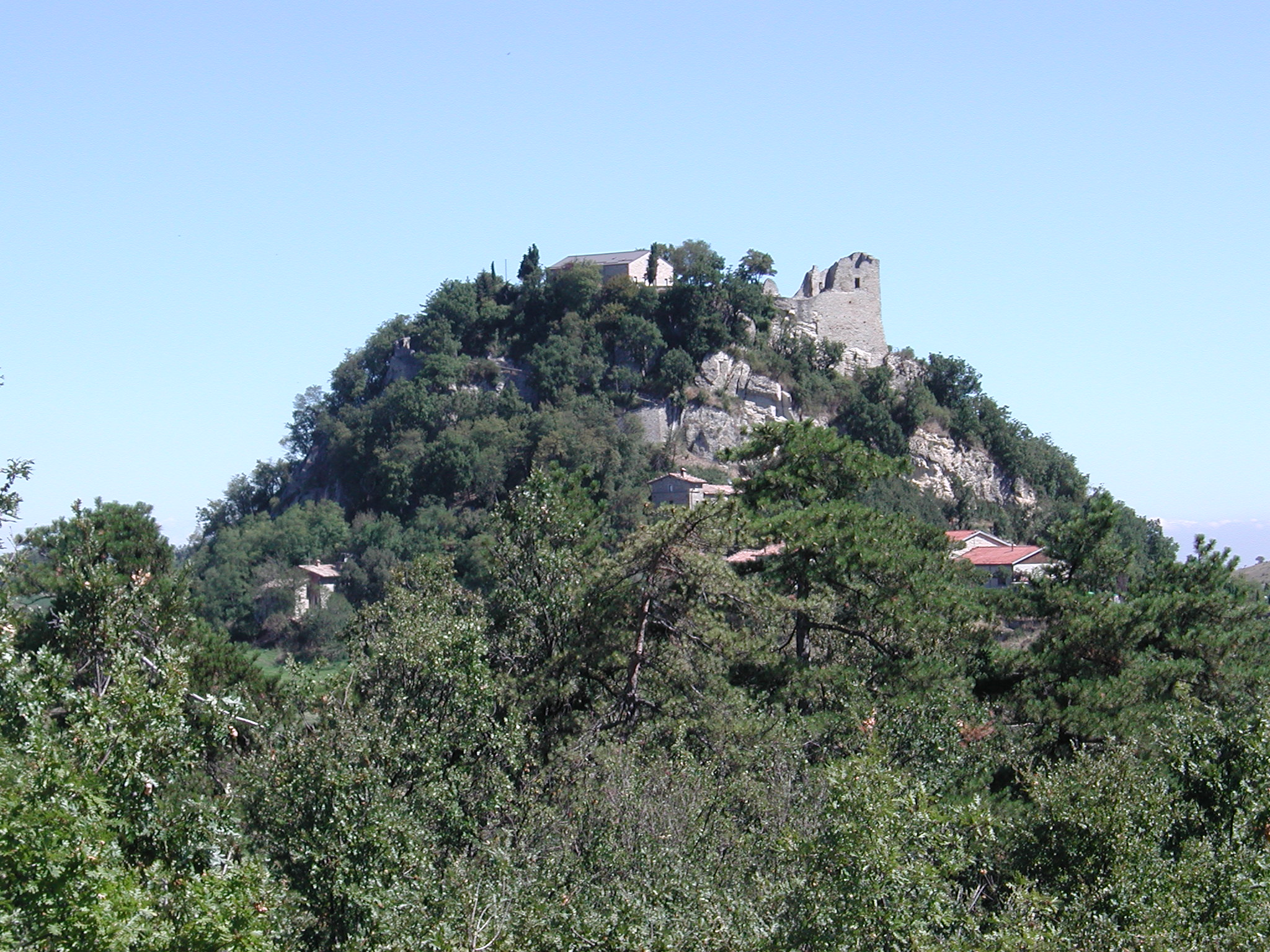
Lucca

Sigifred of Lucca (also Sigefred, Siegfried) (died after 940) was a Lombard nobleman and the progenitor of the House of Canossa.

Donizo, the 12th-century biographer of the Canossa dynasty, refers to Sigifred as coming from ‘the county of Lucca’ (de comitatu Lucensis). Little is known about Sigifred. Although he was from Lucca, he was probably not count of Lucca. He moved from Tuscany to Emilia-Romagna c.924-930 when Hugh of Italy endowed him with lands around Parma. Sigifred also gained control of lands around Brescia.

With his wife, whose identity is not known, Sigifred had at least three sons:

- Adalbert Atto of Canossa
- Sigifred, progenitor of the Baratti dynasty
- Gerard, progenitor of the Guiberti dynasty

== See also ==
- Republic of Venice, were ended the Silk Road
- Charlemagne, who banned usury to the Christian.
- Florence, finance center of Europe Medieval Bankers with Venetian gold until 1440 Black Death.
