= Adalbert I of Tuscany =

9th Century Margrave of Tuscany

Adalbert I
- Margrave of Tuscany
- Born: 820
- Died: 886
- Noble family: Boniface
- Issue: Adalbert II
- Father: Boniface II, Margrave of Tuscany

Adalbert I (c. 820 – 886) was the margrave of Tuscany from about 847 and the guardian of the island of Corsica (tutor Corsicae insulae).

== Biography ==
He was the son of Boniface II of Tuscany, who had been despoiled of his fiefs by the Emperor Lothair I, and successor of his elder brother Aganus. The reign of Adalbert was long and successful.

He took the side of King Carloman of Bavaria against King Charles the Bald of France in the struggle for the Kingdom of Italy, despite the latter being supported by the pope. When the Roman court persisted in this "interference", Adalbert marched on Rome, forced John VIII to take refuge in the St Peter's Basilica, and forced the Roman citizens to swear fealty to Carloman. Excommunication by Pope John had little effect on him.

He married Rothild, daughter of Guy I of Spoleto.

He died in 884 or, more probably 886, and was succeeded by his son Adalbert II.

== Sources ==
- Reuter, Timothy, ed. (1999). The New Cambridge Medieval History. Vol. 3, C.900 – c.1024. Cambridge University Press.

Preceded by Aganus	Margrave of Tuscany; 847–886	Succeeded by Adalbert II
