= Boniface, Count of Bologna =

Boniface (III) was the Count of Bologna and Margrave of Tuscany from about 1004 to his death, probably in 1011.

He was the son of Adalbert, Count of Bologna, and his wife Bertila. He succeeded his father in Bologna and was created margrave of Tuscany sometime before 1004. By 1007, he had founded the abbey of Fonte Taona. His son Hugh, Count of Bologna was made Duke of Spoleto.

Preceded by Hugh	Margrave of Tuscany; 1004–1011	Succeeded by Rainier
