= Rainier of Tuscany =

Ranieri of Tuscany (died c. 1027), a member of the Bourbon del Monte Santa Maria family, was the Margrave of Tuscany from around 1014 until his death. He is also believed to have held the titles of Duke of Spoleto and Camerino.

== Early life and ancestry ==
Ranieri's legendary origin as one of the sons of Count Arduino and Countess Willa di Ugo or Gisla is in conflict with historical records. This is because Ranieri was already governing Tuscany when the marriage between Willa and Arduino took place.

In reality, Ranieri was born in the 10th century to Count Guido Ripuario. However, it is unclear whether this Count Guido was the son of Count Teudegrimo, who had a close relationship with King Hugh around 927 and became the ancestor of the Guidi counts, or if he belonged to the Alberti counts of Panico and Vernio, both of Ripuarian origin and law. Most sources suggest that Ranieri's father, Count Guido, was the son of Margrave Ugo, who founded the Abbey of Santa Maria in Petroio in 960, located in the territory of Perugia.

It is historically confirmed that Ranieri was the brother of Elemperto or Alimberto, the Bishop of Arezzo. It is possible that one of his ancestors was Suppone (V?) from the Supponid lineage.

== Governance of Tuscany ==
After Margrave Bonifacio III died, Ranieri took control of Tuscany and possibly also gained authority over Camerino and Spoleto. In 1014, a decree mentioned in Cronica di Farfa was signed by both Margrave and Duke Ranieri in the tower of Corneto (now Tarquinia), confirming his rule over the March and the ducal territories of Spoleto. Another decree held in Corneto that same year was overseen by a gastaldo (a magistrate) appointed by Duke and Margrave Ranieri, in support of Abbot Winizzone of Abbadia San Salvatore regarding properties owned by the abbey near the Marta River. These events indicate that Ranieri governed the region as its lord.

In 1015, a document found in the Florentine Diplomatic Archive reveals that Margrave Ranieri, son of Count Guido, made a donation to the Amiatine Abbey, which confirmed his marriage to Countess Waldrada, daughter of Guglielmo, and the birth of their son Ranieri. During the same year, Ranieri returned several properties to the monks of the Marturi Abbey, which had been seized by his predecessor. However, it is believed that he retained some of the properties for himself, according to the Camaldolese Annals. Additional decrees in 1015 and 1016, respectively issued from Stazzano above Pistoia and Arezzo, demonstrate Ranieri's active involvement in supporting various abbeys and religious institutions.

== Later years and legacy ==
Between 1019 and 1026, there is no historical mention of Ranieri Bourbon del Monte Santa Maria ruling over Tuscany, nor are there any records of his son Ranieri. It is possible that the younger Ranieri, who would have succeeded his father, died at a young age. However, in archival records from 1026 to 1027, the name Ranieri reappears. During this period, he fortified himself in Lucca with the intention of obstructing Conrad II's path to Rome for his imperial coronation. These hostile actions against the new sovereign may have led to Ranieri's downfall and the loss of his control over Tuscany. After 1026, there are no public records mentioning Margrave Ranieri del Monte Santa Maria.

From 1028 onwards, historical accounts mention another Margrave and Duke of Tuscany named Bonifacio, who followed Lombard law. He was the father of the renowned Countess Matilda. It is possible that the unfortunate events involving Ranieri prompted Peter Damian to write a critical letter to Willa. Willa had married a nephew of Margrave Ranieri, and Damian described their marriage as doomed despite its apparent wealth and prestige.

Margrave Ranieri I is recorded as deceased in 1030, as stated in a document dated October 19 of that year. This document also mentions his urban possessions in Arezzo. Additionally, a deed from December 1031 refers to certain properties near Arezzo that belonged to Ranieri, the son of Count Guido, who held the title of Margrave.

Preceded by Boniface III	Margrave of Tuscany; 1014–1027	Succeeded by Boniface IV
