= Annales florentini =

Annals of Florence

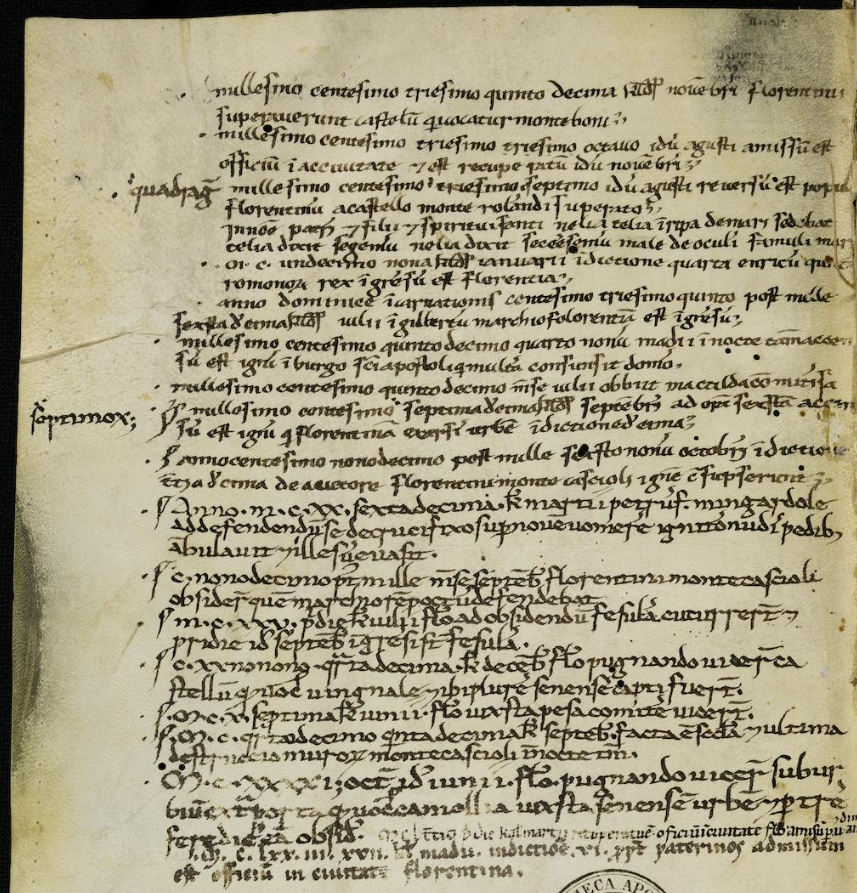
The Annales florentini primi in the Vatican manuscript. They are not in chronological order. At the top is the entry for the Florentine destruction of Montebuono in October 1135.

The Annales florentini (Florentine annals, Italian Annali fiorentini) are the earliest annals of the medieval commune of Florence. They are written in Latin. There are two sets of annals overlapping in coverage: the Annales florentini primi covering the period 1110–1173 and the Annales florentini secundi covering 1107–1247. A later set covers the period 1288–1431.

The Annales florentini primi constitute the earliest, tentative attempt to keep a yearly record of events in Florence. It was discovered on the back (verso) of the 91st folio of Codex 772 in the Vatican Palatine Library by the librarian, who brought it to the attention of scholars. It does not contain a record for every year between 1110 and 1173. There are only eighteen records in several different handwritings and not arranged chronologically. The writing is clearly from the twelfth century.

The Annales florentini secundi date to the thirteenth century. There are 46 records between the years 1107 and 1247. They are found in a manuscript originating in the monastery of Santa Maria Novella, now No. 776 E. A. in the Suppressed Monasteries series of the Magliabecchian Library, now part of the National Library at Florence. This same manuscript contains a list of Florentine consuls and podestàs from 1196 to 1267.

== Editions ==
- "Annales Florentini, a. 1110–1173". In Georg Heinrich Pertz, ed., MGH, Scriptores, vol. 19, pp. 223–224. Hanover: 1866.
- "Annales Florentini, 1288–1431". In Johannes F. Boehmer, ed., Fontes Rerum Germanicarum, vol. 4, pp. 672–86. Stuttgart: 1868.
- "Annales Florentini". In Otto Hartwig, ed., Quellen und Forschungen zur altesten Geschichte der Stadt Florenz, vol. 2. Marburg: 1880.
