= Rabodo =

German Imperial Vicar and marquis of Tuscany

- Imperial Vicar; Marquis of Tuscany
- Reign: 1116-1119
- Predecessor: Matilda of Tuscany
- Successor: Conrad of Scheyern

Rabodo (or Rapoto) was the imperial vicar and marquis of Tuscany from 1116 until his death in battle in 1119.

A German count, Rabodo was appointed by the Emperor Henry V after the death of the Marchioness Matilda of Tuscany (1115) in order to break the practice of hereditary succession in the Tuscan marquisate. He was a much weaker ruler than his predecessor, unable to dominate the many disparate forces opposed to direct imperial (or German) rule. This weakness is often associated with the rise of autonomous city government in Florence. In a document of 11 September 1116, Rabodo is called "marquis of Tuscany owing to imperial largesse", (Note: Ex largitione imperatoris marchio Tusciae.) but in one dated to 1119 he is said to rule "by God's grace", using the same formula used by Matilda. (Note: Rabodo Dei gratia si quid est.)

He moved the Tuscan capital from Florence, where it had been since 1057, to the fortified town of San Miniato al Tedesco, (Note: This is the origin of the epithet "al Tedesco" (i.e., the German), which was only dropped in the 20th century.) thereafter the seat of the imperial vicars into the 13th century. He brought with him a German entourage, referenced with contempt in many contemporary documents merely as the Teutonici (Germans). In 1116 Rabodo pledged the castle of Bientina to Archbishop Pietro Moriconi of Pisa and the Pisan judge (iudex) and operator (operarius) Ildebrando. This pledge was witnessed by four consuls of the commune of the city of Pisa. Rabodo disputed the jurisdictional claims of the commune of Florence and established an alliance with the city's rivals, the Alberti counts. He took the castle of Monte Cascioli, which was coveted by the Alberti, from the Florentines in 1119. The Florentines assaulted the castle twice, and Rabodo was killed defending it. The castle was burnt to the ground. (Note: The later Florentine chronicler Giovanni Villani confused the attack of 1119 with an earlier attack of 1113 and incorrectly called Rabodo "Robert the German". The Annales florentini state of the 1119 attacks: marchio Rempoctus defendebat (marquis Rempoctus defended [it]) and Monte Cascioli ignem consumpserunt (Monte Cascioli they consumed with fire).) His successor, Conrad of Scheyern, another German, was in office by 1120.
