= Beatrice of Lorraine =

Marchioness of Tuscany (c. 1020–1076)

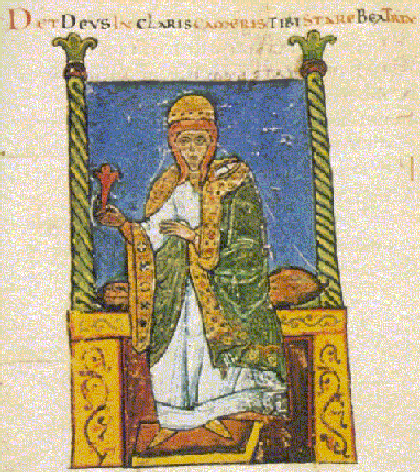
- A miniature of Beatrice from the early twelfth-century manuscript of Donizo's Vita Mathildis (Codex Vat. Lat. 4922, fol. 30v.). The script at the top reads: Det Deus in claris cameris tibi stare Beatrix (God grant that you rest in celestial chambers, Beatrice). For a clearer black-and-white image, see here

Regent of Margraviate of Tuscany
- Reign: c. 1052 – 18 April 1076
- Monarchs: Frederick of Tuscany (1052–1055); Matilda of Tuscany (1055–1076)
- Born: c. 1020
- Died: 18 April 1076 (aged 56); Margraviate of Tuscany
- Spouse: Boniface III of Tuscany
- Issue: Frederick of Tuscany; Matilda of Tuscany
- House: House of Ardennes
- Father: Frederick II of Upper Lorraine
- Mother: Matilda of Swabia

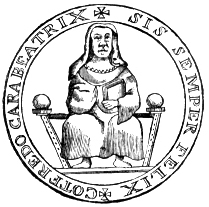
Line drawing of Beatrice's seal by Ludovico Antonio Muratori (1738). The original wax seal is still extant and attached to a grant Beatrice made to the church of San Zeno in Verona in 1073. The script around the seal reads: SIS SEMPER FELIX, COTFREDO CARA BEATRIX (Beatrice, dear to Godfrey, may you always be happy).

Beatrice of Bar (also Beatrix; c. 1020 – 18 April 1076) was the marchioness of Tuscany by marriage to Boniface III of Tuscany, and Regent of Tuscany from 1052 until her death, during the reign of her son Fredrick and later during the minority of and in co-regency with, her daughter Matilda. She was the daughter of Frederick II, Duke of Upper Lorraine, count of Bar, and Matilda of Swabia. She was married first to Boniface III of Tuscany and later to Godfrey of Lotharingia.

== Life ==
Beatrice was born in what is now northeastern France around 1020. She was also known as Beatrice of Tuscany or Beatrice of Canossa.

After her father Duke Frederick II of Upper Lorraine died in 1026, she and her sister Sophie went to live with their mother's sister, Empress Gisela at the imperial court.

c.1037/8, she became the second wife of Boniface III of Tuscany in a splendid ceremony. She had the following children:

- Beatrice (died 17 December 1053)
- Frederick (died July 1055), briefly successor before imprisonment
- Matilda (1046 – 24 July 1115), successor as marchioness of Tuscany

=== Regency ===
With Boniface's death on 6 May 1052, Beatrice assumed the regency for her son Frederick. Little is else is known about her life before the murder of her husband In 1054, to give her son the protection she could not militarily provide, she married her cousin, Godfrey, former duke of Lower Lorraine. However, in 1055, the Emperor Henry III arrested Beatrice for marrying a traitor. She was brought to Germany a prisoner while Frederick was summoned to Henry's court at Florence. He refused to go and died before any action was taken against him. The heir of Boniface was now his youngest daughter Matilda, who was imprisoned with her mother.

On the death of Henry, Godfrey was reconciled with his heir, Henry IV, and exiled to Italy with his wife and stepdaughter. In January 1058, as a partisan of the newly elected Pope Nicholas II, Leo de Benedicto had the gates of the Leonine City thrown open for Godfrey and Beatrice. Godfrey immediately possessed the Tiber Island and attacked the Lateran, forcing Benedict X to flee on January 24. Beatrice and Godfrey were allied with the reformers, including Hildebrand and Pope Alexander II, against the emperor. In 1062, Beatrice tried to stop the Antipope Honorius II from reaching Rome.

In 1069, Godfrey died. Matilda was of age, yet Beatrice continued to exercise government in her name until the day she died.

On 29 August 1071, Beatrice and her daughter, Matilda, founded the monastery Frassinoro at the Apennine pass of Foce della Radici. In 1074–1076, Beatrice was a key negotiator in the dispute between Pope Gregory VII and her kinsman, King Henry IV of Germany over certain rights in episcopal appointments.

=== Death ===
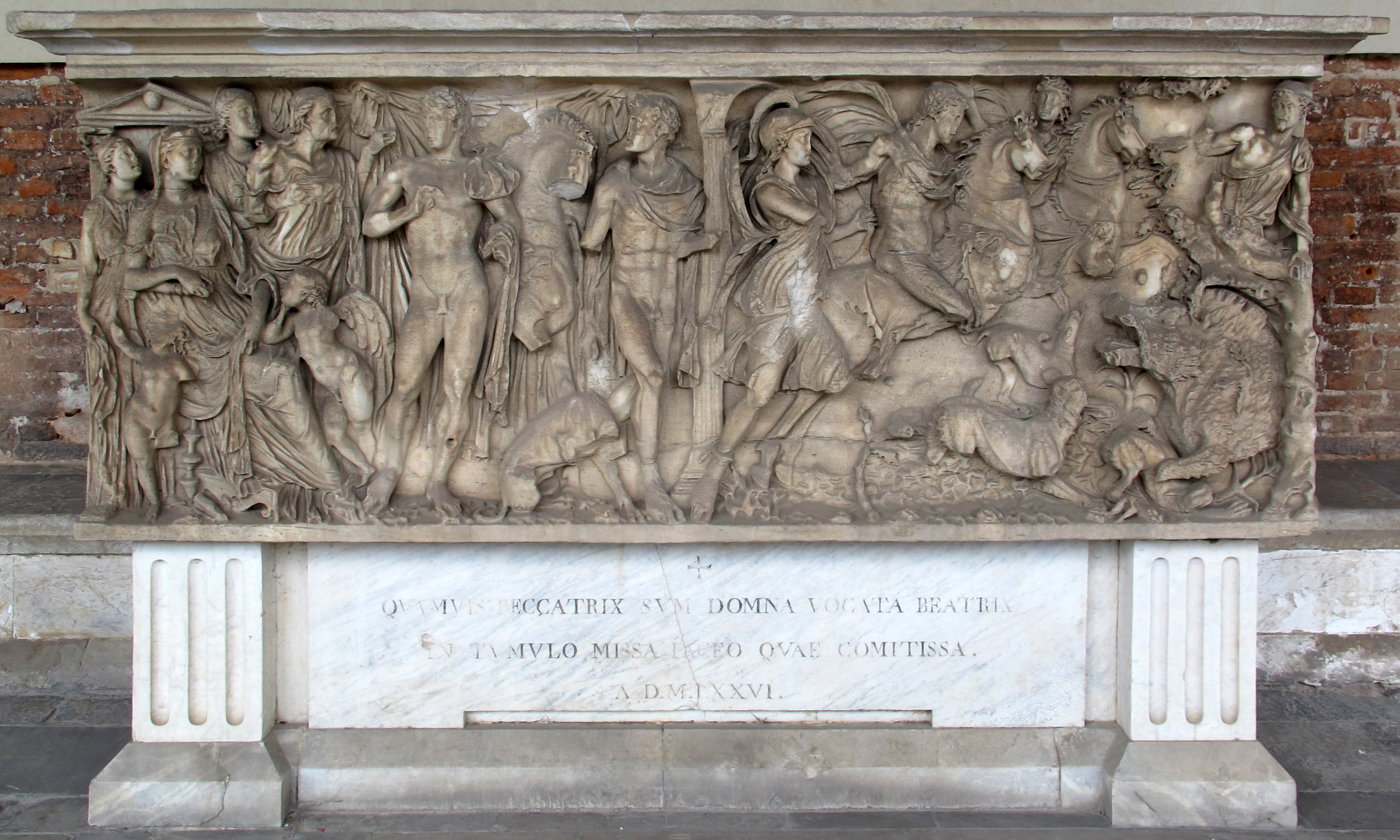
Beatrice's sarcophagus, now located in the Campo Santo at Pisa.

Beatrice died at Pisa on 18 April 1076. She was buried in the Cathedral of Pisa, in a Late Roman sarcophagus, bearing reliefs illustrating the story of Hippolytus and Phaedra. (Nicola Pisano adapted nude figures for his pulpit in the cathedral from the sarcophagus; they can still be seen in the cathedral.) Beatrice's sarcophagus is now located in the Campo Santo in the cathedral square. The inscription around the sarcophagus, which was added in the eleventh century for Beatrice, reads:

Quamvis peccatrix sum domna vocata Beatrix
In tumulo missa iaceo quæ comitissa
Quilibet ergo pater noster, det pro mea anima ter.

("Although a sinner, I was called Lady Beatrice. I, who was a countess, lie in this grave . Whoever wishes may say three Our Fathers for my soul.")

== Sources ==
- Lexikon des Mittelalters: Beatrix von Ober-Lothringen, Markgräfin von Tuszien. (in German)
- M.G. Bertolini, Beatrice di Lorena, marchesa e duchessa di Toscana in Dizionario Biografico degli Italiani 7 (1970).
- A. Creber, "Women at Canossa. The Role of Royal and Aristocratic Women in the Reconciliation between Pope Gregory VII and Henry IV of Germany", in V. Eads and T. Lazzari, eds., Matilda 900: Remembering Matilda of Canossa Wide World, a special edition of Storicamente 13 (2017), article no. 13, pp. 1–44 (Open Access).
- Cowdrey, H. E. J. (1998). Pope Gregory VII, 1073-1085. Clarendon Press.
- P. Golinelli, Matilde di Canossa Una donna protagonista del suo tempo un mito intramontabile, Roma, Salerno Editrice,2021.
- E. Goez, Beatrix von Canossa und Tuszien. Eine Untersuchung zur Geschichte des 11. Jahrhunderts (Sigmaringen, 1995).
- Gregorovius, Ferdinand. Rome in the Middle Ages Vol. IV Part 1. 1905.
- Kagay & Villalon (2003). Crusaders, Condottieri, and Cannon: Medieval Warfare in Societies around the Mediterranean. Koninklijke Brill NV.
- T. Lazzari, "Matilda of Tuscany: New Perspectives about Her Family Ties", in V. Eads and T. Lazzari, eds., Matilda 900: Remembering Matilda of Canossa Wide World, a special edition of Storicamente 13 (2017), article no. 28, pp. 1–26 (Open Access).
- Nash, Penelope (2017). Empress Adelheid and Countess Matilda: Medieval Female Rulership and the Foundations of European Society. Palgrave Macmillan.
- Whitney, J.P. (1968). "The Reform of the Church". In Tanner, J.R.; Previte-Orton, C.W.; Brooke, Z.N. (eds.). The Cambridge Medieval History. Vol. V. Cambridge University Press.
