= Giselbert II of Bergamo =

Giselbert II (died between 993 and 1010) was the count of Bergamo. He was a member of the dynasty known to historians as the Giselbertiners (or Giselbertini).

== Life ==
Giselbert was the son of Lanfranc I of Bergamo. He is first documented as count of Bergamo in 961 (although he probably had held the position for some time before this).

Giselbert supported Otto I, Holy Roman Emperor against Berengar II of Italy. As a reward, in 970 Otto I granted Giselbert II property in the counties of Bergamo, Brescia, Como and Pavia, which had been confiscated from Count Bernard of Pavia. In 976 Otto II appointed Giselbert II count palatine of Bergamo.

== Marriage and children ==
With his wife, Anselda (or Alsinda) of Turin, daughter of Arduin Glaber, Giselbert II had several children, including:

- Lanfranc II of Bergamo
- Maginfred
- Arduin I
- Gisela, wife of Hugh of Milan (son of Otbert II, Margrave of Milan)
- Richelida, wife of Boniface III of Tuscany
