= Adalbert Atto of Canossa =

First Count of Canossa (died 988)

Adalbert Atto
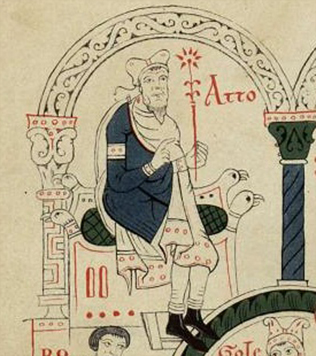
- Successor: Tedald
- Died: 13 February 988
- Noble family: House of Canossa
- Spouse: Hildegard (of the Supponid family)
- Father: Sigifred of Lucca

Adalbert Atto (or Adalberto Azzo) (died 13 February 988) was the first Count of Canossa and founder of that noble house which eventually was to play a determinant role in the political settling of Regnum Italicum and the Investiture Controversy in the eleventh and twelfth centuries.

== Countship ==
Adalbert first appears in sources as a son of Sigifred of Lucca. He was originally a vassal of King Lothair II and a legionary of Adelard, Bishop of Reggio. He rose to prominence rapidly by sheltering Adelaide of Italy in his castle at Canossa after she fled from the castle of Garda (951), where Berengar II of Italy had imprisoned her.

After Otto I wed Adelaide of Italy, Otto I awarded Adalbert with the countships of Reggio nell'Emilia and Modena. According to the Chronicon Novaliciense, Adalbert was gifted the countship because he had helped Adelaide of Italy.

With Adelaide of Italy, he negotiated a division of power with the bishop of Reggio whereby the bishop was confirmed as comes civitatis, count of the city, and Adalbert as comes comitatus, count of the county, where the county was said to begin three or four miles outside the city walls. He appears with a similar title, comes comitatus Mantuanensis, in Mantua in a letter of the abbess of Santa Giulia dated 10 June 977.

In 984 Adalbert appears in the records as a margrave. When Henry II, Duke of Bavaria, was acclaimed as king that year, he united Parma, the County of Piacenza, Bergamo, Cremona, and Brescia to Adalbert's territories. However, Henry's usurpation of the throne was brief.

== Death and legacy ==
Adalbert built a monastery at Canossa in 961, dedicated to S. Apollonio in 971. He also built a monastery at Brescello. He and his family were all buried in S. Apollonio.

Adalbert married the Supponid Hildegard (Ildegarda) and had three sons: Geoffrey, Bishop of Brescia, Tedaldo Count of Reggio, as well as Rudolph, who predeceased him. He had a daughter Prangarda who married Manfredo I Marchese of Turin, Conte d´Auriate, and Marchese of Susa-Piemonte.

== Sources ==
- Wickham, Chris. Early Medieval Italy: Central Power and Local Society 400-1000. MacMillan Press: 1981.
- Duff, Nora (1909). Matilda of Tuscany: La Gran Donna d'Italia. London: Methuen & Co.
- Caravale, Mario. (ed) Dizionario Biografico degli Italiani. Rome.
