= Boniface II of Tuscany =

9th-century Margrave of Tuscany and Duke of Lucca

Boniface II (died c. 838) was the count and duke of Lucca (from 5 October 823) and first margrave of Tuscany from about 828. He succeeded his father Boniface I, Margrave of Tuscany in Lucca—in what was an early example of hereditary succession—and extended his power over the region. During his tenure, the bishops of Lucca gradually lost control of the municipal government, which fell to the counts.

Since 770, the counts of Lucca had been charged with the coastal defence of Tuscany and Corsica. In February 825, at Marengo, the Emperor Lothair I emanated a Capitulare de expeditione corsicana for the defence of the island. In 828, Boniface received the titles of prefectus and tutela over the island from Lothair and the legateship of the island from the bishop of Luni. In July and August 828, he led a small fleet in search of Saracen pirates. Finding none at sea, the fleet landed at Sardinia and there decided to attack Africa. They assaulted the Saracen coast between Utica and Carthage with success. The fleet then returned to Corsica.

In 833, Boniface backed Louis the Pious against his son Lothair, who promptly dispossessed him and put Aganus in his place. In 834, he joined with Ratald, Bishop of Verona, and Pepin I, Count of Vermandois, to free the Empress Judith of Bavaria from her convent-prison. They escorted her back to Louis at Aachen. Boniface spent the years 836 to 838 in Germany at court.

Eventually he retired to hereditary lands in southern France. He was invited to participate in the trial of Bernard of Septimania, but died before he could. His son Adalbert regained the Tuscan march later.

== Sources ==
- Wickham, Chris. Early Medieval Italy: Central Power and Local Society 400-1000. MacMillan Press: 1981.

Italian nobility
Preceded by Boniface I	Margrave of Tuscany; 828–834	Succeeded by Aganus
