= House of Canossa =

Italian noble family

The House of Canossa was an Italian noble family from Lucca holding the castle of Canossa, from the early tenth to the early twelfth century.

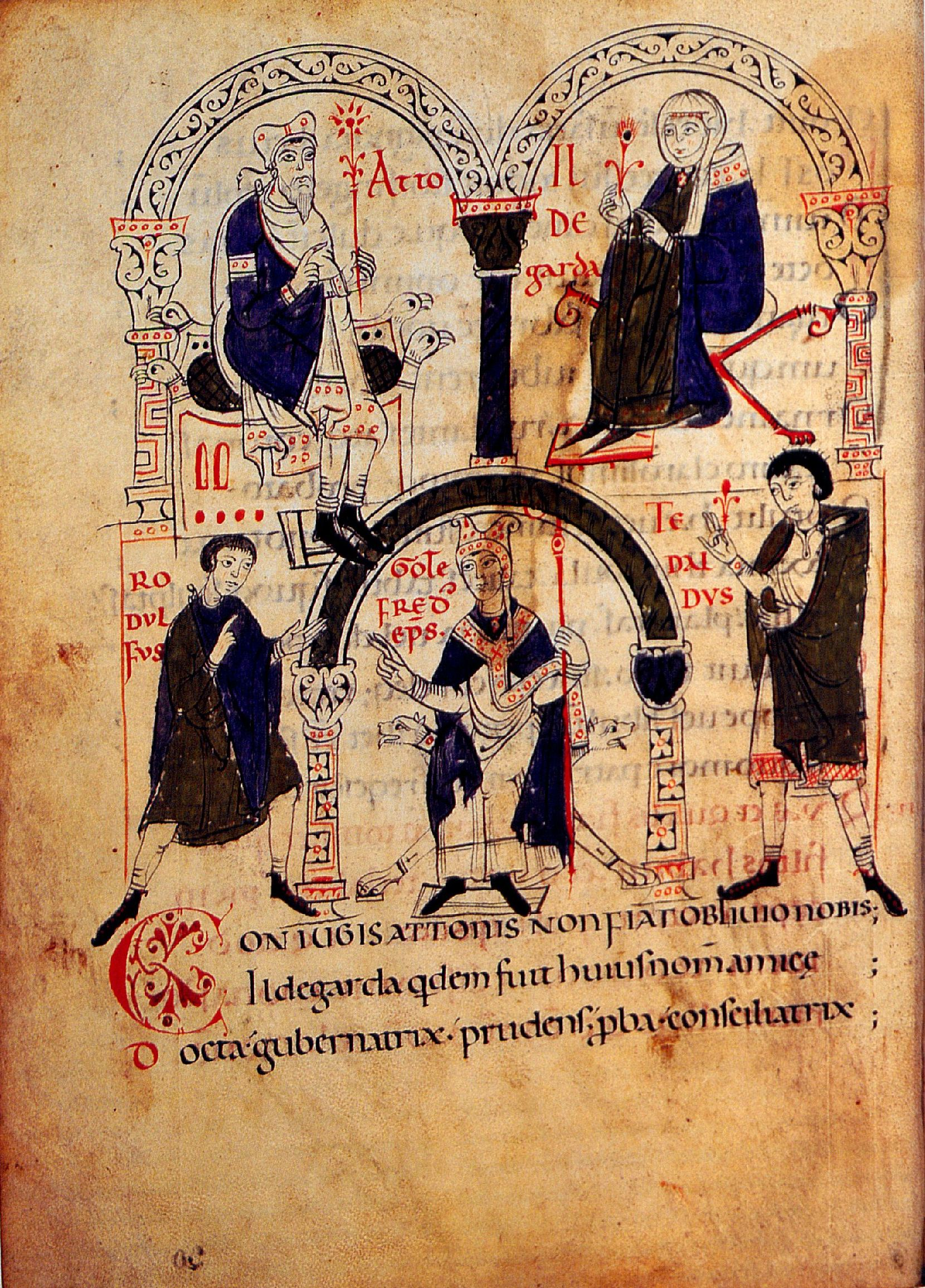
Adalbert-Atto of Canossa and his wife Hildegard surrounded by arches above their three sons Rudolph, Geoffrey (Gotofred), and the grandfather of Matilda, Tedald - Donizo's Vita Mathildis (Vatican Library, Codex Vat. Lat. 4922, fol. 20v)

The House of Canossa were also known as the Attonids. The oldest proven ancestor was the nobleman Sigifred, who lived in the county of Lucca during the first third of the tenth century. He probably increased his sphere of influence in the area around Parma and in the foothills of the Apennines. His son, Adalbert-Atto, was able to bring several castles in the foothills of the Apennines under his control in the politically fragmented region. Adalbert-Atto married Hildegard, of the Supponid Frankish noble family who had been very influential in northern Italy.

Adalbert-Atto built the Canossa Castle in the southwest of the mountains of Reggio Emilia. After the unexpectred death of King Lothair II of Italy in 950, Adalbert-Atto provided refuge in Canossa Castle to Lothair's widow, Queen Adelaide, after Berengar of Ivrea attempted to take power in Italy and imprisoned her for a short time. King Otto I of East Francia then intervened in Italy and married Adelaide in 951. This resulted in a close bond between the House of Canossa and the Ottonian dynasty. Adalbert-Atto appeared in documents from the reign of Otto I as an advocate, and he was able to establish contacts with the Papacy for the first time in the wake of the Ottonians. Otto I also awarded the counties of Reggio and Modena to Adalbert-Atto. In 977 at the latest, the county of Mantua was added to the domains awarded to Adalbert-Atto.

Adalbert-Atto's son, Tedald, continued the close ties to the Ottonian rulers from 988. In 996, he is listed as dux et marchio (Duke and Margrave) in a document. This title was adopted by all subsequent rulers of the House of Canossa, an inheritance preventing disputes among the three sons of Tedald.

The rise of the family reached its apex under Margrave Boniface III of Tuscany. The three successive Canossa rulers (Adalbert-Atto, Tedald, and Boniface) instituted monasteries for their expansion of rule. The founded monasteries (Brescello, Polirone, Santa Maria di Felonica) were established in places of transport and strategic importance for the administrative consolidation of their large estates. Three family saints (Genesius, Apollonius, and Simeon) were used to stabilize the House of Canossa's power structure and the family sought to exert influence on convents that had been in existence for a long time (Abbey of Nonantola). Transfer of monasteries to local bishops and the promotion of spiritual institutions also enlarged their network of alliances. An appearance as the guardian of order consolidated their position along the Via Aemilia. Historian Arnaldo Tincani was able to prove the considerable number of 120 farms in the Canossa estate near the Po river.

The Attonid ruler of Tuscany was Countess Matilda, who ruled until her death in 1115.

== Sources ==
- Goez, Elke (2012). Mathilde von Canossa (in German). Darmstadt: Primus-Verlag. ISBN 978-3863123468.
- Goez, Elke (2006a). Christoph Stiegemann, Matthias Wemhoff (ed.). Die Canusiner – Machtpolitik einer oberitalienischen Adelsfamilie (in German). Munich: Canossa 1077. Erschütterung der Welt. pp. 117–128.
