= Boniface I of Tuscany =

Italian noble

Margrave of Tuscany
- Reign: 812 – 823
- Successor: Boniface II of Tuscany
- Born: 740; Bavaria
- Died: 823
- Issue: Boniface II; Berard; Richilda
- House: Boniface
- Father: Riccobaldo of Lucca

Boniface I (died 823) also known as Boniface the Bavarian, was sometimes considered as the first Margrave of Tuscany from 812 to 823.

== Biography ==
According to Ludovico Antonio Muratori, although the precise year and place of birth are not known, he was certainly originally from Bavaria and arrived in Italy following Charlemagne. He was nicknamed the Bavarian due to his origins and was the representative of imperial power at the request of Charlemagne. Boniface was then appointed as governor of Italy by Charlemagne after the death of King Pepin. He was the count and duke of Lucca and sometimes is considered the first margrave of Tuscany because of the various counties he amassed: Pisa, Pistoia, Volterra, and Luni. He was first attested in March 812.

He left a son, Boniface, who became margrave of Tuscany and another named Berard, who assisted his brother in the defence of Corsica. His only daughter, Richilda, became abbess of SS. Benedetto e Scolastica in Lucca.

== Sources ==
- Wickham, Chris. Early Medieval Italy: Central Power and Local Society 400-1000. MacMillan Press: 1981.
- Dizionario Biografico degli Italiani.

Italian nobility
New title	Margrave of Tuscany; 812–823	Succeeded by Boniface II
