= Boniface III of Tuscany =

Margrave of Tuscany (c. 985–1052)

- Miniature of Boniface from the early twelfth-century manuscript of Donizo's Vita Mathildis (Codex Vat. Lat. 4922, fol. 28v.).

Margrave of Tuscany
- Reign: c. 1027 – 6 May 1052
- Predecessor: Rainier
- Successor: Frederick
- Born: c. 985; Canossa
- Died: 6 May 1052 (aged 67); Margraviate of Tuscany
- Spouse: Beatrice of Lorraine
- Issue: Frederick of Tuscany; Matilda of Tuscany
- Dynasty: House of Canossa
- Father: Tedald of Canossa
- Mother: Wilma of Bologna
- Religion: Christianity

Boniface III (also Boniface IV or Boniface of Canossa) (c. 985 – 6 May 1052), son of Tedald of Canossa and the father of Matilda of Tuscany, was the most powerful north Italian prince of his age. By inheritance he was count (or lord) of Brescia, Canossa, Ferrara, Florence, Lucca, Mantua, Modena, Pisa, Pistoia, Parma, Reggio, and Verona from 1007 and, by appointment, margrave of Tuscany from 1027 until his assassination in 1052.

== Early life ==
He was the son of the Margrave Tedald and Willa of Bologna. The Lombard family's ancestral castle was Canossa and they had held Modena for several generations. They possessed a great many allodial titles and their power lay chiefly in Emilia.

Boniface was probably associated with his father before the latter's death. In 1004, with the title marchio, he donated land to the abbey of Polirone, and he appears in two documents of the same year as gloriosus marchio. He kept his court at Mantua, which he transformed into a city of culture: "With so many magnificent spectacles and feasts that all posterity and all their contemporaries marvelled thereat."

== Imperial politics ==
In 1014, Boniface aided the Emperor Henry II in putting down Margrave Arduin of Ivrea, who claimed the Kingdom of Italy in opposition to Henry. His father nominated him as heir over his brothers and, in 1016, he was again fighting alongside the emperor, this time against the margrave of Turin, Ulric Manfred II.

In 1020, Boniface defeated a rebellion of his brother Conrad, but the two reconciled and both were later recorded as dukes. In 1027, he supported the candidacy of the Salian Conrad II, Holy Roman Emperor and King of Germany for the thrones of Italy and the Holy Roman Empire against the other claimants: William V of Aquitaine, Robert II of France, or Hugh Magnus. When Boniface's Lombard enemies tried to incite his brother against him, the two offered battle to them at Coviolo, near Reggio, and emerged victorious, though Conrad was killed. When Conrad II finally succeeded in entering Italy, he was met with defiance at Lucca and he deposed the reigning margrave of Tuscany, Rainier, and gave his lands and titles to Boniface. This seems to be the probable scenario, though the exact date of Boniface's assumption of the Tuscan lordship is uncertain. He thereby considerably increased his paternal domains and Boniface rose to be the most powerful person between the middle Po and the northern border of the Patrimonium Petri (Patrimony of Saint Peter). Emperor Conrad II wanted to tie his most powerful vassal in south of the Alps to his inner circle in the long term through a marriage.

Boniface attended the emperor at the city of Nijmegen in 1036 on the occasion of the wedding of Conrad II's son Henry with Gunhilda of Denmark. On that occasion Conrad, his family and his court took up residence in Nijmegen for more than a month. Here Boniface met Beatrice of Lorraine, niece and foster daughter of Empress Gisela of Swabia with whom a marriage covenant could be arranged. According to the agreements, Beatrice brought important assets in Lorraine: the Château of Briey and the Lordships of Stenay, Mouzay, Juvigny, Longlier and Orval, all the northern part of her paternal family's ancestral lands. As the daughter of Duke Frederick II of Upper Lorraine and Matilda of Swabia, she and her sister Sophia were raised in the imperial court by their aunt Empress Gisela (her mother's sister) after the deaths of their parents. For Boniface, the marriage to Beatrice, a close relative of the Emperor, brought him not only prestige but also the prospect to finally have an heir; his first marriage with Richilda (died after February 1036), daughter of Giselbert II, Count Palatine of Bergamo, brought one daughter, born and died in 1014.

Boniface subdued Pavia and Parma, in revolt against the emperor, and the emperor made a treaty with Boniface, an act which has been construed as recognition of Boniface's independence. In 1032, he was at war with the rebel Count Odo II of Blois. In early summer 1036, In 1037, he helped put down a revolt against the Emperor Conrad, and in February 1038, hosted the Emperor, while the latter journeyed to Florence. In 1043, for services rendered the Empire, he received the Duchy of Spoleto and Camerino. He also acquired more land in Parma and Piacenza, and his chief residence in this time was at Mantua.

In 1039, Boniface travelled to Miroalto to aid Henry against the rebellious Odo of Blois. While he was returning, he destroyed the grain fields of the region and the enraged populace retaliated and stole some of his retainers' horses. It was during his blood reprisal that Boniface made his most famous recorded statement. Preparing to hack off the ears and nose of a young man, Boniface was confronted by the youth's mother, who begged him be spared and promised him her son's weigh in silver. Boniface replied to his offer that he "was no merchant, but a soldier," adding: "Absit ut hostes ferro capti redimantur argento". (Far be it that what was captured by steel should be redeemed with silver.)

In 1046, Henry III entered Italy to be crowned emperor. Boniface received the emperor and the empress, Agnes of Poitou, with honour and munificence on their arrival at Piacenza and his governor did so at Mantua on their return journey. The relationship between Boniface and Henry, however, soon deteriorated in 1047.

== Papal intrigue ==
With the death of Pope Clement II, Pope Benedict IX, with the covert support of Boniface, was re-instated, This was a choice not universally approved, and by Christmas 1047, a delegation of Romans met with the emperor to ask him to name a successor. The following month, Henry called a council. Although the Romans wanted Halinard of Lyons, the Bavarian Bishop Poppo of Brixen was chosen, taking the name of Damasus II. On his way to Rome, Damasus met Boniface, who informed him that Benedict had already been chosen by the people; and declined to accompany Damasus. Damasus returned to Henry, who viewed Boniface's support of Benedict a challenge to imperial authority. He ordered Boniface to escort Damasus to Rome. Damasus was consecrated on 17 July 1048, but died less than a month later, at Palestrina, just outside Rome, probably poisoned.

Boniface eventually joined the reform party of Leo IX and was present at the Synod of Pavia in 1049. In his later years, he kept the Abbey of Pomposa well-endowed for the sake of his soul and even confessed to simony and permitted Guido of Pomposa to flagellate him in punishment for it.

== Death ==
Boniface' signature from a document of 1038, preserved in the state archives of Lucca

He tried to restrict the rights of his valvassores, despite Conrad's imperial edict of 1037. It was this action against his undertenants which got him killed in 1052, during a hunting expedition. This version of Boniface's death is disputed. Some have alleged that Henry played a part in his assassination. It is also held by some that in 1044 there was an attempt made on the margrave's life at Brescia and that the conspirators fled to Verona, which Boniface subsequently sacked before expelling some Veronese conspirators from Mantua as well. One Scarpetta Carnevari apparently nursed a grudge for this act and years later, while Boniface was preparing a galley for a pilgrimage to Jerusalem, shot him with a poisoned arrow on the river Oglio, near Martino dall'Argine in the region of Spineta while on the hunt.

== Family ==
Boniface's first marriage (before 1015) was to Richilda, daughter of Giselbert II, Count Palatine of Bergamo. Richilda took little part in Boniface's government and was dead by 1034, leaving no children.

In 1037, he married Beatrice, daughter of Frederick II, Duke of Upper Lorraine and Count of Bar, and niece and adoptive daughter of Empress Gisela, wife of Emperor Conrad II. They celebrated their marriage in high style, keeping court at Marengo for three months afterwards. Boniface and Beatrice had three children, one son, Frederick (named after his maternal grandfather), and two daughters, Beatrice (named after her own mother) and Matilda (named after her maternal grandmother).

The eldest child, Beatrice, died in 1053, shortly after Boniface. The only son, Frederick, succeeded his father, but died soon after. The youngest child was Matilda, who inherited the great patrimony from Frederick. Beatrice was Regent of Tuscany from 1052 until her death in 1076, during the minority of and in co-regency with, Matilda. Beatrice remarried in 1054 to Godfrey III, Duke of Lower Lorraine, who co-ruled as consort until his death in 1069.

== Notes ==
Preceded by Rainier	Margrave of Tuscany; 1027–1052	Succeeded by Frederick
