= Willa of Spoleto =

Margravine of Tuscany
- Predecessor: Willa of Burgundy

Duchess of Spoleto
- Born: c. 900
- Died: 7 January 978
- Spouses: Hubert, Duke of Spoleto
- Issue: Hugh of Tuscany; Waldrada of Tuscany; Bertha?
- Father: Boniface I of Spoleto
- Mother: Waldrada
- Religion: Catholic Church

Willa of Spoleto (also Willa of Tuscany) (c. 900 – 7 January 978) was the daughter of Boniface I, duke of Spoleto. Through marriage to Hubert, Duke of Spoleto Willa became duchess of Spoleto and margravine of Tuscany.

== Family ==
Willa’s parents were Boniface I, duke of Spoleto and Waldrada, daughter of Rudolf I, king of Upper Burgundy. Thus her maternal uncle was Rudolph II of Burgundy, and his daughter Adelaide of Italy was her cousin.

== Marriage and issue ==
Around 945 Willa married Hubert, an illegitimate son of King Hugh and Wandelmoda. Hubert and Willa at least two children:

- Hugh, who succeeded Hubert as margrave of Tuscany;
- Waldrada, who married Pietro IV Candiano, doge of Venice;
- It is sometimes argued that Bertha, who married Margrave Arduin of Ivrea, future king of Italy, was also the daughter of Willa and Hubert.

== Religious patronage ==
According to a diploma issued by Emperor Otto III in 998, Willa was the founder of the convent of San Ponziano in Lucca. Willa was widowed, around 968, and her son Hugh succeeded Hubert as margrave of Tuscany. Willa moved with Hugh from Lucca to Florence, establishing this as the new capital of Tuscany. In 978 Willa founded the monastery of Badia Fiorentina in Florence to commemorate her late husband.

Willa’s date of death is not known.
