= Willa of Burgundy =

Margravine of Tuscany
- Reign: 932 - 936
- Predecessor: Marozia
- Successor: Willa of Spoleto
- Born: c. 900
- Died: after 936
- Spouses: Boso, Margrave of Tuscany
- Issue: Willa of Tuscany; Bertha of Arles; Richilda; Gisela
- House: Elder House of Welf
- Father: Rudolph I of Burgundy
- Mother: Willa of Provence
- Religion: Catholic Church

Willa of Burgundy (c. 900 – after 936) was a member of the Elder House of Welf. By birth she was a daughter of Rudolph I of Burgundy, king of Upper Burgundy. Through marriage to Boso, Margrave of Tuscany, Willa became countess of Avignon and Arles, and then margravine of Tuscany.

== Family ==
Willa’s parents were Rudolph I of Burgundy, king of Upper Burgundy and Willa of Provence, daughter of Boso of Provence. Willa’s siblings included Adelaide, wife of Emperor Louis the Blind, and Rudolph II of Burgundy, who succeeded their father as king of Burgundy. After Willa’s father’s death in 912, her mother married Hugh of Italy.

== Marriage ==
In 912 Willa married Boso, count of Arles and Avignon. Boso was the son of Theobald of Arles and Bertha, a daughter of King Lothair II. His older brother, Hugh of Italy, was married to Willa’s mother. In 926, when Hugh became king of Italy, he made Boso regent of Provence. According to Liutprand of Cremona, at Willa’s and Boso’s urging, in 931 Hugh accused his half-brother Lambert of Tuscany of conspiring against him, and deposed him. Hugh invested his brother Boso as margrave of Tuscany in Lambert’s place, and Willa became margravine of Tuscany. According to Liutprand of Cremona, Willa’s ambition led Boso to rebel against Hugh in 936. Willa was sent into Burgundy, and Hugh replaced Boso as margrave of Tuscany with his own son, Hubert.

Willa’s date of death is not known.

== Children ==
With Boso, Willa had several children, including:

- Willa of Tuscany
- Bertha, who married Boso, count of Burgundy, and Raymond II of Rouergue
- Richilda
- Gisela
