= Milo, Count of Verona =

Milo (Italian: Milone) was the Count (later Margrave) of Verona from 931 until 955. He was a vassal of four successive kings of Italy from 910. Under Berengar I he became a courtier (familiaris) and by 924 head of the bodyguard. By 927 he had expanded his landholdings to have vassals of his own. Under Hugh, he revolted twice but kept his position in Verona. Under Berengar II, he was raised to the rank of margrave (marchio) in 953.

Milo was a son of Manfred, from Mosezzo in the region of Novara. His brother Manfred was the count of Lomello. His given name suggests a kinship with the Widonids, perhaps on his mother's side. He is described in a document of 906 as being "of Frankish origin" (Note: Latin: ex genere Francorum.) and not a Lombard. His wife, Valperga, was also a Frank. All the evidence suggests that he belonged from the beginning to the upper ranks of the nobility.

== Berengar I's vassal ==
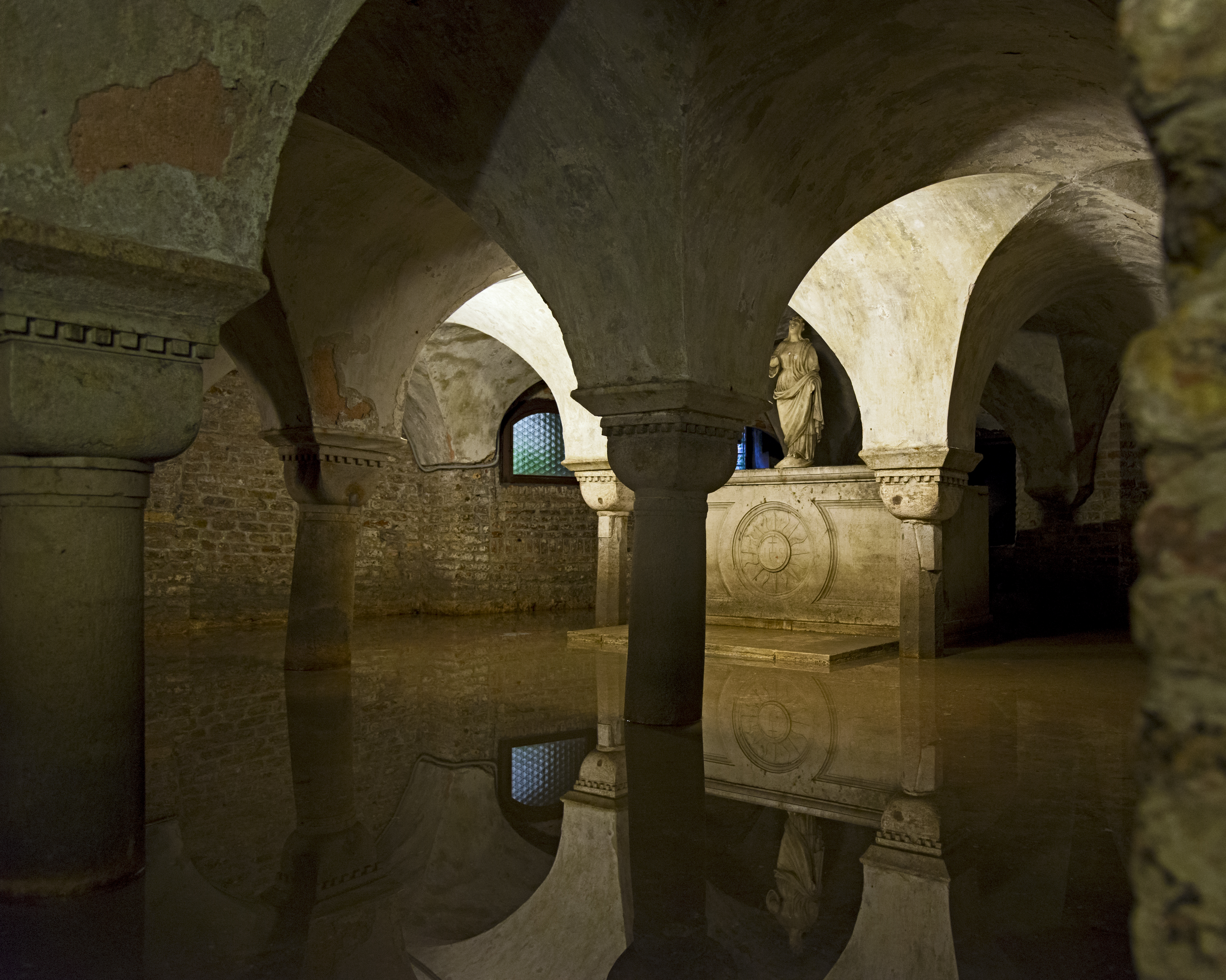
Crypt of San Zaccaria in Venice

Milo's first documentary appearance associates him with the city of Verona and with the aristocratic supporters of King Berengar I. On 1 September 906, he undersigned a donation by the German bishop of Verona, Adalard, to his friend Ingelfred, also a German. It is unclear how Milo came to prominence at Verona—possibly he arrived in the retinue of Ingelfred—but he was to spend the rest of his life based out of the city.

In November 910, Milo was one of ten vassals of the king who acted as a judicial "college" during two placita (public hearings) held at Cremona by Berengar. These placita marked the resumption of public royal justice after it had fallen in abeyance during years of civil war between rivals for the throne. On 1 December 914, Milo witnessed a gift of Ingelfred, who since 906 had become count of Verona, to the nunnery of San Zaccaria in Venice. Milo was to show generosity to the nuns in his will, and it is possible that he had relatives living there. He subscribed Ingelfred's gift with a signum manus as a "lord vassal of the king [from the people] of the Franks". (Note: Latin: vasso domno [ex genere] regis Francorum.)

As a loyal support and vassal, Milo was rewarded by Berengar with a real property after Berengar was crowned Emperor by Pope John X in 915. The diploma recording this royal gift is now lost. Milo was eventually welcomed into the imperial household—the so-called familia—of Berengar as head of the emperor's personal bodyguard. He was holding this position when, on 7 April 924, Berengar was assassinated at Verona. According to Bishop Liutprand of Cremona, a contemporary, Milo had tried in vain to warn the emperor of the conspiracy. Three days after the assassination, he caught the assassin, the steward (sculdascio) Flambert, and hanged him alongside his accomplices.

== Hugh's vassal ==
Milo retained his status as a royal vassal after the coronation of King Hugh in 926. By this time he also had vassals of his own. On 15 November 927, he undersigned the testament of Notker, bishop of Verona, being accompanied as a witness by one of his vassals, as per Lombard law. (Note: Latin: Milo rogatus manu mea subscripsi ... Sigibaldo vasso ut supra Miloni ("I, Milo, upon request, sign with my own hand ... Sigibald, a vassal of the aforementioned Milo").) In this document he signed his name with his own hand and not with, as on all previous occasions, a signum manus. This may indicate that he had learned to write in the preceding decade.

According to Liutprand of Cremona, Milo was one of the noblemen who helped quash a tentative rebellion around 930. Two local judges, Walpert and Everard Gezo, were plotting to assassinate the king in collaboration with some dissident nobles during one of Hugh's visits to the capital, Pavia. The plot became known, and Everard Gezo was captured, his eyes and tongue cut out.

Like his predecessor, Hugh rewarded Milo for his loyalty with grants of public rights, land and offices. By 929, Milo had received from Hugh the right to collect the decima or tithe, an annual tax of a tenth (probably not an ecclesiastical tithe), in the jurisdiction of the villa of Ronco all'Adige. This secured for him a valuable revenue stream that he would hang onto for the rest of his life. Only briefly did he let it go: on 11 July 929, he and Valperga gave the decima of Ronco and the church dedicated to the Virgin that they had founded there to the canons of Verona in accordance with Frankish law. (Note: Latin: Millo vassus regis filius bone recordationis Manfredi una cum Vulperga mea dilecta comite lege Francorum viventes ("Milo, a royal vassal, son of Manfred of good memory, and my beloved companion Valperga, living under the laws of the Franks...")) This was witnessed by four of his vassals. In different circumstances in 931, he took the gift back.

In 930 or 931, Hugh embarked on a major reorganization of the kingdom. He appointed new loyalist counts Modena, Parma, Piacenza and Reggio. He placed his half-brother Lambert at the head of the margravate of Tuscany and his young son Lothair was associated with him as junior king. It is probably around this time that, as part of this effort to strengthen his hold on the kingdom, he appointed Milo count of Verona. Ingelfred was dead by this time; his son, Aitingus (or Egitingus), was displaced.

== Count of Verona ==
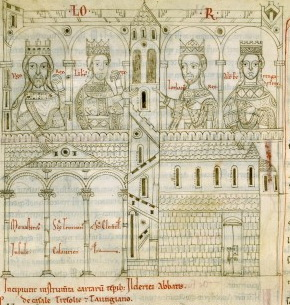
Four kings of Italy From the left: Hugh, Lambert, Lothair II and Berengar II

=== First revolt ===
In June 931, the archbishop of Milan, Lambert, died and was succeeded by Hilduin, bishop of Verona, who was replaced by Rather by August. The election of Rather as bishop of Verona was the supported by Pope John XI and all the leading men of Italy, including Milo, but it was strongly opposed by Hugh. In response, the king took control of the diocese and seized its revenues. This was the first major split between Milo and Hugh. The first certain reference to Milo as count of Verona comes from Liutprand's description of Rather's election in August 931.

By 934 the situation at Verona had become intolerable. Milo and Rather actively recruited Duke Arnulf of Bavaria to come to Italy with an army to install his son, Eberhard, on the throne. According to Liutprand of Cremona, Arnulf and his army were welcomed "gleefully" (libenter) by the count and the bishop and a party of "the most noble men" (honestiores), but were forced to retreat in the face of Hugh's vigorous opposition. In order to salvage something from his defeat, Arnulf intended to take Milo, the instigator of the enterprise, back to Bavaria as a hostage. Getting wind of this plan and in fear of his life, Milo surrendered Hugh. In revenge Arnulf captured Milo's brother Manfred, who had been defending the citadel of Verona against the Bavarian army. By 935 Arnulf and his son had returned to Bavaria.

In the aftermath of the revolt, Milo lost influence at court, but retained his county. His co-conspirator, Rather, was imprisoned at Pavia, then exiled to Como. He was replaced at Verona by Manasses, the king's nephew, who already held the dioceses of Trent and Mantua and controlled the revenues and defences of the newly created "Tridentine march". Rather finally left Italy in 939.

=== Second revolt ===
In 936, Hugh moved to weaken the power and influence of the Anscarids in the margravate of Ivrea in the northwest. He transferred Margrave Anscar II to the duchy of Spoleto in central Italy, and began distributing lands in the county of Parma to rival families. In 941, Milo received one such grant near Parma from Hugh and his son Lothair. It signified his return to royal favour, but also represented a policy of weakening the regional power of the great families.

In the winter of 941–42, Anscar's brother Berengar was exposed as having plotted against Hugh and fled to Swabia in Germany. In early 945, Berengar returned to Italy at the head of a small army, initially taking up residence in Milan. Following the lead of Bishop Guido of Modena, Manasses abandoned Hugh and soon persuaded Milo to do likewise. The latter offered Berengar safety within the walls of Verona. The dissident group began negotiations with Hugh and Lothair. They agreed to recognise them as kings if they accepted Berengar as the "highest councilor of the kingdom". (Note: Latin: summus regni consiliarius.) Hugh opted to go into exile in his native Provence, and Lothair became sole king. From Verona, Berengar and Milo moved on to the capital, Pavia, where on 13 April 945, in Hugh's absence, Berengar was proclaimed "highest councilor" before a solemn assembly in the presence of many counts, including Milo.

Milo appears at his strongest during Berengar's return to Italy, acting almost a kingmaker, although Berengar refrained from deposing Hugh, preferring the claim to be governing on his behalf. Liutprand of Cremona defends Milo for his second rebellion against Hugh. He baldly asserts that Milo was not "unfaithful" (infidelis) to Hugh because his actions were necessary given Hugh's overbearing behaviour. He also describes Milo as a described as a "very powerful count" (praepotens comes).

Shortly after Berengar's assumption of power, Rather returned to Italy. His return to Verona was initially opposed by Milo, and he was imprisoned by Berengar for three and a half months. Manasses, who already held other dioceses and responsibilities, was then shunted aside and Rather was reluctantly welcomed back to Verona by Milo. The count took advantage of the shakeup in the diocese to seize control of its revenues. In his own letters, Rather calls his treatment under Milo a "martyrdom" that lasted two years while the count tried to keep him from exercising his office fully. Posing as the "advocate and protector" (Note: Latin: advocatus et tutor.) of the diocese, Milo prevented Rather from managing ecclesiastical properties, implementing clerical reforms and, most importantly, convoking a diocesan synod. Rather remarked in one letter, "I would rather hunger under Hugh than make merry under Milo". (Note: Latin: mallem ... esurire sub Hugone quam epulari cum Milone.)

It has been hypothesised that Milo was behind the theft of the relics of a local Veronese priest, Saint Metro, housed in the church of San Vitale, by the people of nearby Bolzano Vicentino, in order to deprive Rather of the support of a local saint's cult. Rather himself, however, calls this a "laudable theft" (furtus laudibilis), presumably because it rescued the saint's relics from Milo.

=== Control of the church ===
In 947 Hugh died and his son and co-king, Lothair, became sole ruler. In May 948, Lothair convinced Rather to leave Verona for his personal safety and Bishop Manasses returned. In October, however, Archbishop Arderic died and the archdiocese of Milan fell vacant. Berengar put Manasses forward as a candidate, but he was rejected by the Milanese, who elected one Adalman. Milo, looking to weaken Manasses as bishop of Verona by distracting him elsewhere, lent support to Adalman. For the next five years, Manasses was preoccupied with the conflict over Milan.

Milo took advantage of the Milanese quarrel to negotiate his own economic control of the diocese of Verona. With the consent of Pope Agapetus II, he had his young nephew Milo, son of the count of Lomello, made bishop of Verona. He received from Agapetus the necessary dispensation on account of his nephew's youth and Milo became bishop in 950 or 951. He was bishop for the rest of his uncle's life, although he was removed when Otto I of Germany seized Italy in 961 and reinstalled Rather.

== Margrave ==
After Lothair's death in 950, Berengar took the throne. His mistreatment of Lothair's widow, Adelaide, whom he tried to marry, incited German intervention. In 951, Otto I invaded Italy, married Adelaide himself and subjected the marches of Verona, Istria and Friuli to the Duchy of Bavaria under Duke Henry I. It is unclear whether this large Italian march was detached from Italy and annexed to Bavaria or was merely placed under Bavarian oversight. In neither case did it cause any loss of freedom of action for Milo.

In September 953, Milo used the title "margrave" for the first time in a description of boundaries. He probably received the title from Berengar II as a reward for his loyalty. It may also have been part of Berengar's effort to reconstitute the old margravate of Friuli as a bulwark against the Magyars and Slavs. At the same time, Milo's nephew Egelric, brother of the bishop, was raised to the rank of count.

At Ronco all'Adige on 10 July 955, Milo drew up his will. It is his last known act and he probably died shortly after, although it is unknown when, where or how. At the time he possessed lands in Verona, including a church dedicated to Saint Paul, and three strategically placed castles at Ronco all'Adige, San Bonifacio and Begosso. His will refers to earlier "written letters of instruction" (paginae preceptoriae), probably charters recording grants of land from the king. These may have been in the area of Parma and given between 936 and 945, when Hugh was distributing public lands there to counter the rise of the Anscarids.

Acting as a Frank and in accordance with the Salic law, Milo named as heirs to his lands his brother Manfred and nephew Egelric. He provided an annuity for the convent of San Zaccaria in Venice from the revenues of Ronco all'Adige, and specified that if Manfred and Egelric failed to produce heirs then all his lands should devolve to the convent. This generosity with a Venetian house suggests an otherwise unknown connexion. Perhaps a female relative was a nun there.

Egelric succeeded Milo as count of Verona. He was deposed by Otto in 961, reverting to a mere royal vassal. Milo's family subsequently became known as "da San Bonifacio" (later Sambonifacio) after his castle.

Milo's career has been compared to that of Gandulf of Piacenza, since both rose through the ranks from royal vassal to count to margrave.

== Sources ==
- Bougard, François (2010). "Milone". Dizionario Biografico degli Italiani. Vol. 74. Rome: Istituto dell'Enciclopedia Italiana.
- Hlawitschka, Eduard (1960). "CXX. Milo". Franken, Alemannen, Bayern und Burgunder in Oberitalien, 774–962: Zum Verständnis der fränkischen Königsherrschaft in Italien. Freiburg.
- Sergi, Giuseppe (1999). "The Kingdom of Italy". In Timothy Reuter (ed.). The New Cambridge Medieval History. Vol. 3. Cambridge University Press. pp. 346–71.
- Wickham, Chris (1981). Early Medieval Italy: Central Power and Local Society, 400–1000. London: Macmillan.
- Wolfram, Herwig (1999). "Bavaria in the Tenth and Eleventh Centuries". In Timothy Reuter (ed.). The New Cambridge Medieval History. Vol. 3. Cambridge University Press. pp. 293–309.
