= Ermengarde of Tuscany =

10th-century Countess of Ivrea

Ermengarde

Countess of Ivrea
- Reign: c. 915-c. 929
- Born: c. 901
- Died: 29 February 931/2
- Spouses: Adalbert I of Ivrea
- Issue: Anscar of Spoleto
- Father: Adalbert II of Tuscany
- Mother: Bertha of Lotharingia
- Religion: Catholic Church

Ermengarde of Tuscany (also Ermengarda; Hermengarda) (c. 901-931/2) was a medieval Italian noblewoman. She was the daughter of Bertha of Lotharingia and Adalbert II, Margrave of Tuscany. She was countess of Ivrea through marriage to Adalbert I of Ivrea. Alongside her half-brother Hugh of Italy Ermengarde was an important opponent of Rudolf II of Burgundy’s rule in Italy.

== Family ==
Ermengarde was born in 901. Her father was Adalbert II of Tuscany and her mother was, Bertha of Lotharingia. Through Bertha, who was an illegitimate daughter of Lothair II, king of Lotharingia, Ermengarde was connected with the Carolingian dynasty. Ermengarde had two brothers, Guy of Tuscany and Lambert of Tuscany. She also had four half-siblings from her mother’s first marriage to Theobald of Arles: Hugh, king of Italy, Boso of Tuscany, Theutberga of Arles, and another sister, whose name is not known.

== Marriage and issue ==
Ermengarde married Adalbert I of Ivrea, from the Anscarid dynasty around 914/5. With Adalbert I, Ermengarde had a son, Anscar of Spoleto. Ermengarde had a great influence on her husband, and often appeared in his diplomas entitled ‘most noble countess’ (noblissima comitissa). Ermengarde also intervened in the diplomas of other rulers, including a diploma issued by Rudolf II of Burgundy in 924, granting Castel vecchio d'Asti to Autbert of Asti, and a diploma issued by her half-brother, Hugh, in Pavia in 926.

== Opposition to Rudolf II ==
The tenth-century Italian chronicler, Liutprand of Cremona indicates that after the death of her husband, Ermengarde “obtained primacy in all Italy”. Liutprand, who wrote disparagingly about many powerful Italian women, argued that the source of Ermengarde’s power was her sexuality: “she exercised carnal transactions with one and all, not just princes but even with ordinary men”. Although her husband Adalbert had supported crowning Rudolph II of Burgundy as king of Italy in opposition to Berengar I of Italy, Ermengarde did not. She “quite manfully kept the king (Rudolf) out of the very capital of the kingdom, Pavia”.
