= Anscar of Spoleto =

10th-century Italian magnate

Anscar (Italian Anscario; died 940) was a magnate in the Kingdom of Italy who served as Count of Pavia (c. 924–29), Margrave of Ivrea (929–36) and Duke of Spoleto (936–40). He is sometimes numbered "Anscar II" to distinguish him from his grandfather, Anscar I of Ivrea. Described by Liutprand of Cremona as courageous and impulsive, he died in the battle of Spoleto.

== Family ==
Anscar was a member of the Anscarid dynasty, a younger son of Margrave Adalbert I of Ivrea by his second wife, Ermengarde of Tuscany, a daughter of Adalbert II of Tuscany by his second wife, Bertha. He was a nephew of King Hugh in two ways. He was married to Willa, daughter of Margrave Boso of Tuscany, Hugh's brother, and thus Hugh's nephew by marriage. His maternal grandmother was also Hugh's mother. According to Valerie Eads, he was born around 915, a date at odds with Margherita Bertolini.

There is no reliable record of Anscar fathering any children. He is most likely the father of one Amadeus of Mosezzo. According to the speculations of some, he is the likely father of the counts of Pombia, Amadeus and Dado, which would make him, by the latter, the grandfather of King Arduin of Italy.

== Count of Pavia ==
Anscar was probably the count of Pavia—the historical capital of Italy—during his father's lifetime. Like the rest of his family, he supported the claim of Rudolf II of Burgundy to the Italian throne in opposition to Berengar I, and supported Rudolf's invasion in 922. A document of 18 August 924, issued at Pavia, Anscar is a "beloved follower" (dilectus fidelis) of Rudolf and an "illustrious count" (inluster comes), probably of Pavia itself. This charter was issued to the church of San Giovanni Domnarum di Pavia, which had been ruined by the invading Magyars. On 5 December at Pavia, Anscar and his elder half-brother, Berengar interceded with Rudolf on behalf of Oberto, the viscount of Asti. In this charter Anscar also bears the Latin title comes (count). At the brothers' request, Rudolf granted the old castle of Asti and some other properties there to Oberto.

== Margrave of Ivrea ==
At his father's death in 929, Anscar acceded to the march of Ivrea. He and his family abandoned Rudolf in favour of Hugh, who allowed Anscar to keep Ivrea. Hugh probably took the initiative in cultivating ties between him and the Anscarids by marrying his niece, Willa, to Anscar around 931. Hugh may even have expanded the territory of Ivrea in 933–34 by adding the area between the Ticino and Adda rivers, taken from the march of Lombardy. In May 933 Anscar purchased the castle of None in the region of Asti, calling himself "its margrave" (ipsius marchionis). In June 936 he purchased the old castle that had belonged to Oberto from the viscount's son, Guido, then a cleric of the church of Milan. Among his responsibilities as margrave would have been the defence of the region against Magyar incursions from the east and Saracen incursions from the west.

It is possible that Anscar took part in Hugh's assembly of bishops and laymen that met at Verona on 12 February 928 to reorganise the dioceses affected by the Magyar invasions. He was certainly present in Pavia, along with the king and his heir, Lothair, on 15 September 935 at a placitum held by the count of the palace Sarlio to recognise the new possessions of the diocese of Parma, including some at Loculo in Tuscany that once belonged to Anscar's grandfather Adalbert.

== Duke of Spoleto ==
After the death of Duke Theobald I of Spoleto, a nephew (nepos) of the king, on 15 February 936, Hugh removed Anscar from Ivrea in favour of his half-brother and re-posted him to Spoleto. This move, coming at the same time the Hugh removed his brother Boso from the march of Tuscany, may have been spurred by the king's poor relations with Alberic of Rome, whom he accused of conspiring with Boso. By installing his own son, Hubert, in Tuscany and Anscar in Spoleto, Hugh could contain Alberic. A different, but contemporary, interpretation from Bishop Liutprand of Cremona, considers Anscar's transfer a sign of royal disfavour with the Anscarid family, since Anscar would be far removed from his own properties in Spoleto.

In 939, Hugh began occupying the former Exarchate of Ravenna, which had been under Roman control. Since the Spoletan dukes were traditionally autonomist, it is not unlikely that this move that brought the domain of royal control closer both to Anscar and to Alberic drove the two into an alliance. Whatever the case, by the spring of 940 Hugh had turned against Anscar. According to Liutprand, he gave money to Sarlio to raise opposition to Anscar. With the support of the widow of the previous duke, Sarlio obtained information and followers in Spoleto. At a date unspecified, Sarlio raised a revolt against Anscar, who left the city of Spoleto to engage him. Outnumbered, his troops were defeated at the battle of Spoleto and Anscar killed while leading them in the second attack. Sarlio was put in charge of the duchy of Spoleto.

== Sources ==
- Bertolini, Margherita Giuliana (1961). "Anscario". Dizionario Biografico degli Italiani. Vol. 3. Rome: Istituto dell'Enciclopedia Italiana.
- Eads, Valerie (2010). "Spoleto, battle of". In Rogers, Clifford (ed.). The Oxford Encyclopaedia of Medieval Warfare and Military Technology. Vol. 1. Oxford: Oxford University Press. p. 306.
- Sergi, Giuseppe (1999). "The Kingdom of Italy". In Reuter, Timothy (ed.). The New Cambridge Medieval History: Volume 3, c.900–c.1024. Cambridge: Cambridge University Press. pp. 346–71.
- Wickham, Chris (1981). Early Medieval Italy: Central Power and Local Society, 400–1000. London: Macmillan.

Preceded by Theobald I	Duke of Spoleto; 936–940	Succeeded by Sarlio
