= Hubert of Tuscany =

Frankish noble

Hubert (or Humbert, Italian Uberto or Umberto; died c. 969) was the illegitimate son of King Hugh of Italy and his concubine Wandelmoda. He became Margrave of Tuscany in 936 and Duke of Spoleto and Margrave of Camerino in 943.

Hubert had one full brother named Boso, who became a bishop. Hubert was made Margrave of Tuscany by his father in 936, after the deposition of his uncle Boso. In 942 he was made a count palatine. In 943 Sarlio, duke of Spoleto, was removed from office for killing the previous duke, Anscar, in battle during a quarrel that was possibly orchestrated by the king, who promptly placed his bastard son in the ducal office vacated by Sarlio.

After his fellow margrave, Berengar of Ivrea, became king in 950, Hubert was deprived of Spoleto, but allowed to keep Tuscany. He was the most powerful vassal in central Italy, and remained loyal to Berengar when Otto I of Germany crossed the Alps and took over the kingdom. After Berengar's final defeat, Hubert was reconciled to Otto and allowed, once again, to keep Tuscany.

Hubert married Willa, daughter of Duke Boniface I of Spoleto and Waldrada, daughter of King Rudolf I of Burgundy. Hubert and Willa had a son and three daughters: Hugh, who succeeded him as margrave of Tuscany; Waldrada, who married Pietro IV Candiano, doge of Venice; Bertha, who married Margrave Arduin of Ivrea, future king of Italy; and Willa, who married Count Tedald of Canossa. She was the founder of the church of the Badia Fiorentina at Florence.

== Sources ==
- Previté Orton, C. W. (1917). "Italy and Provence, 900–950". The English Historical Review. 32 (127): 335–47. doi:10.1093/ehr/xxxii.cxxvii.335.
- Previté Orton, C. W. (1922). "Italy in the Tenth Century". In Whitney, J. P.; Tanner, J. R.; Gwatkin, H. W.; et al. (eds.). The Cambridge Medieval History, Volume 3: Germany and the Western Empire. Cambridge: Cambridge University Press. pp. 148–87.
- Wickham, Chris (1981). Early Medieval Italy: Central Power and Local Society, 400–1000. London: Macmillan.
- Wickham, Chris (1988). The Mountains and the City: The Tuscan Appennines in the Early Middle Ages. Oxford: Clarendon Press.

Italian nobility
Preceded by Boso	Margrave of Tuscany; 936–c.969	Succeeded by Hugh
Preceded by Sarlione	Duke of Spoleto; 943–946	Succeeded by Boniface II
Preceded by Sarlione	Margrave of Camerino; 943–946	Succeeded by Boniface II
