= Sarlio of Spoleto =

Sarlio (Note: In Liutprand he is referred to as Sarlionem (>Sarlio), Serlione (>Serlio) and Serlius. In the Chronicon Farfense his name is give as Sarilo. In Italian his name is sometimes given as Sarlione.'"`UNIQ--ref-00000000-QINU`"') was the Duke of Spoleto from 940 until 943. He was originally from Provence and served as a count of the palace under King Hugh.

According to Liutprand of Cremona, the king gave money to Sarlio to raise opposition to Duke Anscar of Spoleto. Sarlio married the widow of the previous duke, Theobald I, a nephew (nepos) of Hugh's, and obtained information and followers in Spoleto. At a date unspecified, Sarlio raised a revolt against Anscar, who left the city of Spoleto to engage him in the battle of Spoleto. Although Sarlio did not enter the battle personally, his troops were victorious and Anscar was killed.

In 941 Hugh took several monasteries in the march of Tuscany and the march of Fermo, including the abbey of Farfa, and gave them to Sarlio, who took the title "rector of the Sabina" according to the Chronicon Farfense. In 943, Hugh forced Sarlio to retire to a monastery—accusing him of murdering Anscar—and placed his bastard son Hubert, already ruling Tuscany, in charge of Spoleto.

== Sources ==
- Bertolini, Margherita Giuliana (1961). "Anscario". Dizionario Biografico degli Italiani. Vol. 3. Rome: Istituto dell'Enciclopedia Italiana.
- Colonna, Enza (1996). Le poesie di Liutprando di Cremona: commento tra testo e contesto. Bari: Edipuglia.
- Eads, Valerie (2010). "Spoleto, battle of". In Rogers, Clifford (ed.). The Oxford Encyclopaedia of Medieval Warfare and Military Technology. Vol. 1. Oxford: Oxford University Press.
- Hofmeister, Adolf (1907). "Markgrafen und Markgrafschaften im italienischen Königreich in der Zeit von Karl dem Grossen bis auf Otto den Grossen (774–962)" (PDF). Mitteilungen des Instituts für österreichische Geschichtsforschung (Ergänzungsband 7): 215–435.
- Previté-Orton, C. W. (1922). "Italy in the Tenth Century". In Whitney, J. P.; Tanner, J. R.; Gwatkin, H. W.; et al. (eds.). The Cambridge Medieval History, Volume 3: Germany and the Western Empire. Cambridge: Cambridge University Press. pp. 148–87.
- Sergi, Giuseppe (1999). "The Kingdom of Italy". In Reuter, Timothy (ed.). The New Cambridge Medieval History: Volume 3, c. 900 – c. 1024. Cambridge: Cambridge University Press. pp. 346–71.

Preceded by Anscar	Duke of Spoleto; 940–943	Succeeded by Hubert
