= Rudolph of Burgundy =

Rudolph of Burgundy may refer to:

- Rudolph, Duke of Burgundy (French, Raoul; also referred to as Ralph), Duke of Burgundy from 921 and King of West Francia from 923 to 936
- Rudolph I, King of Burgundy, elected in 888 after the death of Charles the Fat. He died in 912
- Rudolph II, King of Burgundy, son of Rudolph I, and ruled (Upper) Burgundy from 912 to 937; also king of Provence and Italy
- Rudolph III, King of Burgundy, grandson of Rudolph II, ruled 993 - 1032
