= Anscar of Ivrea =

Anscar of Ivrea may refer to:

- Anscar I of Ivrea (died 902), margrave
- Anscar of Spoleto (died 940), duke, also Anscar II of Ivrea
