= Gandulf of Piacenza =

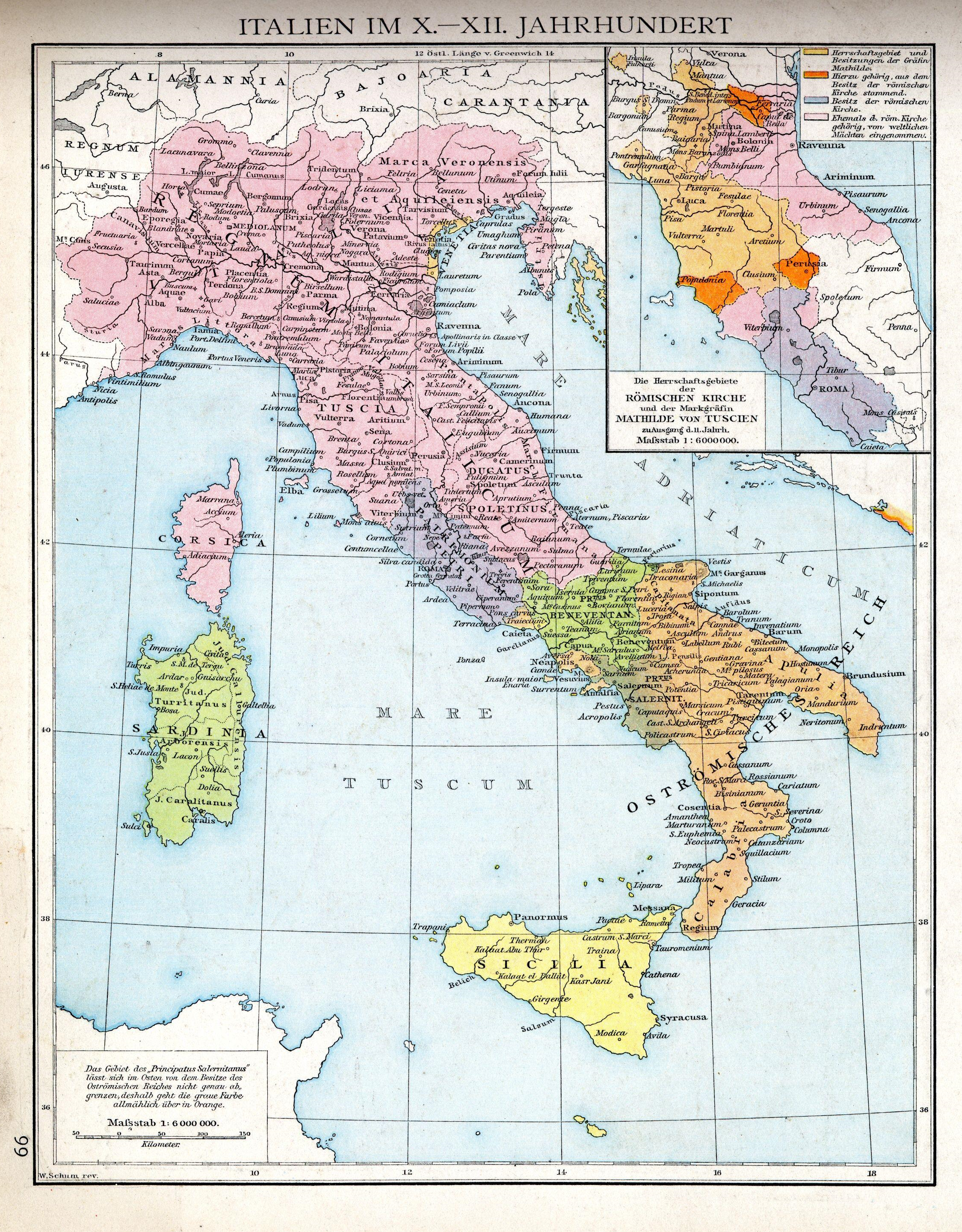
The Kingdom of Italy (pink) in the 10th–12th centuries

Gandulf or Gandolf (Italian: Gandolfo; fl. 907–31) was a Frankish nobleman in the medieval kingdom of Italy. He rose from relatively low rank to become the count of Piacenza and finally a marchio (marquis). He is an ancestor of the Da Palazzo family.

== Family ==
Gandulf was of Frankish origin. His father, Gamenulf, was a gastald in the county of Piacenza in the third quarter of the ninth century, and Gandulf's birth can probably be placed in that period. Gandulf's family was of middle rank and purely local importance. His father's activities cannot be traced outside of the region around Piacenza and are mainly known from judicial documents related to his office. All his known relatives lived in the same region. He may have been related to Gamenulf, bishop of Modena from 898 to 902, and to Gandulf, a gastald in Reggio. The name Gandulf was not common in Italy at the time.

Gandulf's father held land in two areas: in a region called super argele in the immediate vicinity of Piacenza and in the towns of Ziano Piacentino and Rossago in the Oltrepò Pavese. Gandulf, on the other hand, did not start off with land in or around Piacenza. It is possible that his father's lands in that region were inherited by Gandulf's brother Gamenulf, who is known only from a document of 892. Gandulf extended his own landholdings by purchases in the Oltrepò: a curtis in Fabbiano with a mill on the Tidone, some estates in Viadano and Santa Maria della Versa and also the castrum (fortified town) of Vigalone.

== Career ==
Gandulf was one of several low-ranking nobleman, like Milo, Count of Verona, who profited from the wars and anarchy in Italy that followed the deposition of the Emperor Charles the Fat in 887. He had already surpassed his father's rank and influence by the time he first enters the historical record. In the royal capital of Pavia on 2 June 907, he witnessed a concession made by the abbot of Nonantola to one Lambert, a Frankish vassal of Marquis Adalbert I of Ivrea. While his father never learned to write his own name, Gandulf signed himself at the top of the witness list, a clear sign of his prominence on the occasion. Since the charter of concession was dated by the years of King Berengar I, it is significant to historians as the earliest indication that Adalbert of Ivrea had returned to Berengar's allegiance after his support for a rival king, Louis III, in 905.

By December 918, Gandulf was an imperial vassal, directly owing fealty to Berengar, who had been crowned emperor in 915. By this time, he also had his own vassals. In 924, Berengar was assassinated. After a disputed succession, Count Hugh of Arles established himself as king of Italy in July 926. In 927, Milo of Verona foiled a plot by two dissident judges, Walpert and Everard Gezo, to assassinate Hugh during a visit to Pavia. From this point on, with the memory of Berengar's assassination still also fresh, Hugh relied heavily on men of lower rank who had proven their loyalty to Berengar. Gandulf was one who benefited from this policy. These men, who owed their promotion to high rank to the king's favour, were expected, not always correctly, to be loyal out of gratitude.

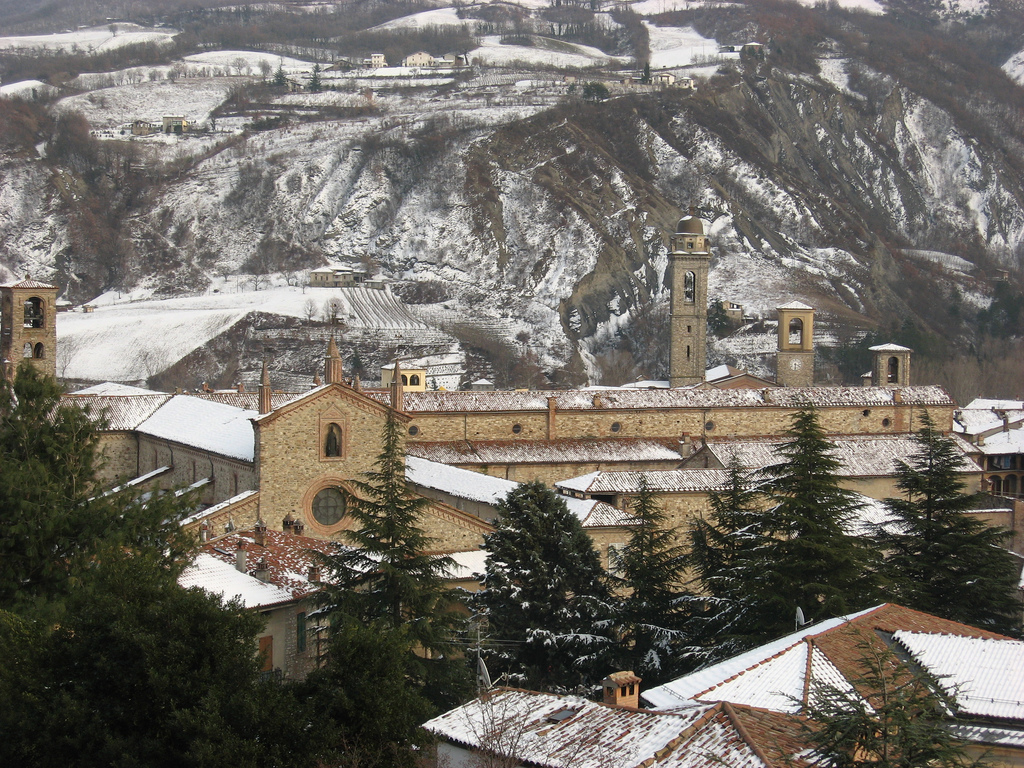
The Abbey of Bobbio

In the summer of 929, the count of Piacenza, Raginer, was injured by a fall from his horse while fleeing Pavia, where he had been summoned on accusations of usurping lands from the abbey of Bobbio. This seems to have been the occasion on which Gandulf was appointed count of Piacenza. Exactly when he replaced Raginer is not recorded, but he was in office by July 930. By April 931, he was promoted to the rank of marquis, but it is unclear if this title came with added military or political responsibilities.

Gandulf was not entirely innocent in the affair of Bobbio. He too had usurped abbey lands in the southwest of the county of Piacenza, at Borgoratto Mormorola, but he returned them before the trial in Pavia, unlike Raginer or Raginer's brother, the bishop Guy. Gandulf probably resided in the castrum of Portalbera, between Piacenza and Pavia, where he could collect the ripaticum (river toll).

== Death and descendants ==
Gandulf disappears from the historical record soon after his rapid rise. There is a complete gap in the historical record of the counts of Piacenza between 931 and 962, when King Otto I appointed Riprand as count. It is unknown when Gandulf ceased to be count, or when he died and where. There may have been a long period during which no count of Piacenza was appointed. Gandulf had at least one son, Boso. Count Riprand is recorded as marrying a relative of Boso, but the exact relationship is unclear. Through Boso, however, the descendants of Riprand became known as the Gandolfingi (later Da Palazzo), after Gandulf. They were later prominent in Verona.

Boso was still living towards the end of the tenth century. His primary residence was the castrum of Nibbiano on the upper Tidone, from which he controlled an extensive lordship in the west of the county of Piacenza. This large estate passed to the Obertenghi in the late 1020s.

== Sources ==
- Bougard, François (1999). "Gandolfo". Dizionario Biografico degli Italiani. Vol. 52. Rome: Istituto dell'Enciclopedia Italiana.
