= Milo of Verona =

Milo of Verona may refer to:

- Milo, Count of Verona (r. 931–955), uncle of the bishop
- Milo (bishop of Verona) (r. 951–961, 968–980), nephew of the count
