= Gotofredo I (archbishop of Milan) =

Gotofredo I (or Gotifredo; died 19 September 979) was the archbishop of Milan from 974 until his death.

Gotofredo first appears as Gotefredus clericus ac notarius ("Gotofredo, cleric and notary") of Archbishop Walpert in July 962, when he was at San Salvatore di Tolla nel Piacento. Gotofredo was later a subdeacon and a supporter of the Ottonians, for whom he acted as a diplomat. On 25 June 965, he was present with Burchard III of Swabia at the Battle of the Po, where Guy of Ivrea was defeated and killed. Guy's younger brother, Conrad Conon, was convinced to leave his family's faction, with the offer of the March of Ivrea, now vacated. Gotofredo, on behalf of Otto I, bestowed it on him in 970.

According to the notice of his death, he had been archbishop for five years, one month, and twenty-three (or twenty-four) days, which, calculated backwards, places the beginning of his tenure in July or August 974, depending on whether it is dated from his election or consecration. His predecessor, Arnulf I, died on 16 April 974. Gotofredo's episcopate was marked by his continued support for the Ottonian dynasty and for German rule of Italy. He died in 979 and was buried in Santa Maria Iemale. He was the last of a series of seven politically active archbishops before a period of quiet descended on the Ambrosian see.
