= Arnulf of Milan (disambiguation) =

Arnulf of Milan (fl. c. 1085) was a medieval chronicler of northern Italy.

Arnulf of Milan may also refer to:

- Arnulf I (archbishop of Milan) (r. 970–974)
- Arnulf II (archbishop of Milan) (r. 998–1018)
- Arnulf III (archbishop of Milan) (r. 1093–1097)
