= Adalbert II of Tuscany =

Margrave of Tuscany, Duke of Lucca (c. 875 – 915)

Adalbert II (c. 875 – 915), called the Rich, son of Adalbert I, Margrave of Tuscany and Rothild of Spoleto.

== Biography ==
He was a grandson of Boniface II, and was concerned with the troubles of Lombardy, at a time when so many princes were contending for the wreckage of the Carolingian Empire. Before his father died in 884 or 886, he is accredited the title of "count". He inherited from his father the titles of Count and Duke of Lucca and Margrave of Tuscany.

Between 895 and 898, he married Bertha (c.863–8 March 925), the daughter of Lothair II of Lotharingia, and widow of Count Theobald of Arles. Adalbert and Bertha had at least three children:

- Guy (d. 3 February 929), who succeeded his father as Count and Duke of Lucca and Margrave of Tuscany.
- Lambert (d. after 938), who succeeded his brother in 929 as Count and Duke of Lucca and Margrave of Tuscany, but lost the titles in 931 to his half-brother Boso of Tuscany.
- Ermengarde (d. 932), who married Adalbert I of Ivrea in 915.

Adalbert II died on 10 or 15 September 915 and was buried in the cathedral of Lucca. His widow Bertha was regent for their young son Guy.

== Sources ==
- Jackman, Donald C. (2008). Ius hereditarium Encountered II: Approaches to Reginlint. Editions Enlaplage.26
- Previté Orton, C. W. (1917). "Italy and Provence, 900-950". The English Historical Review. 32 (127 (Jul)). Oxford University Press: 335–347.
- Reuter, Timothy, ed. (1999). "Appendix: Ruler and Genealogical Tables". The New Cambridge Medieval History: Volume 3, C.900-c.1024. Cambridge University Press.
- Wickham, Chris (1990). Early Medieval Italy: Central Power and Local Society 400-1000. University of Michigan Press. ISBN 0-472-08099-7.

Preceded by Adalbert I	Margrave of Tuscany; 886–915	Succeeded by Guy
