= Manasses of Arles =

Fresco portrait of Manasses as bishop of Trent by Domenico Zeni in the Castello del Buonconsiglio

Manasses (died 17 November 962/963) was a Provençal prelate, a member of the Bosonid dynasty and notorious pluralist who held several dioceses in Provence and Italy simultaneously. He was the archbishop of Arles from at least 920 until his death. He was twice bishop of Verona (931–946, 948–950) and briefly bishop of Mantua (935–937). In 935, he was appointed bishop of Trent and also given responsibility for the defence of the Tridentine march with its major fortress at Formicaria.

In the turbulent Italian politics of the era, Manasses changed allegiance several times, although for most of his career he benefited from his kinship with Kings Hugh and Lothair II. In 945, he supported Berengar II in reducing Hugh to a figurehead. He was rewarded with the archbishopric of Milan in 948, but not without opposition. In 951, he supported King Otto I of Germany in reducing Berengar to a vassal. Berengar forced his resignation from Milan in 952 or 953. Manasses continued to pursue claims to it as late as 960, but by then he no longer had Otto's support.

In Provence, Manasses supported the peaceful accession of Conrad in 948.

== Life ==
=== Provence ===
Manasses was born in the late 9th century, the son of Count Garnier of Troyes and Teutberga. On his mother's side he was of the Bosonid lineage. He owed his rise to his maternal uncle, King Hugh of Italy. The name "Manasses" was probably a biblical refashioning of the name Maginerius, otherwise attested in his father's family.

While he was still marquis of Provence, Hugh engineered Manasses' election to succeed Archbishop Rostang of Arles. The first record of Manasses as archbishop is a charter of 25 December 920, when he witnessed an exchange of properties between Hugh and the Abbey of Saint-André-le-Bas. In February 921, King Louis III of Provence confirmed the archdiocese's possession of the incomes of the abbeys of Aniane, Cruas and Goudargues and of various rights in Arles (ripaticum, teloneum, mintage and protection of the Jews).

=== Italy ===
==== Bishop of Verona, Trent and Mantua ====
Sometime after Hugh became king of Italy (926), Manasses followed him there. In 931, according to Rather of Verona, Hugh sought to appoint his nephew to the vacant diocese of Verona against canon law, but was forced under pressure from Pope John XI to accept the appointment of Rather. In 935, amidst a general crisis, Hugh tried again, appointing Manasses to not only Verona, but Trent and Mantua also. He also placed him in charge of the march of Trent to defend Italy against the invasion of Duke Arnulf of Bavaria. In the eyes of Liudprand of Cremona, "he ceased to be a bishop when he began to be a soldier". Liudprand attributes to Manasses a defence of his conduct based on the apocryphal Acts of Mark, in which Saints Peter and Mark are both depicted moving from one see to another.

Liudprand's use of the phrase in escam ("as sustenance") may indicate that Manasses did not exercise full episcopal rights over Verona, Trent and Mantua but only controled their resources. He is listed, however, in the episcopal list for Trent between bishops Bernard (fl. 927–932) and Lantramn (fl. 957–963). In Verona, he named a cleric from Arles as his successor in 946 to spite Rather. In Mantua, a bishop named Peter was in office by 937.

Liudprand records that when Berengar of Ivrea returned from exile to Italy in 945, "knowing Manasses's ambition and vainglory all too well", he bribed him for his support by swearing an oath to make him archbishop of Milan once he had attained the throne. According to Liudprand, Manasses ordered Adelard, the cleric commanding the castle of Formicaria, to turn it over to Berengar. He also encouraged all of Italy to go over to Berengar and was soon joined by Count Milo of Verona. Manasses may have felt slighted by Hugh if he had expected to succeed Arderic as archbishop of Milan in 936.

In the settlement reached between Berengar and Hugh, by which Hugh nominally kept his throne and his son Lothair II was elected king, Manasses was recognized as summus regni consiliarius (supreme counsellor of the kingdom). When Rather returned from exile, Berengar had him arrested—"on the prompting of Manasses", in his own words. He sarcastically calls Manasses a "most holy archbishop, one who would justly hold the place of Ambrose". He was released after three months and sought the protection of Milo in Verona. He claims that Milo was acting against Manasses because the latter might help Hugh "in penitence" for his prior betrayal.

==== Archbishop of Milan ====
Manasses maintained his position at the court of his cousin Lothair after the death of Hugh in April 948. In May 948, he had Lothair II restore to him the diocese of Verona and force Rather into exile. In October 948, the death of Arderic opened up the see of Milan again, but the election to succeed him was disputed, one faction electing Manasses and another Adelmann. According to Arnulf of Milan, the election was settled "not in the cathedral but in bow and quiver". Lothair II, who supported his cousin, granted the archbishop of Milan the right to mint coin.

In 948, Manasses returned to Arles, of which he was still archbishop, to make a donation of a part of his inheritance to the Abbey of Cluny. This was probably also the occasion for dealing with the succession to Provence, where Hugh had retired in 947. Manasses and his brother, Count Hugh, recognized Conrad the Peaceful, king of Transjurane Burgundy, as king in Provence. In May 950, as the king's cousin and counsellor, Manasses was back in Italy to intervene with Lothair on behalf of the diocese of Como. The death of Lothair in November weakened his position. Berengar took the throne and appointed Milo's nephew, also Milo, to the see of Verona. Rather claims that Manasses "sold" the diocese to Milo.

In 951, Manasses turned against Berengar, who had him deposed. When King Otto I of Germany, who had married Lothair's widow Adelaide, invaded Italy in the fall of 951, Manasses supported him. By 10 October, Otto had named Manasses archchaplain. By February 952, he had named him archchancellor. Manasses was also restored to Milan. He attended the Synod of Augsburg (952) and was present when Otto, Berengar and Berengar's son Adalbert settled the status of Italy. Berengar and Adalbert were to remain kings under the suzerainty of Otto.

=== Loss of Milan ===
In late 952 or early 953, a new election was held to resolve the schism in Milan. Walpert was elected. According to Arnulf of Milan, Manasses and Adelmann were forced to resign.

Manasses was back in Provence by December 954. He returned to Italy in March 959, but the circumstances are unclear. He still claimed Milan and may have agreed to a partition of territory with Walpert, or he may have been recalled by Berengar who was at odds with Walpert after 956. In January 957, Walpert went into exile. In December 960, papal envoys were complaining to Otto about Manasses' behaviour. When Otto I deposed Berengar and Adalbert in Ocobter 961, Walpert was restored.

Manasses' last recorded act is dated November 961 in Provence. He died on 17 November 962 or 963.

== Bibliography ==
- Ambrosi, Francesco (1879). "Il medio evo trentino". Archivio Storico Italiano, Serie Quarta. 3 (111): 413–435. JSTOR 44455244.
- Bougard, François (2007). "Manasse". Dizionario Biografico degli Italiani (in Italian). Vol. 68: Malatacca–Mangelli. Rome: Istituto dell'Enciclopedia Italiana. ISBN 978-88-12-00032-6.
- Leyser, Conrad (2010). "Episcopal Office in the Italy of Liudprand of Cremona, c.890–c.970". The English Historical Review. 125 (515): 795–817. doi:10.1093/ehr/ceq160.
- Previté-Orton, C. W. (1912). The Early History of the House of Savoy (1000–1233). Cambridge University Press.
- Previté-Orton, C. W. (1917). "Italy and Provence, 900–950". The English Historical Review. 32 (127): 335–347. doi:10.1093/ehr/xxxii.cxxvii.335. JSTOR 551042.
- Reid, Peter L. D., ed. (1991). The Complete Works of Rather of Verona. Center for Medieval and Early Renaissance Studies.
- Squatriti, Paolo, ed. (2007). The Complete Works of Liudprand of Cremona. Catholic University of America Press.
