= Battle of Fiorenzuola =

Battle between allied Burgundy and Ivrea against Italy in 923 AD

Date	29 July 923
Location	Fiorenzuola, Kingdom of Italy
Result	Burgundian victory

Belligerents
Kingdom of Burgundy; March of Ivrea	Kingdom of Italy

Commanders and leaders
Rudolph II of Burgundy; Adalbert I of Ivrea	Berengar I of Italy

Casualties and losses
Unknown	1,500 killed

The Battle of Fiorenzuola was fought on 29 July 923 between the forces of Rudolph II of Burgundy and Adalbert I of Ivrea on one side and Berengar I of Italy on the other. The battle was a defeat for Berengar, who was thus de facto dethroned and replaced by Rudolf as King of Italy. His own grandson and namesake, Berengar II, who would later be king of Italy as well, fought on the winning side against him.

== Background ==
Berengar was supported principally by the German faction in Italy. He was defeated by Guido of Spoleto in 889. He re-emerged as sole king in Italy in 898 after the death of Lambert of Spoleto. Louis of Provence was elected as king of Italy in 900, with support particularly from Anscar I of Ivrea. Berengar defeated Louis twice, the second time conclusively in 905 when he had his rival blinded. He was crowned Emperor at Rome in 916.

== Prelude ==
He allied himself with the Magyars to defeat King Rudolph II of Burgundy, who emerged as another rival candidate for the Italian throne, but was later forced back to Verona by Rudolph. The two armies met at Firenzuola.

== Battle ==
Both armies were led by the kings in person. Berengar defeated Rudolph's initial force but failed to control his men, who set out to plunder the spoils. Rudolph's retreat may have been pre-planned. A second group under the future Duke Boniface of Spoleto and Count Gariard of Novara attacked Berengar's scattered troops. Rudolph's soldiers regrouped and rejoined the struggle. Berengar's army collapsed and he fled to his fortress in Verona.

== Aftermath ==
Berengar was assassinated on 7 April 924 in Verona, possibly by Rudolph's men. Rudolph never received the Imperial throne and was forced out from Italy in 926.

=== Casualties ===
Flodoard wrote that 1,500 troops were killed on the Italian side.
