= Arnulf I =

Arnulf I may refer to:

- Arnulf I, Count of Flanders (r. 918–964)
- Arnulf I (archbishop of Milan) (r. 970–974)
