= Giselbert =

Giselbert is the name of:

- Gilbert, Duke of Lorraine (c. 890 – 939), also known as Giselbert
- Giselbert I of Roussillon (d. 1013 or 1014)
- Giselbert II of Roussillon (d. 1102)
- Giselbert, Count of Clermont (d. after 1097)
- Giselbert van Loon (d. c.1045)
- Giselbert of Luxembourg (c. 1007 – 14 August 1059)
- Gilbert, Duke of Burgundy (d. 8 April 956), also known as Giselbert
- Giselbert I of Bergamo (d. c.927/929)
- Giselbert II, Count of Duras (d. before 1138)
- Giselbert II of Bergamo (d. between 993 - 1010)
- Gilbert of Roucy (d. c.1000), also known as Giselbert
