= Dado, Count of Pombia =

Dado (or Dadon) (died 980) was the Count of Pombia from 967. The comitatus of Pombia, in what is now Northern Italy, included Novara at the time.

He was possibly the son of Adalbert, Count of Pombia, or possibly of Berengar II or his half-brother Anscar of Spoleto. He was the father of Guibert, Count of Biandrate; Arduin (955-1015), Margrave of Ivrea (990-1015) and King of Italy (1002-1014); and Amadeus, Count of Pombia.

He was married to the granddaughter of Arduin Glaber and was a nephew of King Berengar II.

== Sources ==
- Bertolini, Margherita Giuliana (1961). "Anscario". Dizionario Biografico degli Italiani. Vol. 3. Rome: Istituto dell'Enciclopedia Italiana.
- Chaume, M. Les origines du duché de Bourgogne.
