= Lambert (archbishop of Milan) =

Archbishop of Milan from 921 to 931

Lambert (died 19 June 931) was the archbishop of Milan from his ordination on 5 October 921 until his death. He was related to two prior archbishops: Andrea da Canziano (died 906) and Garimpert, his father and predecessor, who involved him in the administration of the diocese before 921.

Lambert, along with Marquis Adalbert I of Ivrea and Count Giselbert of Bergamo, led a rebellion against King Berengar I in 921, sparking a long civil war over the Italian throne. The rebels gathered an army outside Brescia, but Berengar surprised them and took many prisoners. Berengar's use of Hungarians as troops raised great indignation and the rebels offered the throne to King Rudolf II of Burgundy. Lambert sent troops to the Battle of Firenzuola (29 July 923), where Rudolf established himself on the Italian throne.

When northern Italy was devastated by Hungarian raids in 925, while Rudolf was in Burgundy, Lambert and several other high-profile supporters of Rudolf defected. On their behalf, Lambert offered the crown to Count Hugh of Arles.

When in 926 Duke Burchard II of Swabia invaded Italy in support of Rudolf, Lambert invited him to Milan while secretly arranging his ambush. He even allowed him to hunt deer in his private hunting preserve. Burchard was then attacked and killed by the Pavians on the road from Novara to Ivrea on 29 April 926.

Lambert died on 19 June 931 and was buried in the Basilica Vetus. He was succeeded by Hilduin, the exiled bishop of Liège, a relative and appointee of Hugh.
