= Lanfranc I of Bergamo =

Lanfranc I of Bergamo (c. 895/900–950/954) was a northern Italian nobleman. He was a member of the dynasty known to historians as the Giselbertiners (or Giselbertini).

== Life ==
Lanfranc was the son of Giselbert I of Bergamo and Rotruda of Pavia.

Lanfranc is first documented as a royal vassal (vassus regis) in 935. By 945 he was entitled count (probably of Bergamo) in a diploma issued by Hugh of Italy. Later that year Lanfranc became count palatine of Bergamo through the intervention of Berengar II of Italy.

He died sometime between 950 and 954.

== Marriage and children ==
With his wife, whose name is not known, Lanfranc I had several children, including:

- Giselbert II of Bergamo
- Franca
