= Rotruda of Pavia =

Italian noblewoman

Rotruda (or Roza) of Pavia (died after March 945) was an Italian noblewoman. Rotruda was married to Giselbert I of Bergamo and later became the mistress of Hugh of Italy.

== Life ==
Rotruda was the daughter of the iudex (judge) Walpert of Pavia. She married Giselbert of Bergamo c.895. Together they had a son, Lanfranc I of Bergamo.

Probably after Giselbert I’s death (c.927/929), Rotruda became the mistress of Hugh of Italy, with whom she had a daughter, Rotlinda. Because of her relationship with Hugh, Rotruda is mentioned in Liutprand of Cremona's work Antapodosis.

== Marriage and children ==
With Giselbert, Rotruda had the following children:

- Lanfranc I of Bergamo

With Hugh, Rotruda had the following children:

- Rotlinda (or Rolenda) (930-1001), who married Bernard, count of Pavia
