= Boniface I of Spoleto =

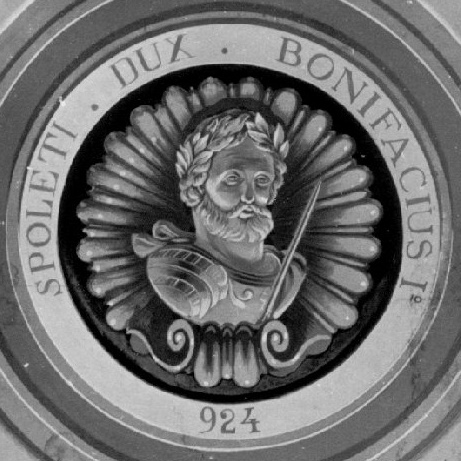
Boniface I of Spoleto

Boniface (Latin: Bonifatius) was count and later duke of Spoleto in the early 10th century. He received the duchy from King Rudolph II of Burgundy after Rudolph secured the kingdom of Italy. Boniface was married to Waldrada, sister of Rudolph, and had two children, Ademar and Villa.

== Rise to power (922–923) ==
In 922 Rudolph II of Burgundy entered Italy to contest the kingship against Berengar. During a battle near Firenzuola by Borgo San Donnino, Boniface, who was Rudolph's brother-in-law, attacked Berengar's pursuing forces, who had already defeated Rudolph's army, allowing the fleeing troops to regroup and return to combat, leading to Berengar's defeat.

After securing the kingdom of Italy, Rudolph II granted Boniface the duchy of Spoleto. Boniface's wife Waldrada, sister of the king, was described by Liutprand of Cremona as distinguished for beauty. Their children were Ademar and Villa, the latter later becoming duchess of Tuscany.

It is considered that Boniface received the duchy around 923, shortly after Rudolph's establishment as king.

== Dukedom ==
Boniface held the duchy of Spoleto until his death, which occurred between 928 and 929.

After his death, King Hugh, who had succeeded Rudolph, appointed his own nephew Theobald to the duchy of Spoleto.

Italian nobility
Preceded by Alberic I	Duke of Spoleto; 923–929	Succeeded by Theobald
