= Lothair of Italy =

Lothair of Italy may refer to:

- Lothair I (d. 855), emperor and king
- Lothair II of Italy (d. 950), king
