= County of Piacenza =

County of the Frankish kingdom of Italy

The County of Piacenza was a county (Latin comitatus) of the Frankish kingdom of Italy. Its centre was the ancient and walled city of Piacenza (Latin Placentia) at the confluence of the Trebbia and the Po, just downriver from the royal capital of Pavia. Much of the county was dominated by the Apennine Mountains. It roughly corresponds to the modern province of Piacenza.

The Franks conquered the kingdom of the Lombards in Italy in 774. The first Frankish king, Charlemagne, established counties in Italy on the Frankish model. The first recorded count of Piacenza, and the only known from Charlemagne's reign, was named Aroinus or Arowinus.

On 3 June 870, the Emperor Louis II granted his queen, Engelberga, the monastery of San Pietro in the county of Piacenza along with seven manors to support the convent of San Sisto she had recently founded within the walls of Piacenza. In 874, Louis extended granted her control of the aqueduct system in the county, as well as the right to certain building materials and to a canal.

The old and wealthy abbey of Bobbio lay within the county of Piacenza, and its abbots were in frequent conflict with the counts. In 929, a great trial was held in Pavia of several Piacentine noblemen accused of usurping Bobbio's lands. The count, Raginer and his brother the bishop, Guy, were among them, as was the future count, Gandulf.

In 997, the Emperor Otto III removed the city of Piacenza itself to a distance of one mile outside its wall from the jurisdiction of the county and placed it under the civil authority of the bishop of Piacenza, at the time Siegfried. Around 1000, the most extensive landholder in the county was Gandulf's son Boso, who held eighteen estates, most of them with castles, in the west of the county, from the Apennines to the Po. His headquarters was at Nibbiano.

By 1065, the bishop of Piacenza, a local nobleman named Denis, had become count. During the controversy over investiture and the papal reforms, he supported the Emperor Henry IV against Pope Gregory VII, who had the support of Piacenza's local pataria. In 1075, Gregory deposed Denis. The last reference to a count of Piacenza is from 1078. By 1095 at the latest, an autonomous commune had been established with papal support and in alliance with Milan.

== List of counts ==
The dates given are those for which the counts are known and are not necessarily the start and end of a countship. Such exact dates are often unknown. The numbering of counts often reflects a family numbering, that is, it indicates not their number among the counts of Piacenza of the same name, but rather their number among their aristocratic family members of the same name.

- Aroinus (799)
- Amandus (before 832)
- Wifred I (843–870)
- Rambert (before 872, possibly before 843)
- Richard (876–879)
- Adalgis II (880–890)
- Ildeger (890)
- Sigefred (892–904)
- Wifred II (911–922)
- Raginer (929)
- Gandulf (930–931), also marquis
- Riprand I (962–976)
- Lanfranc I (999–1009)
- Hugh (1012?–1017?)
- Lanfranc II (1017–1021)
- Adalbert I (1028–1033)
- Adalbert II (1049)
- Riprand II (1049)
- Rainald (1055)
- Denis (1065–1075), also bishop
- Wifred III (1078)

== See also ==
- Timeline of Piacenza
