= Lothair II (disambiguation) =

Lothair II (German: Lothar; French: Lothaire; Italian: Lotario) may refer to:

- Lothair II of Lotharingia, who was the second Lothair to rule from Aachen
- Lothair II of Italy, who was the second Lothair to rule Italy
- Lothair II, Holy Roman Emperor, who was the second Emperor Lothair
- Lothair II of France, who was the second Lothair to rule from West Francia
