= Battle of Spoleto =

Battle in Italy in 940

The Battle of Spoleto took place in 940 between the forces of the count of the palace Sarlio and those of Duke Anscar of Spoleto. Sarlio had been paid by King Hugh to cause unrest in Spoleto, to give cause for the removal of Anscar. Liutprand of Cremona is the only source for the battle and he specifies neither the day nor the place.

Perhaps exceeding his instructions, Sarlio moved on an unspecified city, probably Spoleto, with six acies (units, literally "spearheads") of experienced troops. Since Anscar had only one unit (acies) available at the time, his standard-bearer, Wikbert, advised him to remain in the city. He initially took the advice and sent messengers for reinforcements, but a certain Arcod—who is described as a Burgundian, like Sarlio—pressure him into assaulting Sarlio's camp.

The attack was premature. Anscar personally led his acies in a charge, while Sarlio countered with only three of his acies. Sarlio himself led from the rear, watching the battle from across a river, possibly the Tessino or Clitumno. Liutprand describes him as afraid of facing Anscar in battle. When the first charge by the defenders was successful, Sarlio sent a further two acies into battle under Count Hatto, who had once supported Anscar. At this point, Wikbert, mortally wounded, advised Anscar to flee and save his life. Instead, the duke made a second charge against Sarlio's reinforcements. According to Liutprand, he rebuked Hatto for treachery before sending a broken lance through his mouth, killing him. The Burgundian Arcod fled the fighting. Anscar fought with his sword until his horse was too tired to continue: both Anscar and horse fell into a ditch. Pinned beneath his mount, Anscar was killed by "missiles" from a distance.

== Sources ==
- Eads, Valerie (2010). "Spoleto, battle of". In Rogers, Clifford (ed.). The Oxford Encyclopaedia of Medieval Warfare and Military Technology. Vol. 1. Oxford: Oxford University Press. p. 306.
