= Bertha, Queen of Italy =

Queen consort of Italy from 1002 to 1014

Bertha (died after 1014) was the wife of Arduin of Ivrea. She was thus margravine of Ivrea and queen of Italy (1002-1014).

Her parentage is unknown, but she is often said to be identical with Bertha of Milan, who was a member of the Obertenghi dynasty. Other scholars suggest that Bertha may have been the daughter of Hubert of Tuscany or of Amadeus (son of Anscar II)

Bertha intervened in eight of Arduin's royal diplomas, in which she was often called his consors regni (royal consort).

With Arduin, Bertha had three sons:

- Arduin (sometimes called Ardicino)
- Otto
- Guibert.
