= Giselbert I of Bergamo =

Giselbert I of Bergamo (died c.927/929) was a northern Italian nobleman.

== Life ==
Giselbert I's parents are unknown. He is the progenitor of the dynasty known to historians as the Giselbertiners (or Giselbertini).

Giselbert I was originally a vassal of Berengar I of Italy. Yet by 922 he supported Rudolph II of Burgundy, who rewarded him with the position of count of Bergamo (923).

When Rudolf fell from favour, Giselbert I changed allegiances once again. By 926 he was invested as count palatine of Bergamo by the new king, Hugh of Italy.

== Marriage and children ==
Giselbert I married Rotruda of Pavia, daughter of Walpert of Pavia, c.895. Their son was Lanfranc I of Bergamo.
