= Adelmann (archbishop of Milan) =

Scior Carera, an ancient statue repurposed to represent Adelmann

Adelmann (died 956) was the archbishop of Milan from 948 to 953 as the people's bishop in opposition to the bishop imposed by the king.

According to later tradition, he was the cimeliarch of Santa Maria Iemalis, the winter cathedral, before he was elected archbishop. On the death of Archbishop Arderic in 948, King Lothair II, on the advice of Margrave Berengar of Ivrea, appointed Archbishop Manasses of Arles. The people and clergy elected Adelmann in opposition. Much of his support came from the petty nobility and the lower classes.

Nothing is known of Adelmann's background or social class. The tradition that he founded the church of San Giorgio al Palazzo is without foundation. The Menclozzi family claimed him as their ancestor and made him a rich noble, but this was based on a deliberate conflation of their actual origin in the arimannia (soldier class) with the supposed patrimony of Adelmann, the adelmannia.

Little is known of Adelmann's episcopal activities. According to Arnulf of Milan, the disputed election was not contained in the cathedral but was fought "by bow and quiver". As the people's bishop rather than the king's bishop, Adelmann enjoyed wide support in Milan. In 950–951, Manasses returned to Arles. In the winter of 951–952, however, Otto I of Germany stayed in Milan for four months and restored Manasses.

Otto left the kingdom of Italy to Berengar, who imposed a settlement on the dispute. By April 953, both Adelmann and Manasses had stepped down in favour of Walpert. According to the episcopal catalogues: "Adelmann and Manasses divided [the archbishopric] between themselves five years".

Adelmann died in 956, according to both his epitaph (which is a late addition) and the Liber Notitiae Sanctorum Mediolani. An ancient Roman statue of a man in a toga, now known as Scior Carera, reworked to have a tonsured head, is said to represent Adelmann. This identification was current by the 14th century.

== Bibliography ==
- Buccellati, Graziella; Parks, Tim; Snapp, Holly; Ambrosioni, Annamaria (1999). The Iron Crown and Imperial Europe. Mondadori.
- Greenhalgh, Michael (1989). The Survival of Roman Antiquities in the Middle Ages. Duckworth.
- La Rocca, Maria Cristina (2004–2005). "El espacio urbano entre los siglos VI y VIII". Anales de historia antigua, medieval y moderna. 37–38: 49–74.
- Lopez, Robert S. (1955). "Review article". Speculum. 30 (4): 617–625. JSTOR 2849620.
- Violante, Cinzio (1960). "Adelmanno". Dizionario Biografico degli Italiani (in Italian). Vol. 1: Aaron–Albertucci. Rome: Institute of the Italian Encyclopaedia. OCLC 883370.
