= Theobald I of Spoleto =

Theobald I (died 936) was the Duke of Spoleto from 928 to his death.

== Family background ==
Theobald was the son of Boniface I of the Hucpoldings, former duke, and member of the line of the Hucpoldings, a house of Ripuarian Frankish origin that built its fortunes in Italy since the 9th century.

== Dukedom and campaigns ==
Theobald was an unscrupulous prince, even for his age, and his career is one of constantly changing alliances as the political winds of central and southern Italy changed direction.

In 929, Theobald joined Landulf I of Benevento and Guaimar II of Salerno in a series of joint attacks against Byzantine Campania, Apulia, and Calabria. Theobald was detrimental to the others' cooperation and all three were unsuccessful and Guaimar returned to his earlier Greek allegiance.

Theobald also allied with Docibilis II of Gaeta against the Greeks.

Theobald died in 936, and was replaced by Anscar, son of Adalbert of Ivrea.

=== Account in Liutprand of Cremona ===
Theobald is connected to an anecdote reported by his contemporary Liutprand of Cremona. During a campaign in support of Landulf of Benevento against Byzantine forces, Theobald is said to have defeated the Byzantines and to have ordered that captured soldiers be castrated and then sent back to their commander, saying that he believed he was thereby doing something very pleasing to their emperor, knowing how highly eunuchs were valued at the Byzantine court.

Liutprand relates that, when a number of prisoners were about to undergo this treatment, a young woman entered the camp and demanded that her husband be spared, declaring openly that she had a claim over his body as it was. Her blunt statement, made in front of the assembled soldiers and officers, caused laughter, and Theobald granted her request, allowing the man to go free.

Italian nobility
Preceded by Peter	Duke of Spoleto; 928–936	Succeeded by Anscar
