= Adalbert I of Ivrea =

9/10th-century Margrave of Ivrea

Adalbert I (died after 28 February 929) was the margrave of Ivrea, the second of the Anscarid dynasty, from the late 890s until his death. In the intermittent civil war which affected Italy from 888 into the 930s, Adalbert initially strove to remain neutral, but from 901 on he sided sequentially with every claimant to the Italian throne.

He was a son of Margrave Anscar I, originally from Oscheret in Upper Burgundy. He succeeded his father at Ivrea between 896 and 900. He initially refused to take sides after King Louis of Provence invaded Italy in 900, but after Louis's imperial coronation in 901 he recognised his authority. After Louis was defeated by his rival, Berengar I, in 902, Adalbert changed sides. Shortly thereafter, by 903 at the latest, he married Gisela of Friuli, Berengar's daughter, which was possibly the price of his allegiance. Although Adalbert is not recorded as being related to the king in any of Berengar's charters down through 14 August 908 and his marriage is not explicitly referenced before 13 June 910, it must have taken place some fifteen years before he and Gisela's eldest son were granted a county and a missaticum in 918. With Gisela he had two children: Berengar, who succeeded him as margrave, and Bertha, who became abbess of Modena.

Between 913 and 915 Gisela died and Adalbert married Ermengarde of Tuscany (901 – 29 February 931/932), daughter of Margrave Adalbert II of Tuscany. From this marriage he had a second son, Anscar, later Duke of Spoleto. In 916–917 his primary concern was Saracen raids. In 920–921 he joined those noblemen, many of Burgundian origin like him, who supported the candidature of King Rudolf II of Burgundy for the Italian throne. Adalbert, with Lambert, Archbishop of Milan, and Count Gilbert of Bergamo, assembled a force in the mountains outside Brescia with the intention of marching on Verona and capturing Berengar there. When the latter got wind of the plan, he sent a troop of Magyar mercenaries to circle the conspirators and attack them from behind. In the midst of defeat, Adalbert swapped clothing with one of his soldiers and paid his own ransom at a low price. By late 921 Rudolf had entered Italy and been recognised as king in the march of Ivrea and the archdiocese of Milan. Although Adalbert made a few appearances at Rudolf's court in the early days, he never frequented it as often as did his wife and his two sons.

After his relative Hugh ascended the Italian throne, Adalbert appearances in the records are sparse. He apparently played no role in Rudolf's deposition and Hugh's acclamation. He was probably gravely ill, since Liutprand of Cremona, writing in 924–25, already thought him dead. His last recorded action, probably shortly before he died, was a donation to the church of Saint Andrew in Turin, which was witnessed by King Hugh on 28 February 929.

== Sources ==
- Fasoli, Gina, "Adalberto d'Ivrea". Dizionario Biografico degli Italiani, 1. Rome: Istituto dell'Enciclopedia Italiana, 1960.
- Wickham, Chris. Early Medieval Italy: Central Power and Local Society, 400–1000. London: MacMillan Press, 1981.

Adalbert I of Ivrea House of Ivrea
| Preceded by Anscar I | Margrave of Ivrea c. 898–c. 930 | Succeeded by Berengar |
