= Guilla of Provence =

Frankish Queen consort

Guilla (or Willa) of Provence or Burgundy (873-924) was an early medieval Frankish queen consort in the Rhone valley.

It is certain that she was first the consort of Rudolf I of Upper Burgundy (who was proclaimed king in 888 and died on 25 October 911) and later, from 912, consort of Hugh of Arles, border count of Provence, who in 926 became king of northern Italy.

Everything else in her genealogy is more or less uncertain. She is believed to have been a daughter of Boso of Lower Burgundy (Provence), and she is presumed to have been the mother of King Rudolph II of Burgundy. These two kinships enjoy some indicative support from near-contemporary sources. The first-mentioned kinship would make her at least half-sister of Louis the Blind. The second would mean she was an ancestress of the last independent Burgundian royal house, and through it ancestress of last Ottonian emperors, of the last Carolingian king of France, of a number of dukes of Swabia, of the later Guelph dynasty, and of the Salian Imperial House, as well as of practically all European royal families since the High Middle Ages.

Queen Guilla's date of death, after 912 and before 924, is determined because of a charter (expressing her to be dead) dated in 924.
