= Boso of Tuscany =

Margrave of Tuscany from 932 to 936

Boso (Italian: Bosone; died after 948) was a Burgundian nobleman who spent much of his career in Italy, where he became margrave of Tuscany around 932. He ruled semi-autonomously and was a benefactor of the churches in his region. He lost his office in 936 and probably returned to Burgundy.

== Years in Provence ==
Boso was the second son of Count Theobald of Arles and Bertha, the illegitimate daughter of King Lothair II. His elder brother, Hugh, was born in 880 or 881. His family belonged to the highest ranks of the Carolingian aristocracy and was related by marriage to the Carolingian dynasty and the Bosonids, the ruling family of Provence.

After Theobald's death in 895, Boso's mother remarried Adalbert the Rich, then margrave of Tuscany. Boso and Hugh inherited their father's counties. After Emperor Louis III was blinded by his foes in 905, Hugh assumed the regency in Provence and the county of Arles, while Boso took over the county of Avignon. In 907 Hugh and Boso entered Italy with an army in support of their mother. (Note: This campaign has been dated to as late as between 917 and 923.) In 926, after Hugh had become king of Italy, he appointed Boso regent of Provence. In 931 he brought Boso to Italy at the same time he made his son Lothair co-ruler, seeking to strengthen his position against the powerful margrave Lambert of Tuscany. Lambert was reputedly the son of Adalbert and Bertha and the half-brother of Hugh and Boso. According to Liutprand of Cremona, contemporary rumours held that Bertha, unable to conceive and intent on safeguarding her second husband's succession, had feigned pregnancy and presented as her own two sons, Lambert and Guy, who were actually the children of others. (Note: Hugh does not seem to have questioned the legitimacy of Guy's birth when he married Guy's widow, Marozia.)

== Early years in Italy ==
In his earliest documented presence in Italy, Boso is recorded intervening on behalf of the Patriarchate of Aquileia on 17 October 931. The first document recording his rank of "margrave" (marchio) dates to 1 July 932, when he persuaded the king to make a donation to the church of Saint Martin in Lucca.

According to Liutprand of Cremona, when Hugh forbade Lambert of Tuscany to call himself a half-brother of the king, the margrave challenged Hugh to a judicial duel, which he won. In order to obtain the march of Tuscany for himself, Boso convinced Hugh to arrest Lambert, who was subsequently blinded in prison. A more likely explanation than Liutprand's is that Lambert refused to give up his quasi-independence and, as a result, Tuscany was taken from him.

== Margrave of Tuscany ==
Few notices from Boso's rule in Tuscany have survived. Most concern his interventions with the king on behalf of the churches of Lucca and Arezzo. The last reference to Boso as margrave of Tuscany dates from 17 September 936, when he sent representatives to oversee an exchange of property by the diocese of Lucca. Later that year, Hugh removed his brother from the march and placed his own illegitimate son, Hubert, there instead.

Liutprand reports that Boso was arrested on suspicion of plotting against the king at the instigation of his wife, Willa of Burgundy. (Note: Liutprand adds that Willa was exiled to Burgundy as a punishment.) Another possible explanation is that he continued to act as autonomously as Lambert had, and Hugh removed him in favour of a more pliant margrave. Boso had married his daughter Willa—named for her mother—to Berengar of Ivrea, one of the most powerful margraves in the kingdom. This aristocratic axis may have seemed a threat to Hugh, precipitating Boso's downfall.

== Later years ==
In 940 a certain "illustrious count Boso" (inclitus comes Boso) made a donation to the monastery of Saint-Barnard-de-Romans. This is probably the same person as the margrave of Tuscany, since the monastery was known to have been patronised by Hugh and there were family possessions in the region. By his wife Willa, perhaps a daughter of Rudolph I of Upper Burgundy, Boso left four daughters: Richilda, Gisla, Willa, and Bertha. The last married first Boso, son of Duke Richard of Burgundy, and second Raymond, duke of Aquitaine. It was to her that Hugh bequeathed his huge personal wealth and his Provençal possessions.

In 948, Boso was in Arles to witness a donation by his nephew, Archbishop Manasses of Arles, to the Abbey of Cluny.

Preceded by Lambert	Margrave of Tuscany; 931–936	Succeeded by Humbert
