= Milo (bishop of Verona) =

Milo was the bishop of Verona from 948 to 961 and again from 968 to 981. His first term was in opposition to Bishop Rather and is today regarded as intrusus (an intruder), but his second term was unopposed.

Of Frankish origin, Milo was the nephew of Count Milo of Verona. In 948, the count organized a revolt of the clergy to force Bishop Rather into exile. The 18-year-old Milo was elected in his stead and confirmed, after paying a bribe, by King Berengar II. Rather claimed that Milo also paid Archbishop Manasses of Milan and requested a synod of all Italy, Gaul and Germany to resolve the dispute, perhaps seeing the Synod of Ingelheim as precedent. Rather refused to recognize his replacement, but Milo was confirmed as bishop in 951 by King Otto I of Germany, who had forced Berengar to recognize his suzerainty.

In 961, Otto I invaded Italy and deposed Berengar. He appointed Ernest as count in Verona and restored Rather as bishop. This decision was confirmed by the Council of Pavia the following year. Milo agreed to resign in December 961, probably on the understanding that he would succeed Rather, who was in his seventies. Nevertheless, a faction within the Veronese church opposed to Rather's reforms argued that Milo was the rightful bishop. Milo seems also to have the support of the other bishops of Lombardy. On 12 February 965, Rather declared all of Milo's ordinations and appointments null and void, although he moderated this order the next day. After Otto left Italy, he was offered a bribe to step aside in favour of Milo. Bishop Hubert of Parma urged him to accept but he refused. In December 965, Rather wrote an accusatory letter to Milo. He held him responsible for fomenting the opposition to him and accused of trying to have him assassinated.

Milo was restored to Verona in 968 with the support of Otto I. The surviving records of his episcopal activity concern the management of the diocese's property. He must have had disagreements with the cathedral clergy, since, around 973, Pope Benedict VI ordered him not to interfere with the archpriest and archdeacon in this area.

Milo was bishop as late as 981. The date of his death is not known. He was probably not long dead in June 983, since no bishop of Verona attended the diet of Verona at that time. He was succeeded by Hilderic by the end of 983.

== Bibliography ==
- Castagnetti, Andrea (1999). Fra i vassalli: marchesi, conti, 'capitanei', cittadini e rurali (dalla documentazione del Capitolo della Cattedrale di Verona: secoli X–metà XII) (PDF). Verona: Libreria Universitaria Editrice.
- Ederle, Guglielmo; Cervato, Dario (2002). I vescovi di Verona: dizionario storico e cenni sulla Chiesa veronese. Della Scala.
- Gams, Pius Bonifatius (1873). Series episcoporum Ecclesiae catholicae: quotquot innotuerunt a beato Petro apostolo. Typis et Sumptibus Georgii Josephi Manz.
- Miller, Maureen Catherine (1993). The Formation of a Medieval Church: Ecclesiastical Change in Verona, 950–1150. Cornell University Press.
- Reid, Peter L. D., ed. (1991). The Complete Works of Rather of Verona. Center for Medieval and Early Renaissance Studies.
- Roberts, Edward (2019). "Bishops on the Move: Rather of Verona, Pseudo-Isidore, and Episcopal Translation". The Medieval Low Countries. 6: 117–138.
