= March of Ivrea =

Buffer state between medieval Italy and France from the 9th–11th centuries

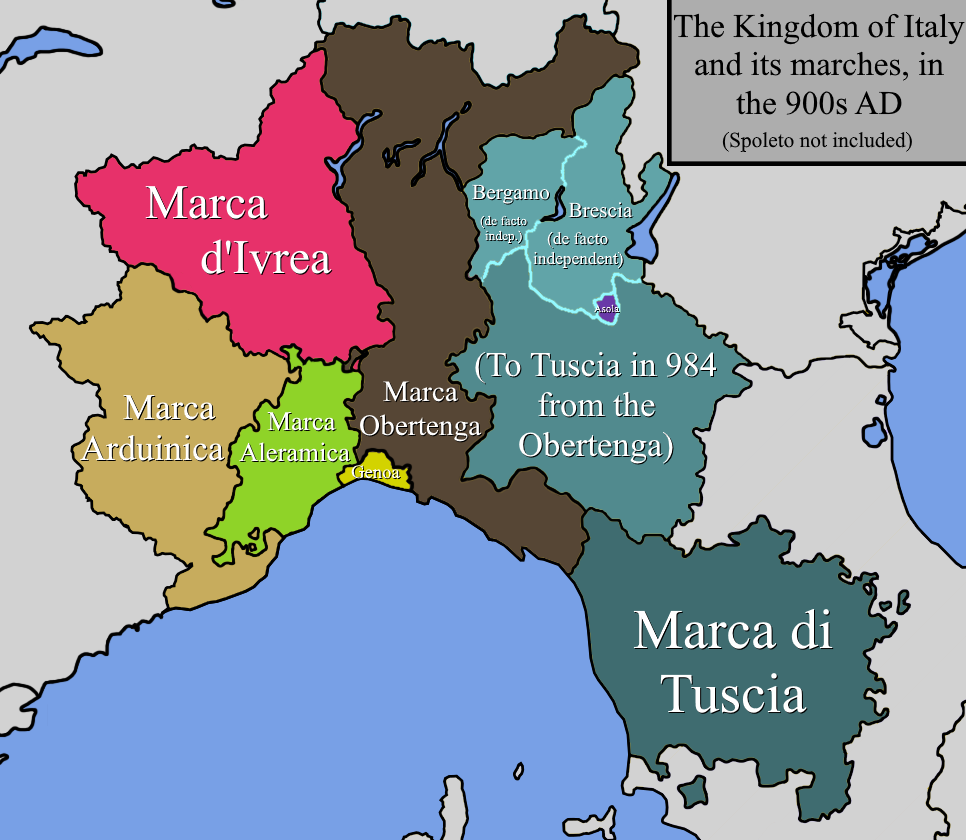
Imperial marches of Northern Italy in the 900s

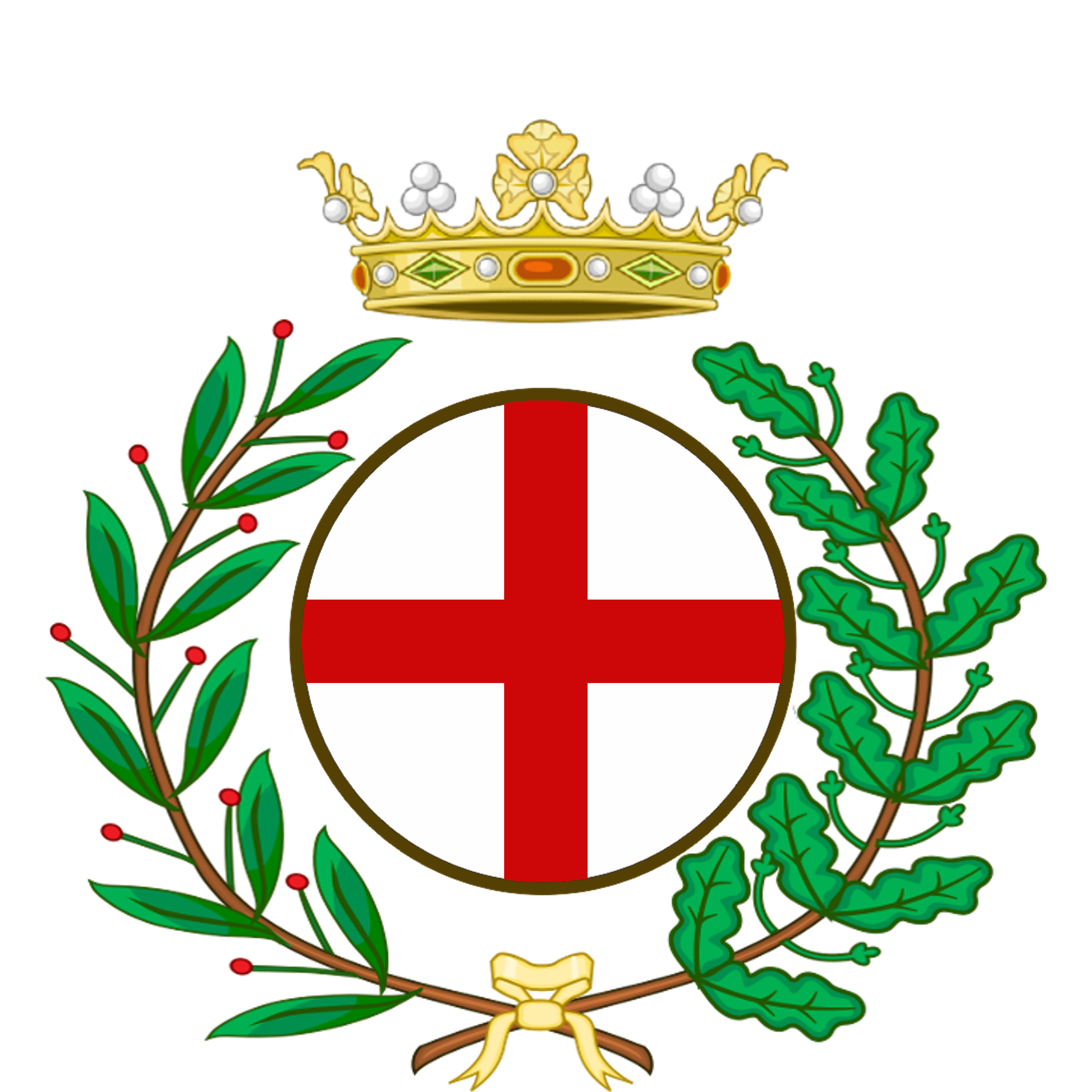
Coat of arms of the March of Ivrea

The March of Ivrea was a large frontier county (march) in the northwest of the medieval Italian kingdom from the late 9th to the early 11th century. Its capital was Ivrea in present-day Piedmont, and it was held by a Burgundian family of margraves called the Anscarids. The march was the primary frontier between Italy and Upper Burgundy and served as a defense against any interference from that state.

== History ==
Upon the deposition of the Carolingian king Charles the Fat by his nephew Arnulf of Carinthia in 887, the power in Italy was assumed by the Unruoching margrave Berengar of Friuli, who received the Iron Crown of the Lombards from the hands of Archbishop Anselm II of Milan. Arnulf, King of East Francia marched against Italy to gain the Lombard crown for himself and Berengar chose to pay homage to him, which led to discord with the Italian nobility. They supported the ambitious Duke Guy III of Spoleto, who had just failed to succeed Charles in West Francia. Now, with the support of Archbishop Anselm and Pope Stephen V, Guy prevailed against Berengar and had himself crowned King of Italy at Pavia in 889.

Guy had created the March of Ivrea for his vassal Anscar in 888. Anscar and his relatives had been some of Guy's supporters in his failed quest for the French throne. The initial Eporedian march consisted of Piedmont and most of the Ligurian coast with the counties of Acqui, Alba, Asti, Bredulo, Auriate, Turin, Ivrea, Vercelli, Pombia, Stazzona, Bulgaria, Lomello, Savona, and Ventimiglia. Anscar remained a loyal supporter of Guy and his son Lambert, even when King Arnulf, called by Pope Formosus. again invaded Italy in 894. When Lambert was deposed in 896 however, Anscar turned to his rival Berengar of Friuli, who managed to secure his rule in Italy after Arnulf's death in 899. In 902 Anscar bequeathed the lands of Ivrea to his son Adalbert I, who had married Berengar's daughter Gisela.

Adalbert however was on bad terms with his father-in-law: together with Margrave Adalbert II of Tuscany he backed Berengar's Bosonid rival Louis the Blind, King of Lower Burgundy (Provence). Louis was defeated and Adalbert had to flee from his margraviate to neighbouring Provence. Nevertheless he returned with his new ally King Rudolph II, King of Upper Burgundy, They finally defeated Berengar at the Battle of Firenzuola (923). Even after Rudolph had to cede Italy to Hugh of Provence in 926, the Anscarid fortunes rose in the middle of the century and some margraves became kings of Italy. But in the early eleventh century the margraviate fell vacant and the Emperor Conrad II did not appoint a new margrave.

== List of Margraves of Ivrea ==
- 888 – 902 Anscar I
- 902 – 929 Adalbert I
- 929 – 936 Anscar II
- 936 – 957 Berengar
- 957 – 965 Guy
- 965 – 970 Adalbert II
- 970 – c. 990 Conrad
- c. 990 – 1015 Arduin

== Sources ==
- Wickham, Chris (1981). Early Medieval Italy: Central Power and Local Society 400–1000. MacMillan Press. ISBN 978-0333266717.
