= Arduin of Ivrea =

King of Italy (r. 1002 to 1014)

Arduin
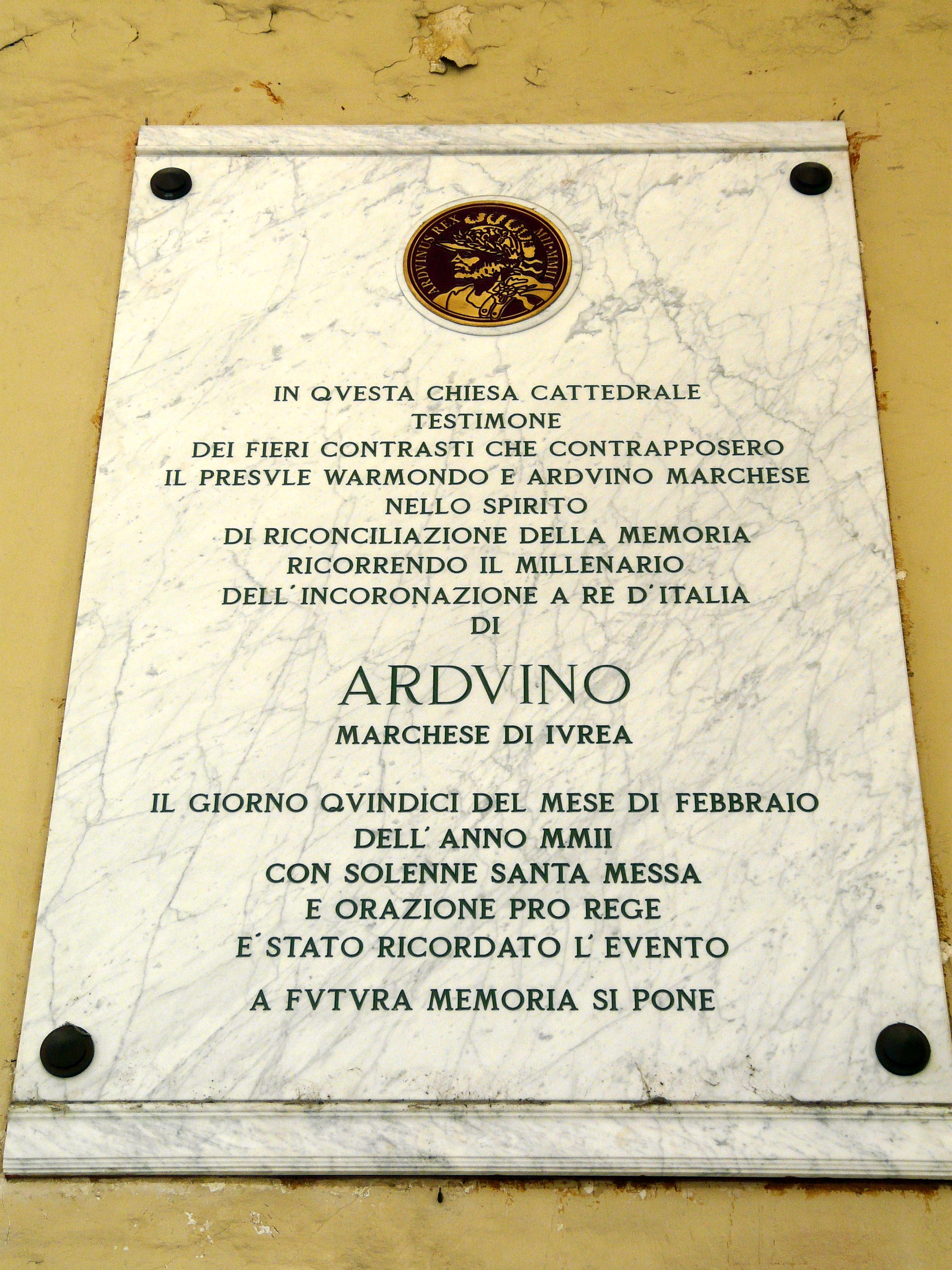

King of Italy
- Reign: 15 February 1002–1014
- Coronation: 14 May 1004, in San Michele Maggiore
- Predecessor: Otto III
- Successor: Henry II
- Born: c. 955; Pombia, Kingdom of Italy
- Died: 14 December 1015 (aged 59–60); Abbey of Fruttuaria, Italy
- Burial: Abbey of Fruttuaria
- Spouse: Bertha
- Issue: Arduin; Otto; Guibert
- House: Anscarids
- Father: Dado of Pombia
- Religion: Chalcedonian Christianity

Arduin (Italian: Arduino; c. 955 – 14 December 1015) was an Italian nobleman who was king of Italy from 1002 until 1014.

In 990 Arduin became margrave of Ivrea and in 991 count of the Sacred Palace of the Lateran in Rome. In 1002, after the death of Emperor Otto III, the Italian nobles elected him king of Italy in the Basilica of San Michele Maggiore in Pavia, making him the first non-German on the Italian throne in 41 years. Arduin was considered the choice of the nobility and opposed by the episcopate, but he was initially supported by the archbishop of Milan.

In Germany, however, Henry II was elected to succeed Otto, and he contested Arduin's election in Italy. In 1004, Henry invaded Italy, defeated Arduin and was crowned king in Pavia. He soon withdrew back to Germany, and Arduin was able to reassert his authority at least in the northwest of Italy for the next decade. Henry II invaded Italy again in 1014 and was proclaimed emperor in Rome, at which point Arduin was finally forced to relinquish his crown. He died soon after at the Abbey of Fruttuaria, ending the independence of the Kingdom of Italy from Germany.

The study of Arduin's reign has been bedeviled by the many forged diplomas in his name. These caused older scholarship to overrate his importance after Henry's first expedition in 1004, but it is now clear that Arduin's sphere of influence was restricted to a small part of Italy after that. He did, however, have continuing support in Pavia.

== Background ==
Arduin was born around 955 in Pombia during a period in which the Kingdom of Italy was struggling to maintain its independence from the ambitions of the Kingdom of Germany. Italy was conquered in 961 by the German king Otto the Great, and the Italian King Berengar II was deposed. Arduin, Berengar's grand-nephew, was only a boy when this happened. Although Otto unified the crowns of Italy and Germany and was crowned emperor, this did not erase the influence of Berengar's Anscarid dynasty in northern Italy, as the March of Ivrea was inherited by Berengar's third son Conrad.

In the subsequent years, the political situation in Northern Italy was marked by the struggle between the bishops (who at the time were high-ranking nobles appointed by the emperor himself to rule the largest fiefs, and who thus owed their fortune to their personal relationship with him) and the minor nobles, whose only source of livelihood were small, rural fiefs, and who were threatened by the expansionism of the bishops.

== Biography ==
=== Margrave of Ivrea ===
Arduin was born around 955 in Pombia and named after his maternal grandfather, Arduin Glaber. His father, Dado, Count of Pombia, was a nephew of King Berengar II. Arduin married Bertha, who is often said to be the daughter of Otbert II, Margrave of Milan. They had three sons: Arduin (sometimes called Ardicino), Otto, and Guibert. From them descended the later counts of Ivrea and in turn those of Agliè, Brosso, Castellamonte, Front, and Rivarolo.

In 990, Arduin succeeded his kinsman Conrad in the March of Ivrea. Conrad was Berengar II's son and was married to a daughter of Arduin Glaber. It is unclear if Arduin was appointed to Ivrea by the king–emperor Otto III or if he succeeded as Conrad's heir. The March of Ivrea, since its restructuring under Berengar II in 950, consisted of the counties of Burgaria, Ivrea, Lomello, Ossola, Pombia, Stazzona, and Vercelli, and the dioceses of Ivrea, Novara, Vercelli, and Vigevano, plus part of the dioceses of Pavia and Milan. Arduin became Count of the Sacred Palace of the Lateran in Rome in 991.

During his rule in Ivrea, Arduin backed the claims of the monastic orders and of the minor nobles, a policy that inevitably led to clashes with the imperially appointed bishops. The hostility turned into open conflict in the year 997, when the Emperor Otto III granted to Pietro, Bishop of Vercelli, the fief of Caresana. Arduin did not recognise the donation. There were riots in the city of Vercelli between the knights and the bishop's followers, during which the bishop was killed. Arduin intervened in the city, formally to restore order; during the clashes, the cathedral, where the bishop had been interred, was burned. The bishop-count Warmund of Ivrea condemned Arduin for the killing of Pietro, excommunicated him, and obtained from the Emperor a proclamation that the city of Ivrea, along with the land for three miles outside the walls, was free from Arduin's rule.

In the year 1000 Arduin was in Rome to explain his position to the newly appointed Pope Sylvester II. Otto III was also present in the city, and Warmund and Leone (successor of Pietro as Bishop of Vercelli) probably were as well. The Pope confirmed Arduin's excommunication and demanded that he abdicate his title in favor of his son. Arduin did not accept the sentence. He returned in his lands, and, instead of abdicating, expelled Warmund from Ivrea and rapidly conquered the cities of Vercelli and Novara, while his followers took control of Como and several cities of the Piedmont.

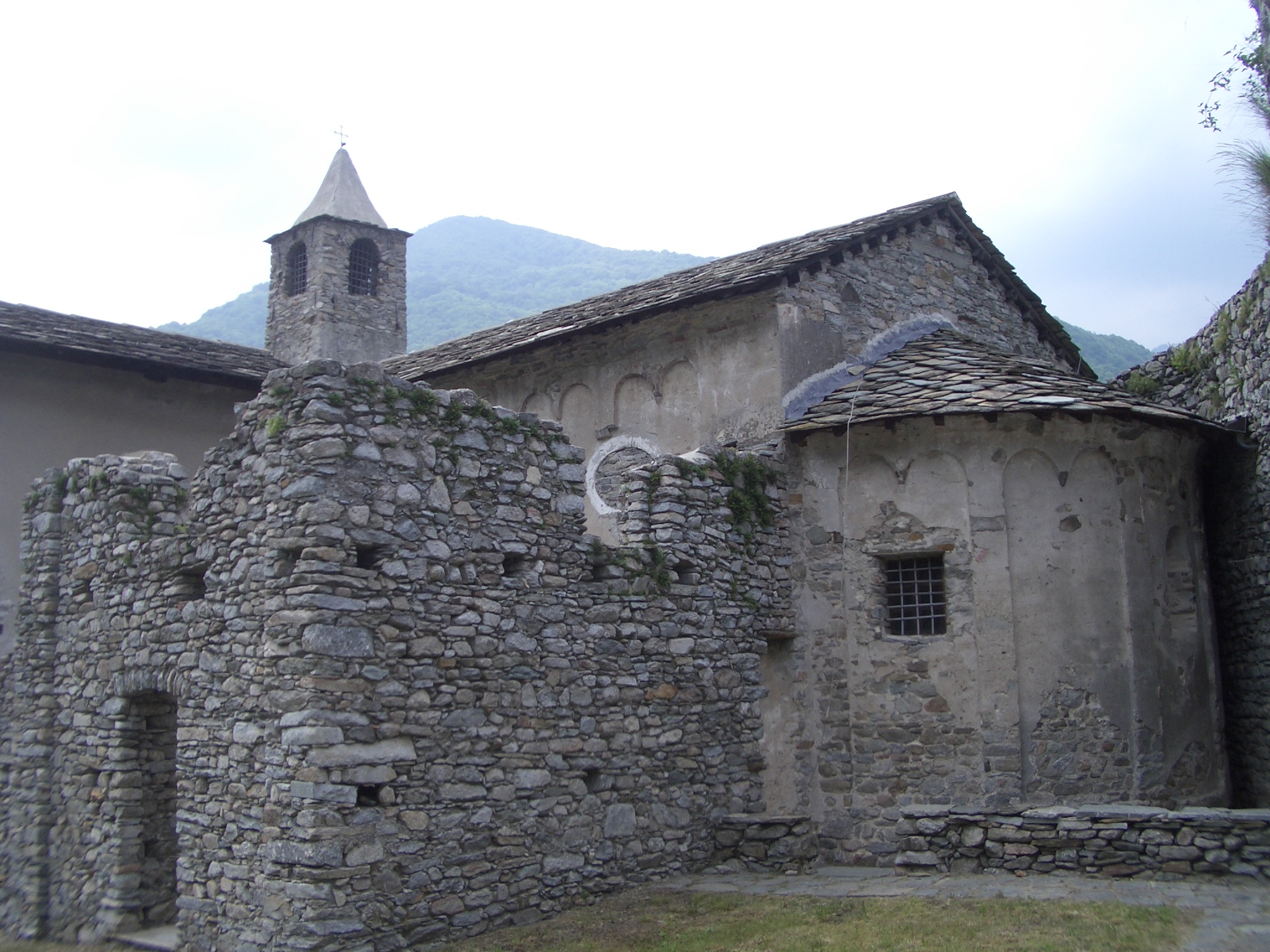
The fortified church of Santa Croce at Sparone, also known as the Rocca di Sparone or Rocca di Arduino, is the site where, according to tradition, Arduin held out against the besieging Emperor Henry

=== King of Italy ===
At that point a clash with the Emperor seemed inevitable, but Otto III suddenly died near Rome on 23 January 1002 without leaving a direct heir, throwing the empire into a succession crisis. On 15 February, a diet of feudal lords and knights in Pavia acclaimed Arduin king of Italy. According to the chronicler Arnulf of Milan, Arduin was "elected by the Lombards in Pavia and was called 'caesar' [emperor] by all". He then made the rounds of the kingdom with the archbishop of Milan publicly at his side. Arduin was crowned in Pavia, in the Basilica of San Michele Maggiore. However, while Arduin had the loyalty of the minor nobles, that of the bigger landlords, more tied to the imperial power, was much more questionable, and opposition to his rule was instigated by the bishops, led by Frederick, Archbishop of Ravenna.

In Germany, Henry II was acclaimed king on 7 June 1002, and he did not recognize Arduin's coronation. Henry granted the March of Verona to Duke Otto I of Carinthia, and then sent Otto to Italy to depose Arduin; but in the spring of 1003, Arduin defeated Otto in a pitched battle at Fabrica near the Brenta River.

This was only the beginning. Henry personally invaded Italy with a large force that left Germany in March 1004 and arrived at Trento on 9 April 1004. He met Arduin outside Verona, where Arduin was disappointed by a poor showing from his erstwhile supporters. Henry entered Pavia, the traditional Lombard capital, and had himself crowned king of Italy on 14 May in San Michele in the face of a disapproving crowd. Then he burned the city that had given shelter to Arduin to the ground. This had its effect: "All of Italy was horrified by this and likewise extremely fearful. As confidence in Arduin waned from this time on, Henry's power prevailed everywhere."

=== King in the northwest ===
At this point, Henry was satisfied by his formal recognition as ruler of Italy and returned to Germany in the early summer of 1004. Arduin had withdrawn to his stronghold in the Orco Valley, and Henry chose not to pursue him with the main body of his army. Some imperial forces besieged the valley until the winter 1004–1005 but then withdrew; afterwards, Arduin rapidly regained control of all of his previous possessions.

Arduin's rule lasted until 1014, when Henry descended into Italy again, this time to be crowned Holy Roman Emperor in Rome by Pope Benedict VIII. There were several skirmishes between Henry's army and Arduin's followers, both in Rome and as Henry began to withdraw back into Germany. But at that point the old king, probably sick and tired, chose to abdicate the Italian throne. He secured the possession of the main part of the March of Ivrea for his son Arduin II (the March was dissolved, but the younger Arduin was appointed Count of Ivrea), renounced all of his titles, and retired to the Benedictine Abbey of Fruttuaria, which he had founded in 1003. He died there on 14 December 1015.

== Coinage ==
Arduin's coinage was designed to resemble that of Otto III as closely as possible. Unusually, the character ∂, a rounded minuscule D, was used in his name to make it resemble Otto's monogram. Two types of denarius, both minted at Pavia, are known for Arduin. The first bears the inscription AR∂O +HINVS REGEM (Arduin king) on the obverse and +IHPERATOR (emperor) on the reverse. It is not clear if the latter is simply a holdover from Otto III's coinage or represents Arduin's anticipation of a future imperial coronation. The second type reads AR∂O IN GRACIA DI REX (Arduin in the grace of God king) and PAPIA CIVITAS +GLORIO (Pavia glorious city). Arduin may have been able to mint coins in Pavia after Henry returned to Germany in 1004. There are no known coins of Henry II from the period before 1014, although coins of Otto III may have continued to be struck in the confusion.

== Legacy ==
The open-hardware Arduino project name comes from an Italian bar named after King Arduin.

== Sources ==
- Arnaldi, Girolamo (1962). "Arduino, re d'Italia". Dizionario Biografico degli Italiani. Vol. 4. Rome: Istituto dell'Enciclopedia Italiana.
- Day, William R.; Matzke, Michael; Saccocci, Andrea; Screen, Elina (2016). Medieval European Coinage, Volume 12: Northern Italy. Cambridge University Press.

Regnal titles
Vacant Title last held by Otto III	King of Italy; 1002–1014	Succeeded by Henry II
Preceded by Conrad	Margrave of Ivrea; 990–1015	Dissolved
