= Anscar I of Ivrea =

Margrave of Ivrea (850–902)

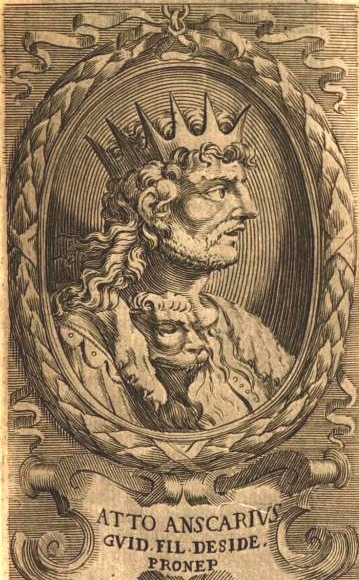
Anscar I of Ivrea

Anscar I (Latin: Anscarius; 860 – March 902) was the margrave of Ivrea from 888 to his death. From 877 or 879, he was the count of Oscheret in Burgundy. He supported Guy III of Spoleto for the throne of France after the deposition of Charles the Fat in 887, but after Guy's failed attempt and the coronation of Odo, he returned with Guy across the Alps, where the duke was elected King of Italy. In gratitude, Guy created the March of Ivrea in the northeast and invested his Burgundian supporter.

He might have been the son of Otto, cousin of the emperor Lothar II, and a grandson of Amadeus (c. 790 – 827), a count in Langres. Anscar was a counsellor of Boso of Provence and ally of his brother Fulk, who strongly supported the Carolingian dynasty in France. With Fulk, he probably invited Guy to France. Anscar fought on behalf of Guy's kingship in Italy. He battled Arnulf of Carinthia during the latter's invasion of 894 and he supported Guy's son Lambert after Guy's death that year. In 896, he was one of the few in the north to oppose Arnulf's second invasion. After Lambert's death, he supported Berengar of Friuli as king and became his chief counsellor.

Anscar's wife was unknown, but he had only one son, Adalbert, through whom he was the progenitor of the Anscarid dynasty.

== Sources ==
- Chaume, Maurice (1922). Le Sentiment National Bourguignon. Dijon.
- Wickham, Chris (1981). Early Medieval Italy: Central Power and Local Society 400-1000. London: MacMillan Press.

Italian nobility
New creation	Margrave of Ivrea; 888–902	Succeeded by Adalbert I
