= Oscheret =

Upper Burgundy, with Oscheret, in the ninth century

In antiquity, Oscheret (pagus Oscarensis, French pays d'Oscheret) was the pagus (country) of the Lingones in the lower valley and plain of the Ouche. In the Middle Ages, the same region was a county (comitatus) of the kingdom of Upper Burgundy and an archdeaconry of the diocese of Chalon-sur-Saône.

== Counts of Oscheret ==
The county of Oscheret gained prominence in the 9th century under the leadership of Count Anscar. He was one of the key nobles in the Kingdom of Upper Burgundy and held substantial influence in the region.

== Anscar and the Ivrea Dynasty ==
Following the political fragmentation of West Francia, Anscar of Oscheret migrated to Italy in the late 880s. He aligned with Guy III of Spoleto and was subsequently appointed Margrave of Ivrea, establishing the Anscarid dynasty. This lineage became influential in northern Italy, with descendants including Berengar of Italy.

== Ecclesiastical Significance ==
Beyond its secular role, Oscheret functioned as an ecclesiastical jurisdiction. It formed one of the archdeaconries of the Diocese of Chalon-sur-Saône, reflecting its religious importance in medieval Burgundy. Bouchard, Constance Brittain.
