= Bertha, daughter of Lothair II =

10th-century Margravine of Tuscany

Bertha (born between 863 and 868 – 8 March 925 in Lucca) was countess of Arles by marriage to Theobald of Arles, and margravine of Tuscany by marriage to Adalbert II of Tuscany. She served as regent of Lucca and Tuscany from 915 until 916 during the absence of her son Guy of Tuscany. She was described as beautiful, spirited and courageous, while her influence over her spouse was, coupled with ambition, attributed to have involved her husbands in many wars.

She was the second daughter of Lothair II, King of Lotharingia, by his concubine, Waldrada.

== Life ==
Between 879 and 880, Bertha married her first husband, Theobald of Arles. A Bosonid, his father was Hucbert. Hucbert's brother-in-law was Lothair II.

Bertha is also known for her curious correspondence to Caliph al-Muktafi in 906, in which she described herself rather grandly as "Queen of the Franks." Bertha's letter is of interest in that she appears to have little knowledge of Baghdad politics or culture, and it is for this reason that details of her correspondence were recorded by one of the Muslim chroniclers. Bertha was seeking a marriage alliance between herself and the Emir of Sicily, unaware that al-Muktafi had little influence over the Aghlabid colony in Sicily. Moreover, the letter was written in a language unfamiliar to the Caliph's translators, and the accompanying gifts (among them a multicoloured woollen coat) which no doubt indicated largesse on Bertha's part, were unlikely to have impressed al-Muktafi beyond their novelty value.

After the death of Adalbert II in 915, her son Guy became count and duke of Lucca and margrave of Tuscany. Bertha, as his mother, acted as his regent. She stepped down from regency in 916.

Bertha died on 8 March 925 in Lucca.

== Issue ==
Bertha and Theobald of Arles had four children:

- Hugh (882 – 10 April 947);
- Boso (885–936)
- Theutberga of Arles (890–948), married Warner, viscount of Sens
- An unknown daughter (d. after 924)

Bertha and Adalbert II of Tuscany had three children:

- Guy (d. 3 February 929);
- Lambert (d. after 938);
- Ermengarde (d. 932).

== Bibliography ==
- Metcalfe, A. (2009) Muslims of Medieval Italy (Edinburgh University Press). ISBN 9780748620074.
- Poole, Reginald L. (1912). "Burgundian Notes". The English Historical Review. 27 (106 April).
- Previté Orton, C. W. "Italy and Provence, 900-950." The English Historical Review Vol. 32, No. 127 (July, 1917) (pp. 335–347)
- König, Daniel G. (2023). 906: Bertha of Tuscany’s Correspondence with al-Muktafī bi-llāh in the Version of Ibn al-Zubayr. Transmediterranean History, 5(1). https://doi.org/10.18148/tmh/2023.5.1.66.
