= Lambert of Tuscany =

Margrave of Tuscany from 929 to 931

Lambert

Margrave of Tuscany
- In office 929–931
- Preceded by: Guy
- Succeeded by: Boso

Lambert (died after 938) was the second son of Adalbert II of Tuscany and Bertha, daughter of Lothair II of Lotharingia. He succeeded his elder brother, Guy, as count and duke of Lucca and margrave of Tuscany on his death in 938 or 939 without heirs. In 931, before 17 October, Hugh, King of Italy, disowned, removed and blinded Lambert, giving Tuscany and the familial possession of Lucca to his brother Boso. Hugh was Guy and Lambert's half-brother, as they had the same mother. When Guy died, Hugh married Guy's widow, Marozia.

Preceded by Guy	Margrave of Tuscany; 929 – 931	Succeeded by Boso
