= Arnulf I (archbishop of Milan) =

Arnulf I, known as Arnulf of Arzago, was the archbishop of Milan from 970 to 974.

Arnulf belonged to the Milanese nobility. He was elected on 16 December 970 to succeed Walpert, who had died on 9 November. He was the great-uncle of the chronicler Arnulf of Milan, who describes him as "truly declining evil and doing good" (Latin vere declinans a malo et faciens bonum). The only recorded act from his three years and four months as archbishop is his attendance at Otto I's placitum (court) in Milan on 30 July 972. On that occasion, in the palace attached to the basilica of Sant'Ambrogio, Otto granted a privilege to the monastery of Bobbio "with the licence and permission of the archbishop Arnulf" (de licentia et permissione archiepiscopi Arnulphi). This may indicate that Arnulf held comital (public) authority in Milan and its contado (district).

Arnulf died on 16 April 974. He was buried in the winter cathedral of Santa Maria Maggiore. Paolo Morigia asserted that it was Arnulf I who acquired from the Byzantine emperor the statue of the brazen serpent that now stands in the basilica of Sant'Ambrogio. It is now generally believed to have been given to Archbishop Arnulf II by Emperor Basil II.
