= Theobald of Arles =

9th-century Frankish nobleman

Theobald (c. 854 – 895), count of Arles, was a Frankish nobleman from the Bosonid family.

He was a son of Hucbert.

He and his wife Bertha had two sons, Hugh of Italy and Boso of Tuscany.
