= Arnulf of Milan =

Arnulf of Milan, or Arnulfus Mediolanensis (fl. 1018–1077) was a medieval chronicler of events in Northern Italy. He was the great-nephew of Archbishop Arnulf I of Milan.

Arnulf was born in the late 10th or early 11th century. He gives eyewitness account of 1018 in his chronicle. The last event he records took place in 1077.

Arnulf is known for his work in five books, named Liber gestorum recentium, a "book of the deeds of recent times" (written 1072–1077). Arnulf describes his labour in the first book as "a simple narrative, offered in everyday speech, of the deeds accomplished by our kings, our bishops, and our fellow citizens from Milan and beyond, as well as our compatriots in the Kingdom of Italy, which I myself have seen or somehow heard from either those who saw them or those slightly later." Unlike most Christian chroniclers of Late Antiquity and the Early Middle Ages, Arnulf did not begin with the Creation ("Nevertheless, leaving aside antiquity, let us begin from recent memory") – the Liber gestorum recentium is a contemporary account of his times, as seen from the archbishopric of Milan.

Arnulf's history begins in 925, with Hugh of Arles ("Hugh of the Burgundians") reigning as King of Italy and exercising his right to appoint an archbishop of Milan. It covers the years of the Gregorian Reforms, the reform movement of the Milanese Patarenes, and the Investiture Controversy. It ends with the kingship granted to Rudolf von Rheinfeld as anti-king of the Germans (1077).
