= Rudolph I of Burgundy =

King of Upper Burgundy from 888 to 912)

Rudolph I

King of Upper Burgundy
- Reign: 888–912
- Successor: Rudolph II
- Born: c. 859
- Died: 25 October 912
- Burial: Abbey of Saint Maurice
- Spouse: Guilla of Provence
- Issue: Rudolph II, King of Burgundy; Adelaide; Willa of Burgundy; Waldrada
- House: Elder House of Welf
- Father: Conrad II of Auxerre
- Mother: Waldrada of Worms

Rudolph I (c. 859 – 25 October 912) was King of Upper Burgundy from his election in 888 until his death.

A member of the elder Welf family, Rudolph was the son of Conrad, Count of Auxerre and his wife Waldrada. From his father he inherited the lay abbacy of Saint-Maurice d'Agaune, making him the most powerful magnate in Upper Burgundy - present-day Western Switzerland and Franche-Comté.

Partitions of the Carolingian Empire, after 887-890. Eastern Frankish Kingdom (king Arnulf, since 887) Western Frankish Kingdom (king Odo, since 888) Italy (rival kings Berengar I and Guy, since 888-889) Upper Burgundy (king Rudolph I, since 888) Lower Burgundy and Provence (king Louis, since 890)

After the deposition and death of Charles the Fat in 888, the nobles and leading clergy of Upper Burgundy met at Saint-Maurice and elected Rudolph as king. Apparently on the basis of this election, Rudolph claimed the whole of Lotharingia, taking much of modern Lorraine and Alsace - but his claim was contested by Arnulf of Carinthia, the new king of East Francia, who rapidly forced Rudolph to abandon Lotharingia in return for recognition as king of Upper Burgundy. However, hostilities between Rudolph and Arnulf seem to have continued intermittently until 894.

Rudolph's relationships with his other neighbours were friendlier. His sister/niece Adelaide married Richard the Justiciar, duke of Burgundy (the present day Burgundy, part of west Francia). He had at least four children:

1. Rudolph II, King of Burgundy
2. Adelaide, married Louis the Blind of Provence (Lower Burgundy),
3. Willa married Boso of Tuscany,
4. Waldrada married Boniface I, of Spoleto.

In 912, Rudolph was succeeded as king of Burgundy by his son, Rudolph II. Rudolph I's widow, queen Guilla, remarried to Hugh of Arles, later King of Italy.

This Rudolph is frequently confused with his nephew Rudolph of France, who was the second duke of Burgundy and ninth king of France.

== See also ==
- History of Burgundy
- Duchy of Burgundy
- Kingdom of Arles

== Sources ==
- Balzaretti, Ross (2016). "Narratives of success and narratives of failure: Representations of the career of King Hugh of Italy (c. 885–948)". Early Medieval Europe. 24 (2): 185–208.
- Bouchard, Constance B. (1999). "Burgundy and Provence, 879–1032". The New Cambridge Medieval History. Vol. 3. Cambridge: Cambridge University Press. pp. 328–345.
- Hauff, Andrea (2017). "The Kingdom of Upper Burgundy and the East Frankish Kingdom at the beginning of the 10th century". History Compass. 15 (8): 1–12.
- Hauff, Andrea (2018). "Carolingian Traditions and New Beginnings: The Coronation of Rudolph I of Upper Burgundy". Bulletin du centre d'études médiévales d'Auxerre. 22 (1): 1–13.
- Jackman, Donald C. (2008). Ius hereditarium Encountered II: Approaches to Reginlint. Editions Enlaplage.
- MacLean, Simon (2003). Kingship and Politics in the Late Ninth Century: Charles the Fat and the end of the Carolingian Empire. New York: Cambridge University Press.
- McKitterick, Rosamond (1983). The Frankish Kingdoms Under the Carolingians, 751-987. Harlow: Longman.
- Reuter, Timothy (2013) [1991]. Germany in the Early Middle Ages c. 800–1056. London and New York: Routledge.
- Riché, Pierre (1993). The Carolingians: A Family Who Forged Europe. Philadelphia: University of Pennsylvania Press.
- Wood, Susan (2006). The Proprietary Church in the Medieval West. Oxford: Oxford University Press.

Rudolph I of Burgundy Elder House of Welf Born: 859 Died: 25 October 912
Regnal titles
Preceded by Charles the Fat as Emperor	King of Upper Burgundy; 888 – 25 October 912	Succeeded by Rudolph II
