= Guy of Tuscany =

Italian nobleman (died 929)

Guy (also Guido or Wido; raised Leo; called the Philosopher) (died 3 February 929) was the son of Adalbert II of Tuscany with Bertha, daughter of Lothair II of Lotharingia.

After the death of his father Adalbert II in 915, he was the Count and Duke of Lucca and Margrave of Tuscany until his own death in 928 or 929. His mother Bertha was his regent from his father's death until 916.

He kept court at Mantua around the year 920. In 924 or 925, he became the second husband of Marozia, a Roman noblewoman who had the title senatrix patricia Romanorum.

In order to counter the influence of Pope John X (whom the hostile chronicler Liutprand of Cremona alleges was one of Marozia's lovers), Marozia subsequently married his opponent Guy of Tuscany, who loved his beautiful wife as much as he loved power. Together they attacked Rome, arrested Pope John X in the Lateran, and jailed him in the Castel Sant'Angelo. Either Guy had him smothered with a pillow in 928 or he simply died, perhaps from neglect or ill treatment. Marozia seized power in Rome in a coup d'état. Guy died on 3 February 929.

The following popes, Leo VI and Stephen VII, were both her puppets. In 931 she even managed to impose her son as Pontiff, under the name of John XI. John was only twenty-one at the time.

Preceded by Adalbert II	Margrave of Tuscany; 915–929	Succeeded by Lambert
