= Rudolph II of Burgundy =

King of Burgundy from 912 to 937

Rudolph II

King of Burgundy
- Reign: 912–937
- Predecessor: Rudolph I
- Successor: Conrad I

King of Italy
- Reign: 922–926
- Predecessor: Berengar I
- Successor: Hugh
- Born: c. 880/885
- Died: 12 or 13 July 937 (aged 51 or 57)
- Burial: Abbey of Saint Maurice
- Spouse: Bertha of Swabia
- Issue: Conrad I of Burgundy; Adelaide, Holy Roman Empress
- House: Elder House of Welf
- Father: Rudolph I of Burgundy
- Mother: Guilla of Provence

Rudolph II (c. 880/885 – 12 or 13 July 937) was King of Upper Burgundy from 912 until 933, and then King of the united Kingdom of Burgundy (the polity later known as the Kingdom of Arles) from 933 until his death in 937. He was also King of Italy from 922 to 926. He initially succeeded his father, king Rudolph I, in Upper Burgundy. In 933, Rudolph II acquired the Kingdom of Lower Burgundy (Provence) from King Hugh of Italy in exchange for the waiver of his claims to the Italian crown, thereby establishing the united Kingdom of Burgundy.

== Life ==
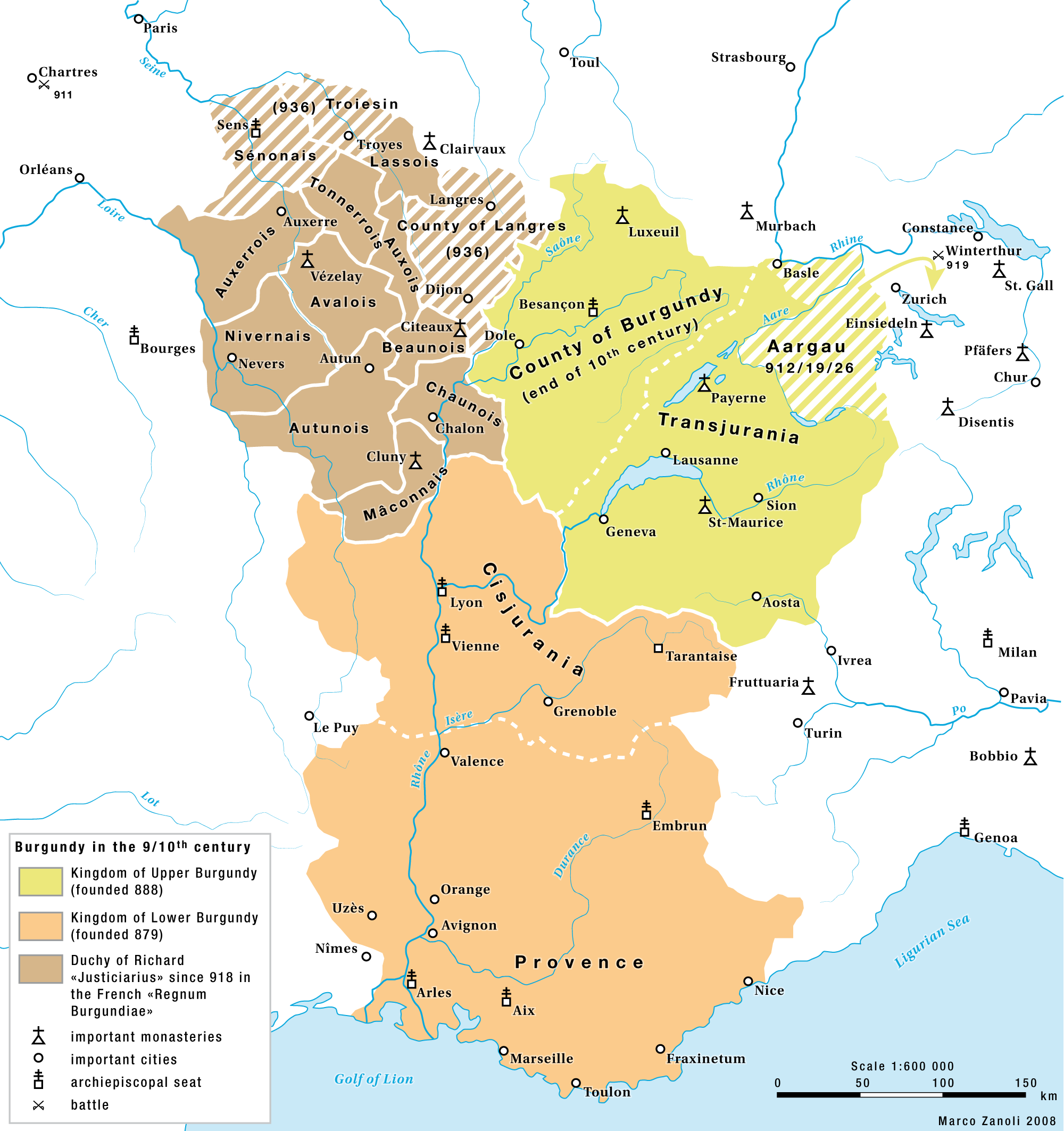
Burgundian lands (Upper and Lower) about 900

A member of the Elder House of Welf, Rudolph was the son of the Upper Burgundian king Rudolph I, and his wife Guilla of Provence. Following his ascent to the throne in 912, Rudolph II entered into a border conflict with the neighbouring dukes of Swabia and campaigned the Thurgau and Zürich estates. Duke Burchard II of Swabia finally defeated him in the 919 Battle of Winterthur; both rulers made peace and Rudolph married Burchard's daughter Bertha in 922.

At the same time, Rudolph was asked by several Italian nobles led by Margrave Adalbert I of Ivrea to intervene in Italy on their behalf against Emperor Berengar. Having entered Italy, he was crowned king at Pavia in the Basilica of San Michele Maggiore. On 17 July 923, he defeated Berengar at the Battle of Fiorenzuola; Berengar was murdered the following year, possibly at the instigation of Rudolph. The king then ruled Upper Burgundy and Italy together, residing alternately in both kingdoms.

However, in 926 the Italian nobility turned against him and requested that Hugh of Arles, the regent in the Kingdom of Lower Burgundy, rule them instead. Rudolph's father-in-law Duke Burchard II of Swabia came for his support; however, he was attacked and killed near Novara by the henchmen of Lambert, Archbishop of Milan. The king returned to Upper Burgundy to protect himself, assuring Hugh's coronation as King of Italy in the process. In 926 or 935, Rudolph rendered the royal symbol of the Holy Lance to the East Frankish king Henry the Fowler in exchange for the Swabian Basel estates.

In 928, king Louis the Blind of Lower Burgundy died, and the rule over that territory was inherited by king Hugh of Italy, Rudolph's rival. In order to secure his position in Italy, Hugh agreed to cede his claims and rule over Lower Burgundy, in exchange for Rudolph's renunciation of any Italian claims. On those bases an agreement was reached, and the two Burgundian realms (Upper and Lower) were unified from 933, under Rudolph's rule. He died in 937 and was succeeded by his son Conrad.

After his death in 937, his daughter Adelaide was married to Hugh's son Lothair, while Hugh married Rudolph's widow Bertha. (Note: "When Rudolf II died in 937, leaving only a young son, Hugh immediately married his widow, Bertha of Swabia...") Adelaide later became the second wife of Otto the Great, crowned Holy Roman Emperor in 962, and the mother of Emperor Otto II.

== See also ==
- History of Burgundy
- Duchy of Burgundy
- Kingdom of Arles

== Sources ==
- Balzaretti, Ross (2016). "Narratives of success and narratives of failure: Representations of the career of King Hugh of Italy (c. 885–948)". Early Medieval Europe. 24 (2): 185–208.
- Bouchard, Constance B. (1999). "Burgundy and Provence, 879–1032". The New Cambridge Medieval History. Vol. 3. Cambridge: Cambridge University Press. pp. 328–345.
- Hauff, Andrea (2017). "The Kingdom of Upper Burgundy and the East Frankish Kingdom at the beginning of the 10th century". History Compass. 15 (8): 1–12.
- Hauff, Andrea (2018). "Carolingian Traditions and New Beginnings: The Coronation of Rudolph I of Upper Burgundy". Bulletin du centre d'études médiévales d'Auxerre. 22 (1): 1–13. Archived from the original on 18 November 2023.
- Jackman, Donald C. (2008). Ius hereditarium encountered II: Approaches to Reginlint. State College, Pennsylvania: Editions Enlaplage.
- McKitterick, Rosamond (1983). The Frankish Kingdoms Under the Carolingians, 751-987. Harlow: Longman.
- Squatritti, Paolo, ed. (2007). The Complete Works of Liudprand of Cremona. Washington: The Catholic University of America Press.
- Wickham, Chris (2009). The Inheritance of Rome. Viking Penguin. ISBN 978-0-670-02098-0.
- Wood, Susan (2006). The Proprietary Church in the Medieval West. Oxford: Oxford University Press.

Rudolph II of Burgundy Elder House of Welf Born: c. 880 Died: 937
Regnal titles
Preceded by Rudolph I	King of Burgundy; 912–937	Succeeded by Conrad
Preceded by Berengar I	King of Italy; 922–926	Succeeded by Hugh
