= Hugh of Italy =

King of Italy from 926 to 947

- Duke of Provence
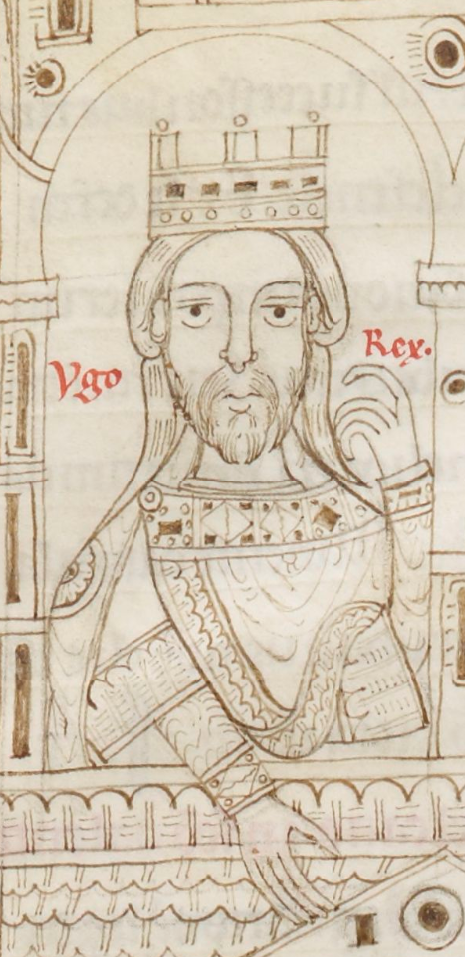
- Hugh as depicted in the 12th-century cartulary of San Clemente Abbey

King of Italy
- Reign: 926–947
- Predecessor: Rudolph
- Successor: Lothair II
- Born: c. 880/885; Arles, Kingdom of Provence
- Died: 10 April 948 (aged 67–68); Arles, Kingdom of Provence
- Spouses: Willa of Provence; Alda; Marozia; Bertha of Swabia
- Issue: Alda of Vienne; Lothair II of Italy; Hubert, Duke of Spoleto
- House: Bosonid
- Father: Theobald, Count of Arles
- Mother: Bertha of Lotharingia
- Religion: Chalcedonian Christianity
- Signum manus

Hugh of Italy (c. 880/885 – April 10, 948), known as Hugh of Arles or Hugh of Provence, was the king of Italy from 926 until 947, and regent in Lower Burgundy and Provence from 911 to 933. He belonged to the Bosonid family. During his reign in Italy, he empowered his relatives at the expense of the aristocracy and tried to establish a relationship with the Byzantine Empire. He had success in defending the realm from external enemies, but his domestic habits and policies created many internal foes and he was removed from power before his death.

== Early life ==
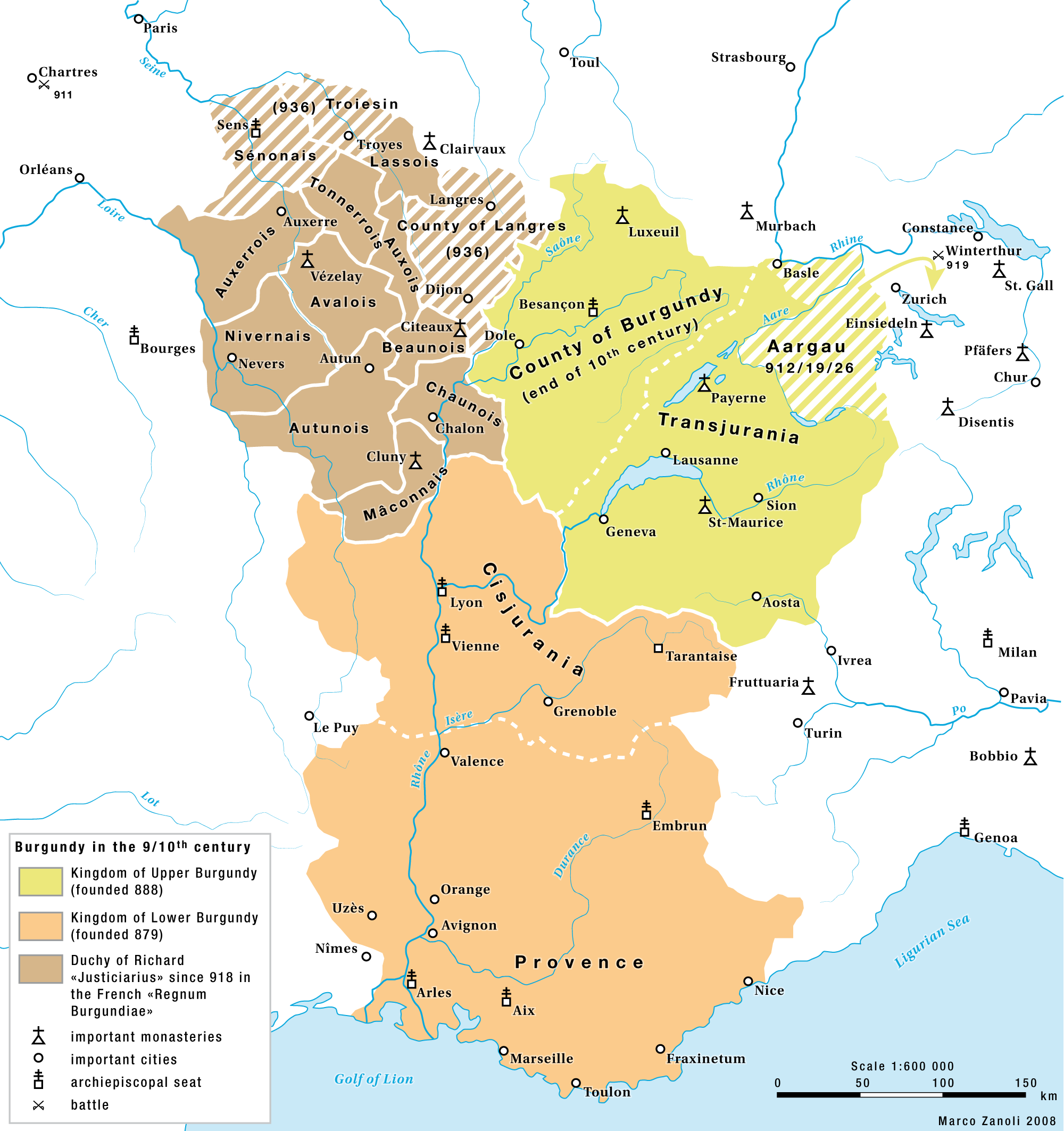
Burgundian and Provencal regions during the 9th and 10th centuries Lower Burgundy, with Provence, under Hugh′s regency from 911 to 933 Upper Burgundy Duchy of Burgundy

Hugh of Arles was born in 880/885, the eldest surviving son of Count Theobald of Arles and Bertha of Lotharingia. By inheritance, he was count of Arles and Vienne, which made him one of the most important and influential nobles in the Kingdom of Lower Burgundy (Provence). After King and Emperor Louis III was captured, blinded, and retreated from Italy to Burgundy in 905, Hugh became his chief adviser in Lower Burgundy and Provence. By 911, most of the royal prerogatives were exercised by Hugh as regent, and Louis ceded him the titles dux of Provence and marchio of the Viennois.

He moved the capital to his family's chief seat of Arles and in 912 married Willa, widow of King Rudolph I of Burgundy. Hugh then unsuccessfully attempted to take Burgundy from Rudolph's son, Rudolph II.

At an unknown date, a Provençal army led by Hugh, his brother Boso, and Hugh Taillefer invaded Lombardy with the support of Hugh's mother. On the basis of the account of Constantine Porphyrogenitus, this event has been dated to as late as 923–924, but the account of Liutprand of Cremona dates the event earlier, between 917 and 920.

About 922, a sizable faction of Italian nobles revolted against the by-then Emperor Berengar and elected Rudolph II as their king. This started a civil war, which resulted in Berengar's death in 924.

== King of Italy ==
Kingdom of Italy and its regions in the middle of the 10th century

Rather than accept Rudolph, Berengar's partisans now elected Hugh as king (925). Rudolph was ejected from Italy in 926 and Hugh crossed the Alps to be crowned. In his absence, king Louis the Blind transferred his county of Vienne to Charles-Constantine. Louis died on 5 June 928 and Hugh returned to Provence to sort out a succession.

For whatever reasons, neither Charles Constantine nor Hugh was elected king, but Hugh annexed the kingdom to Italy de facto, issuing diplomata concerning Provence from his Italian chancery in a royal style. He also took control of the right to grant fiefs in Provence.

During his early years of reign, Hugh somewhat improved the central administration of the kingdom, achieving rather more (though not total) success against the Magyar raids that had been plaguing Italy for several decades.

In September 928, Hugh met with Rudolph of France and Herbert II of Vermandois in Burgundy. Hugh granted Herbert's son Odo Vienne in opposition to Charles Constantine. He was still in conflict with Rudolph of Burgundy and hoped to ally with the King of France against the Burgundian monarch. By 930, however, Charles was in complete control of Vienne and by 931, Rudolph of France was claiming suzerainty over the Viennois and Lyonnais. In light of these reverses in his transalpine policy, Hugh turned his attention towards securing his rule in Italy and receiving the imperial crown. He induced the Italian nobility to recognise his son Lothair as their next king and crowned him in April 931. That same year, he accused his half-brother Lambert of Tuscany of conspiring for the crown – perhaps with the support of a faction of nobles – and deposed him, bestowing the March of Tuscany on his brother Boso. Hugh, however, had other reasons for deposing Lambert, who presented an obstacle to his second marriage to Marozia. Lambert's supporters called in Rudolph of Burgundy, whom Hugh bribed off with the gift of the Viennois and Lyonnais, which Rudolph successfully occupied. In 933, Rudolph relinquished all his rights to Italy.

In 936, Hugh replaced Boso of Tuscany with his own son Humbert. He granted Octavion in the Viennois to Hugh Taillefer and patched up his relations with Charles Constantine in a final effort to save influence in Provence.

== Second marriage ==
However, Hugh's attempt to strengthen his power further by a second marriage failed disastrously. His bride was Marozia, senatrix and effective ruler of Rome and widow first of Alberic I of Spoleto and then of Hugh's own half-brother Guy of Tuscany. This last fact, though, meant that the marriage was illegal under canon law, because of the relationship of affinity between them – a matter that Hugh tried to circumvent by disowning and eliminating the descendants of his mother's second marriage and giving Tuscany to a relative on his father's side of the family, Boso. This in turn, however, alarmed Alberic II, Marozia's teenage son or stepson from her first marriage, who, appealing to Roman distrust of the foreign troops Hugh had brought with him, launched a coup d'état during the wedding festivities. Hugh managed to flee the castle by sliding down a rope and rejoining his army, but Marozia was imprisoned until her death a few years later.

Hugh's power in Italy was damaged but not destroyed by these events. To strengthen his hand in the affairs of Milan, he tonsured his younger illegitimate son, Tebald, to groom him for the position of Archbishop of Milan; however, the ancient cleric, Arderic, whom he installed pro tem lived another twenty-two years. He continued to organise the fight against the Magyars and the Andalusian pirates based at Fraxinet in Provence. Active, if sometimes dubious, diplomacy paid off. He concluded a treaty with Rudolph in 933 by which Rudolf abandoned his claims to Italy in return for being handed Provence over the heads of Louis the Blind's heirs and the marriage of Rudolph's daughter Adelaide to Hugh's son Lothair. Friendly relations were maintained with the Byzantine Empire and, in 942, Hugh even came to terms with Alberic, who married one of Hugh's daughters.

Within the kingdom, Hugh intensified his existing habit of giving any available offices or lands to relations, including his numerous legitimate and illegitimate progeny, and a small circle of old and trusted friends. The effect this had on Italian nobles who saw this as a threat eventually resulted in rebellion. In 941, Hugh expelled Berengar of Ivrea from Italy and abolished the March of Ivrea.

In 945, Berengar returned from exile in Germany and defeated Hugh in battle. By a diet of nobles held at Milan, Hugh was deposed, and fled to Provence, while Lothair remained as king in Italy. By 946, Hugh managed to come to terms with his opponents by which he nominally kept the crown and the title rex (king), and thus returned to Italy, rejoining his son there. In 947, Hugh decided to retire, leaving Lothair as the sole king in Italy, but with much of the real power in Berengar's hands.

In the spring of 947, Hugh retired to Provence, and died there on April 10, 948.

== Family ==
By four wives and at least four mistresses, Hugh left eight children. With his first wife, Willa of Provence, Hugh had no children. His only legitimate children were both from his second wife, Alda or Hilda, of German origin, whom he married before 924.

- Alda of Vienne, who married Alberic II of Spoleto
- Lothair, Hugh's successor.

By his third wife, Marozia, and his fourth, Bertha of Swabia, widow of Rudolph II, Hugh had no children. Hugh had several illegitimate children with several mistresses. By a noblewoman named Wandelmoda:

- Hubert, Duke of Spoleto, to whom he gave Tuscany

By low-born mistress named Pezola, and whom the people called Venerem:

- Bertha-Eudokia, who married the Byzantine Emperor Romanos II and took the name Eudokia (Eudocia).
- Boso, who became Bishop of Piacenza and imperial chancellor.

By Rotruda of Pavia, called Iunonem by the people and widow of Giselbert I of Bergamo:

- Rotlind or Rolend, who married Bernard, Count of Pavia.

By a Roman woman named Stephanie, to whom the people gave the nickname Semelen:

- Tebald, whom Hugh tried to make Archbishop of Milan.

By an unknown mistress:

- Geoffrey, Abbot of Nonantola

A young page educated at Hugh's court at the traditional Lombard capital, Pavia, grew up to be Liutprand, Bishop of Cremona and chronicler of the 10th century; his loyalty to the memory of Hugh may have helped fuel some of his partisan bitterness in chronicling Hugh's heirs.

== See also ==
- Kingdom of Italy (medieval)
- Italy in the Middle Ages
- Hungarian invasions of Europe

== Sources ==
- Balzaretti, Ross (2016). "Narratives of success and narratives of failure: Representations of the career of King Hugh of Italy (c. 885–948)". Early Medieval Europe. 24 (2): 185–208. doi:10.1111/emed.12140. S2CID 153782559.
- Bouchard, Constance B. (1988). "The Bosonids or Rising to Power in the Late Carolingian Age". French Historical Studies. 15 (3): 407–431. doi:10.2307/286367. JSTOR 286367.
- Bouchard, Constance B. (1999). "Burgundy and Provence, 879–1032". The New Cambridge Medieval History. Vol. 3. Cambridge: Cambridge University Press. pp. 328–345. ISBN 978-0-521-36447-8.
- Bouchard, Constance B. (2001). Those of My Blood: Creating Noble Families in Medieval Francia. Philadelphia: University of Pennsylvania Press. ISBN 978-0-8122-0140-6.
- Houghton, Robert (2020). "Hugh, Lothar and Berengar: The balance of power in Italy 945–50". Journal of Medieval History. 46 (1): 50–76. doi:10.1080/03044181.2019.1697958.
- Llewellyn, Peter (1971). Rome in the Dark Ages. Constable. ISBN 0-09-472150-5.
- McKitterick, Rosamond (1983). The Frankish Kingdoms Under the Carolingians, 751-987. Harlow: Longman. ISBN 978-0-582-49005-5.
- Previté-Orton, C. W. (1917). "Italy and Provence, 900–950". The English Historical Review. 32 (127): 335–47. doi:10.1093/ehr/xxxii.cxxvii.335.
- Riché, Pierre (1993). The Carolingians: A Family Who Forged Europe. Philadelphia: University of Pennsylvania Press. ISBN 0-8122-1342-4.
- Wickham, Chris (1981). Early Medieval Italy: Central Power and Local Society, 400-1000. Totowa, NJ: Barnes & Noble. ISBN 978-0-389-20217-2.

Regnal titles
Preceded by Rudolph	King of Italy; 926–947	Succeeded by Lothair II
