= Adventius (bishop of Metz) =

Bishop of Metz

Adventius was the bishop of Metz from 855 until his death in 875. He was a prominent figure within the courts of the Carolingian kings Lothar II (855–869) and Charles the Bald (840–877).

Adventius's family background is not clear, but historians generally agree whilst he was not born into a ‘great’ aristocratic family, it was likely still into a distinguished nobility. Adventius was educated under Drogo, illegitimate son of Charlemagne and the former Bishop of Metz (820–855) prior to Adventius's appointment to the position. He played a prominent role within Carolingian politics during the 860s and 870s.

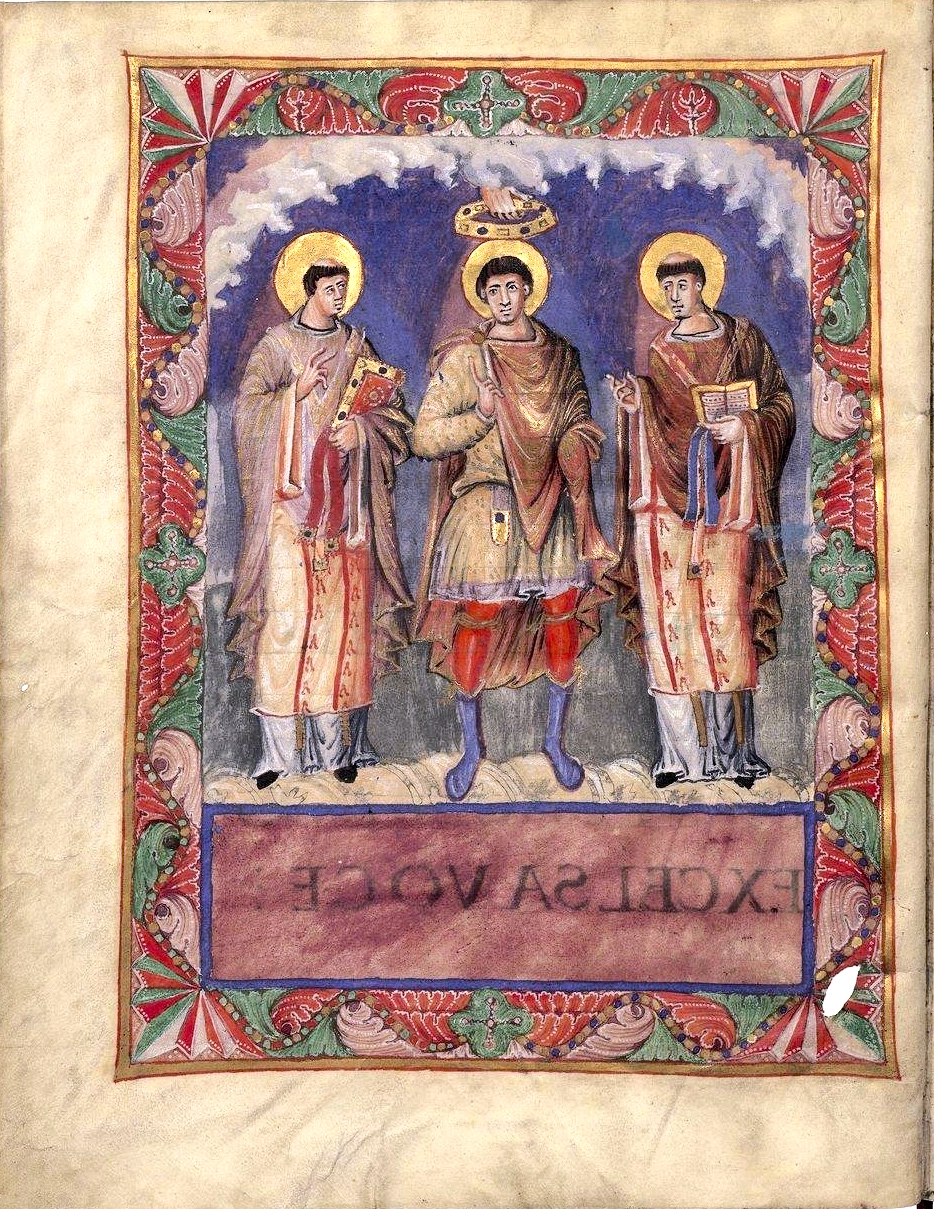
The image of the Sacramentary of Charles the Bald has been interpreted by some as displaying Charles the Bald flanked by Archbishop Hincmar of Rheims and Bishop Adventius of Metz

== Involvement in Lothar II's divorce case ==
Adventius was heavily involved in the divorce case of Lothar II (c.858–869). Lothar desired to divorce his wife Theutberga (d. 875) in favour of being with his mistress and childhood sweetheart Waldrada for a multitude of potential reasons that were used within the divorce case itself and have been speculated by historians, including Theutberga's inability to bear an heir, her family's potential political insignificance by 858, and Lothar's simple but overwhelming desire to be with Waldrada.

Adventius was primarily a supporter of Lothar's efforts to leave his wife Theutberga, although it has been suggested by historians he was a ‘moderate’ rather than a ‘hardline’ supporter of the king's intentions. This is apparent following the findings of the Third Council of Aachen in 862, which deemed that Lothar's marriage to Theutberga was over and he was allowed to remarry. Adventius and Archbishop Gunther of Cologne (850–873) both recorded their interpretations of the findings of the Council, but Adventius's account is more reserved and depicts the bishops who participated in it as merely participating in response to Lothar's request of convening the Council, whereas Gunthar's account is more forceful in asserting the findings of the Council and rebuts potential criticisms in his conclusion.

Pope Nicholas I (858–867) however, called for another council in 863 at Metz, which his legates would attend alongside Lotharingian bishops, along with specific criteria listed in his Commontorium that needed to be met in order for his approval that the decision for Lothar to divorce Theutberga was legitimate. However, the wrath of Nicholas was invoked when he learned that his legates had been bribed, and when two of Lothar's leading supporters Archbishops Gunther of Cologne and Theutgard of Trier travelled to Rome in October to present the findings of the Council, Nicholas excommunicated the pair, annulled the decision of the Council, and demanded all other Lotharingian bishops who had supported Lothar to explain themselves or risk being excommunicated themselves. Adventius was one of the recipients of this furious outburst from the pope, and in 864 sent the pope a reply in which he vehemently apologised for his behaviour and pleaded that even though present at the 863 Council of Metz, he had only gone along with the consensus and was oblivious that there had been any wrongdoing. This evidently went down well with the pope, as Adventius remained in office as Bishop of Metz, unlike his peers Gunther and Theutgard.

Lothar refused to accept this decision from the pope until 865, when he reluctantly remarried Theutberga in the presence of several leading counts and bishops, with Adventius included in this ensemble.

Although the divorce case did not see the same dramatic developments it had previously witnessed after 865, Adventius maintained a dossier of material relating to Lothar's divorce which can be found today within the Biblioteca Vallicelliana I 76 in Rome. This was presumably so Adventius had a set of correspondence and precedents with which he could back up any future debates on the divorce case.

== Political career and death ==
Although Adventius was loyal to Lothar II during the latter's reign as king, the bishop also remained on good terms with Lothar's uncle and fellow Carolingian king Charles the Bald and his prominent archbishop Hincmar of Rheims. As such, Adventius was often sent to West Francia by Lothar to deliver messages to Charles, for example in 861 and 868.

This positive relationship enjoyed by Adventius and Charles was more sharply put into focus in 869, when Lothar II died of malaria. Charles the Bald quickly had himself crowned at Metz by Adventius on September 9 869, claiming a large amount of Lothar's previous territories in the west of Lotharingia. Additionally, Adventius gave a speech that underlined the legitimacy of Charles inheriting his nephew's kingdom. Writing a generation later, Regino of Prum says Charles was easily able to inherit a large portion of Lothar's kingdom due to the ‘ingratiated’ influence of Adventius.

Various councils that occurred with either Lothar, Charles or his brother Louis the German (843-876) took place at Metz during the 860s and early 870s, and Adventius would have attended almost all of these.

Around 871, Adventius founded the monastery of Neumünster, in the Saarland, perhaps as an attempt to cement episcopal control in the far east of his diocese.

Adventius died in 875 at an unknown location.
