= Franco of Tongeren =

Early-medieval bishop of Liège

Franco of Tongeren or Tungrensis (died 903) was an early-medieval bishop of Liège.

== Life ==
Franco studied at the palace school of Charles the Bald, where he obtained a good grounding in philosophy, rhetoric, poetry, music and scripture. He became scholaster of the monastery school at Lobbes Abbey, where he went on to serve as abbot for many years before becoming bishop of Liège in succession to Hartgar. As bishop he developed the cathedral school of Liège.

He took part in the Council of Savonnières in 859 and the Council of Metz in 863, where he was among the bishops approving Lothair II's divorce from Teutberga in order to marry his mistress, Waldrada. The decision was later censured and overturned by Pope Nicholas I, and Franco eventually did penance for having been a party to it.

After Lothair's death in 869, Franco quickly recognised Charles the Bald's claims to Lotharingia. The Treaty of Meerssen in 870 divided the diocese of Liège, and the city of Liège itself, between Charles the Bald and Louis the German. On 15 November 888, Lobbes Abbey, together with 155 villages, was made a dependency of Liège cathedral, beginning the establishment of the bishopric as a territorial lordship.

In 891, Franco raised an army to support Arnulf of Carinthia in resisting Viking invaders of the Low Countries, contributing to the victorious Battle of Leuven. Franco later petitioned the pope to appoint a vicar to carry out his episcopal duties, as having shed blood in battle he no longer regarded himself as worthy of exercising the spiritual powers of a bishop.
