= De divortio Lotharii regis et Theutbergae reginae =

Treatise by Hincmar, Archbishop of Reims

The De divortio Lotharii regis et Theutbergae reginae ("On the divorce of King Lothar and Queen Theutberga") is an extended mid ninth-century treatise written by Hincmar, Archbishop of Reims (d. 882), which survives in a single manuscript, Paris BnF. lat. 2866. The front few pages of this manuscript have been lost, and so this is an assumed title. It explores the issues arising from the attempt by Lothar II, king of Lotharingia (855–869), to rid himself of his wife Teutberga and replace her with his concubine, Waldrada. Hincmar is primarily concerned with defining what marriage is and how (or if) it may be ended, and with the duties of bishops and of kings. However, in the course of discussing these questions, he touches on many other issues too, and gives much detail on ninth-century politics and religious practice in Francia.

Hincmar wrote under the guise of answering questions from bishops, publishing his answers once in early 860, and again in the summer of the same year. It is the manuscript through which significant study of the divorce is noted, allowing the modern reader insight into the issues surrounding the divorce. This treatise offers insight into changing attitudes at the time, specifically in relation to the growing influence of the Catholic Church over marriage.

== Historical Background ==
De divortio Lotharii regis et Theutbergae reginae was written in stages throughout the year 860. It was written by Archbishop Hincmar of Reims in response to letters from several anonymous Lotharingian bishops. The letters appealed to Hincmar for advice regarding the high-profile attempt by King Lothar II to divorce his wife, Teutberga, in the hopes of marrying his mistress, Waldralda.

At the time of writing, Hincmar was commenting on a topical issue in the Carolingian Empire and Christendom as a whole. The church's authority over marriage disputes were not always clear or absolute during this period. In the decade leading up to writing on the divorce of Lothar II, Hincmar had weighed in on three other documented marriage disputes, which involved issues of divorce, remarriage, and consanguineous marriage. He would weigh in on a dispute beginning in 862, in which Baldwin of Flanders "abducted" Judith, the daughter of Charles the Bald, and married her without her father's consent. Hincmar was ignored by the offenders or overruled by the pope in all of these cases.

== Content ==
Hincmar of Rheims' De divortio Lotharii regis et Theutberga reginae is a lengthy treatise that explores the issues of Lothar II's divorce through a series of questions and responses. First the author outlines the situation of the divorce case and gives context to the treatise. Hincmar dedicates a significant amount of the treatise to discussing what marriage is and uses historical and Biblical precedent to justify his definition. The question and response structure proceeds to address the issues in what is considered the most controversial divorce case in early-medieval society.

The treatise is careful to maintain a balance of opinion. Hincmar covers reasons supporting and denouncing Lothar II and his attempted divorce of Teutberga. The reason for this has been surmised as Hincmar's attempt to maintain good relations with both Lothar II and Pope Nicholas. The treatise goes on to discuss the moral issues of kingship and queenship in the context of the divorce case. Hincmar states his opinion on the duties and responsibilities of a king as a husband. The treatise's questions and responses also devote significant attention to the conflict between Christian law and civil law in the context of the attempted divorce.

== Editions ==
A recent edition is that of L. Böhringer, De Divortio Lotharii Regis et Theutbergae Reginae (1992) in the Monumenta Germaniae Historica series. A provisional English-language translation can be found here.

It has since been re-translated with accompanying commentary by Rachel Stone and Charles West, The Divorce of King Lothar and Queen Theutberga: Hincmar of Rheims's De Divortio in 2016, published by the Manchester University Press.
