= Hucbert =

Frankish count and brother of Queen Teutberga and defender of her royal marriage

Hucbert (also spelled Hubert or Hugbert; c. 820 – 864 or 866) was a Frankish nobleman and ecclesiastical official of the Bosonid dynasty. He served as Count of Valois, Duke of Transjurane Burgundy, and lay abbot of Saint Maurice's Abbey in Agaunum. He is chiefly remembered for his role in the political and military defense of his sister, Queen Teutberga, during her contested marriage to King Lothair II of Lotharingia.

== Family background ==
Hucbert was the son of Boso the Elder, a Frankish count of Valois and Turin, and Engeltrude. His sister Teutberga married King Lothair II of Lotharingia, placing the Bosonids in direct proximity to royal power. Hucbert's family would go on to establish a powerful lineage in Burgundy and Provence.

== Political and ecclesiastical career ==
Hucbert held the lay abbacy of the Saint Maurice's Abbey in Agaunum (modern-day Switzerland), granting him strategic and economic control over the Mons Iovis (Great St Bernard Pass)), a vital route through the Alps.

He was appointed Count of Valois and later emerged as the Duke of Transjurane Burgundy, administering the area bordering Italy and the Rhône Valley.

== Role in the Teutberga–Lothair affair ==
Hucbert became a central figure in the mid-9th century political struggle between King Lothair II and Teutberga, whom Lothair sought to repudiate in favor of his concubine, Waldrada. In 858–859, Hucbert led a military revolt in support of his sister’s claim to remain queen, challenging Lothair's authority in Transjurane Burgundy.

Lothair accused Teutberga of incest with Hucbert, her own brother—a politically motivated charge rejected by the Frankish bishops at the Synod of Aachen (860) and by Pope Nicholas I. Though Hucbert's military resistance initially protected Teutberga, Lothair's influence eventually prevailed, and Teutberga was temporarily exiled.

== Later years and death ==
In 859, following Lothair's territorial rearrangement, Hucbert turned against Emperor Louis II, who had received new lands in the region. After losing control over his territories, Hucbert was defeated in 864 or 866 by the sons of Conrad I of Auxerre—most likely Conrad II and Hugh of Alsace. He was killed during the conflict, possibly near Orbe in the canton of Vaud of modern-day Switzerland.

== Legacy ==
Hucbert’s career highlights the fusion of aristocratic, ecclesiastical, and military power in the Carolingian world. As both abbot and count, his authority extended across political, religious, and geographic boundaries. His defense of Teutberga marked him as a figure of loyalty and resistance during a turbulent period of dynastic crisis.

He was the father of Theobald of Arles (d. 895), who became Count of Arles and married Bertha, the daughter of Lothair II and Waldrada.

== See also ==
- Bosonid dynasty
- Teutberga
- Lothair II
- Saint Maurice's Abbey
- Transjurane Burgundy

== Sources ==
- Settipani, Christian (2014). Les Ancêtres de Charlemagne (in French) (2nd ed.). Éditions Christian.
- Riché, Pierre (1993). The Carolingians: A Family Who Forged Europe. University of Pennsylvania Press. ISBN 978-0-8122-1342-3.
- McKitterick, Rosamond (1983). The Frankish Kingdoms under the Carolingians, 751–987. Longman.
- Nelson, Janet L. (1992). Charles the Bald. Longman. ISBN 978-0582491786.
- Reuter, Timothy (1991). Germany in the Early Middle Ages 800–1056. Longman. ISBN 978-0582494039.
