= Liber memorialis of Remiremont =

Confraternity book

Folio 5r

The Liber memorialis of Remiremont is a confraternity book from the convent of Remiremont in the Vosges. The unique manuscript is preserved in Rome, in the Biblioteca Angelica, where it is shelved as Manoscritto 10. It is not known when it was taken to Rome.

The importance of the manuscript was first recognised in the 1890s by Adalbert Ebner. Since then, it has been used by many historians as a source for early medieval practices of memory, as well as for the history of the monastery of Remiremont itself.

A partial facsimile-edition was published by the Monumenta Germaniae Historica in 1970.

== History of the Liber memorialis ==
The manuscript was begun under the direction of Abbess Theuthild, who also wrote a number of surviving letters that have been translated by Michel Parisse.

It is usually assumed that the manuscript was begun in 821, before being largely rewritten in the 860s. This dating is based on a reference in the manuscript to an 'Emperor Louis', who is normally understood to be Louis the Pious. For that reason, Eva Butz and Alfons Zettler have described the Liber Memorialis of Remiremont as "a major document of the ecclesiastical and political reforms of the Carolingian Empire under Louis the Pious". However, Michèle Gaillard has suggested that the 'Emperor Louis' could in fact be Louis II of Italy, in which case the manuscript's original creation might be slightly later in date.

The manuscript initially contained liturgy for the mass, a list of rulers, and a list of benefactors. However, from the 860s, new pages started to be added, to include new groups of names. These included kings such as Lothar II, who seems to have visited the monastery in the company of Waldrada and other members of his family in late 861.

In total, the manuscript lists around 11,500 names. These names were written by over 150 different scribes, including many women.
