= Hugh of Alsace =

Hugh or Hugo (before 855 – 895) was an illegitimate son of Lothair II, king of Lotharingia, by his mistress Waldrada. His father made him Duke of Alsace in 867.

Hugh's name was not a Carolingian royal name, but it was common among the Etichonid family of Alsace, who were rumoured to be his mother's relatives. There is no concrete evidence of his mother's origins. His name however does suggest that his father did not originally intend him to succeed him as king, but instead to rule in Alsace. After Lothair repudiated his wife, Teutberga, shortly after their marriage in 855, he sought to have his relationship with Waldrada and his children with her, including Hugh, legitimized. This would become a continuing theological and political struggle, as the laws and opinions around marriage and infidelity at this time were not solid.

In December 861, Hugh was probably recognized as legitimate by his uncle, King Charles of Provence, and great uncle, King Louis of East Francia. The three royal families all signed the memorial book of the abbey of Remiremont as equals at that time. By 863, however, Lothair's request for a divorce had led to strong opposition from the church and an international crisis. It was in this situation that Lothair gave his son the duchy of Alsace during a stay at the court of Louis of East Francia. At his request, Louis then took both his kingdom and his son Hugh under East Frankish protection.

When his cousin Louis the Stammerer, king of West Francia, died in 879, he seized authority in Lotharingia west of the Rhine and the Annales Fuldenses accuse him of "playing the tyrant in Gaul." It is likely that he refused to recognise the succession of Louis's young sons, Louis III and Carloman, to the West Frankish kingdom, as with Boso in Provence. He had a sizable following in Lotharingia, but Louis the Younger, son of Louis the German, came to the defence of the young Louis and Carloman. In 880, he sent men against Hugh's castle at Verdun and defeated his army, burning down the fortress.

After his Easter court (23 April) in 882, Louis the Younger enfeoffed Hugh with Alsace, but the latter rebelled and Louis chased him in Burgundy. In 883, Hugh murdered Bernarius, Count of Charpeigne, the second husband of Friderada (widow of Engelram, Chamberlain to Charles the Bald), and married her as her third husband. He also murdered his guardian Wipert of Nantes, son of Lampert III of Nantes, as both Bernarius and Wipert opposed his ambitions. Also in 883, Hugh's sister Gisela married Godfrey, the Viking leader ruling in Frisia. With this alliance, Hugh plotted to seize his father's old kingdom, but in 885, Charles the Fat heard of the scheme and called both Hugh and Godfrey to court, where the former was blinded and the latter killed. Hugh was sent first to Sankt Gallen, then to Fulda, and finally to Prüm in his own country.

== Further ==
- E. Dummler, Geschichte des ostfränkischen Reiches (Leipzig, 1887–88)
- E. Muhlbacher, Die Regenten des Kaiserreichs unter den Karolingern (Innsbruck, 1881)
- M. Sdralek, Hinkmars von Rheims Kanonistisches Gutachten uber die Ehescheidung des Königs Lothar II (Freiburg, 1881)
