= Gunther (archbishop of Cologne) =

Archbishop of Cologne from 850 to 863

Gunther or Gunthar (German: Günther; died 8 July 873) was Archbishop of Cologne in Germany from 850 until he was excommunicated and deposed in 863.

== Life ==
Gunther belonged to a noble Frankish family and the maternal uncle of Radboud of Utrecht. According to the poet Sedulius Scottus, Gunther was a man of great ability. He was consecrated Archbishop of Cologne on 22 April 850. For a long time he refused to cede his suffragan Diocese of Bremen to Ansgar who, in order to facilitate his missionary labours, desired to unite it with his Archdiocese of Hamburg. The affair was finally settled (c. 860) by Pope Nicholas I in favour of Ansgar, and Gunther reluctantly consented.

According to Johann Peter Kirsch, in 856 Ingiltrud, wife of Count Boso the Elder, had left her husband for one of his vassals. Henry Hart Milman says that the Count abandoned his wife. Nicholas commanded the bishops in the dominions of Charles the Bald to excommunicate her unless she returned to her husband. As she paid no attention to the summons to appear before the Synod of Milan in 860, she was put under the ban. Boso and Ingiltrud's daughter was Teutberga; she married Lothair II in 855.

It is very likely that at the time of his marriage, Lothar II already had a mistress named Waldrada. According to historian Baron Ernouf, Gunther was Waldrada's uncle and Thietgaud, Archbishop of Trier was her brother. According to the Annales Novienses, Waldrada was Gunther's sister. The Vita Sancti Deicoli says that Waldrada was related to Eberhard II, Count of Nordgau (included Strasbourg) family of Etichonids.

Gunther had become archchaplain of King Lothair II, who wished to divorce his lawful wife Teutberga. At a synod held at Aachen in January, and another in February, 860, a few bishops and abbots, under the leadership of Gunther, compelled Teutberga to declare that before her marriage with the king she had been violated by her brother. Upon her compulsory confession the king was allowed to discard her and she was condemned to a convent. At a third synod held at Aachen in April, 862, Gunther and a few other Lorraine bishops allowed the king to marry his concubine Waldrada. Nicholas I sent two legates to investigate the case, but the king bribed them, and at a synod which they held in Metz, in June, 863, the divorce was approved.

Gunther and Thietgaud brought the acts of the synod to the pope and asked for his approval. The pope convened a synod in the Lateran in October, 863, at which the decision of the Synod of Metz was rejected, and Gunther and Thietgaud, who refused to submit, were excommunicated and deposed. The two archbishops drew up a document of seven chapters (reprinted in P. L., CXXI, 377–380) in which they accused the pope of having unjustly excommunicated them. They sent copies of the document to the pope, the rebellious Photius, patriarch of Constantinople, and to the bishops of Lorraine. The pope, however, did not waver even when Emperor Louis II appeared before Rome with an army for the purpose of forcing him to withdraw the ban of excommunication from the archbishops.

Though excommunicated and deposed, Gunther returned to Cologne and performed ecclesiastical functions on Maundy Thursday, 864. When, however, the other bishops of Lorraine and King Lothair submitted to the pope, Gunther and Thietgaud appeared before the synod which the pope convened at Rome in November, 864, asking to be released from excommunication and restored to their sees, but they were unsuccessful.

After the accession of pope Adrian II, Gunther and Thietgaud returned to Rome in 867. Thietgaud was now freed from the ban, but Gunther remained excommunicated until the summer of 869, when, after a public retraction (P. L., CXXI, 381), he was admitted by the pope to lay communion at Monte Cassino abbey.

The See of Cologne had in 864 been given by Lothair to the subdeacon Hugh, a nephew of Charles the Bald. He was deposed in 866 and Gunther regained his see. Being under the ban, Gunther engaged his brother Hilduin of Cambrai to perform ecclesiastical functions in his place. After the death of Gunther's protector, Lothair II, Wilbert was elected Archbishop of Cologne (7 January, 870). Seeing that all efforts to regain his see would be useless, Gunther acknowledged the new archbishop and left Cologne for good.

He died in 873.

== Bibliography ==
- (in French) Baron Ernouf (1858) Histoire de Waldrade, de Lother II et de leurs descendants (Paris).

Preceded by Hildwin	Archbishop of Cologne; 850–864	Succeeded by Hugh
