= Theotgaud =

Theotgaud (Note: Other spellings are Theutgaud, Thietgaud, Tietgaud and Tetgaud.) (German: Dietgold; died 868) was the archbishop of Trier from 850 until his deposition in 867. He was the abbot of Mettlach prior to his election in 847 to succeed his uncle, Hetto, as archbishop.

== Life ==
He took up his post three years later, but was inadequately trained in theology and politically and administratively inept. He attempted to claim the primacy of Trier over Rheims, but this failed due to the opposition of Hincmar of Rheims.

In 857, the Annales Bertiniani reported that a dog sat on the archiepiscopal throne of Trier, which was interpreted as an omen portending the fall of Theotgaud. In the middle of June 863, Theotgaud and Gunther, Archbishop of Cologne, the two archbishops of Gallia Belgica, presided over the synod of Lotharingian bishops at Metz held at the bequest of Lothair II concerning his abandonment of his first wife Teutberga and his union with his mistress Waldrada. Teutberga took refuge in the court of Lothair's uncle, Charles the Bald, and appealed to the Pope.

Pope Nicholas I sent apostolic legates to investigate the matter, but Lothair's bishops affirmed that they had advised him to spurn his lawful wife and take another. Theotgaud and Gunther gave grounds for their actions in a letter which they personally brought to Nicholas. They were summoned before the Lateran Synod of October 863, where Nicholas, suspecting the legates had been bribed, anathematised the council and deposed Theotgaud and Gunther as well as John VII of Ravenna. Theotgaud and Gunther continued to defend their actions in a seven-page document accusing the pope of unjustly banning them. The document was sent to the rebellious Photius, Patriarch of Constantinople, and to the bishops of Lotharingia. Even the Emperor Louis II, who had secured the pope's election in 858, supported the archbishops.

The Emperor, in support of his brother, advanced upon Rome with an army and laid siege to the city, arriving in February 864. However, partly through the influence of his wife, Empress Engelberga, and partly because he himself had been seized with fever, the Emperor made peace with the pope and left the city. Theotgaud, who is sometimes regarded as a mere tool of Gunther, returned to his diocese to perform his episcopal and pastoral functions for Easter despite the ban.

After the king and his bishops had submitted to the pope, the two prelates gave in and went to Rome in penitence (November 864); Nicholas, however, did not accept it. Theotgaud retired to Sabina. On 31 October 867, Nicholas sent letters to Louis the German and all the bishops of East Francia announcing that Gunther and Theotgaud were guilty of seven offences and therefore deposed from their sees and never eligible to hold ecclesiastical office again. After the accession of Pope Adrian II, Theotgaud and Gunther returned to Rome (late 867). Theotgaud was now freed from the ban, but Gunther remained excommunicated until the summer of 869, when, after a public retraction, he was admitted by the pope to lay communion at Monte Cassino. Theotgaud did not long enjoy his reconciliation with Rome. He died in 868 in Rome, at San Gregorio Magno al Celio.

== Sources ==
- Reuter, Timothy (1992). The Annals of Fulda. Ninth-Century Histories, volume II. Manchester: Manchester University Press. Archived from the original on 2013-07-28.
- Nelson, J. L. (1992). Charles the Bald. London: Longman.

Preceded by Hetto	Archbishop of Trier; 847–868	Succeeded by Bertulf
