= Drogo of Metz =

Son of Frankish emperor Charlemagne

Drogo
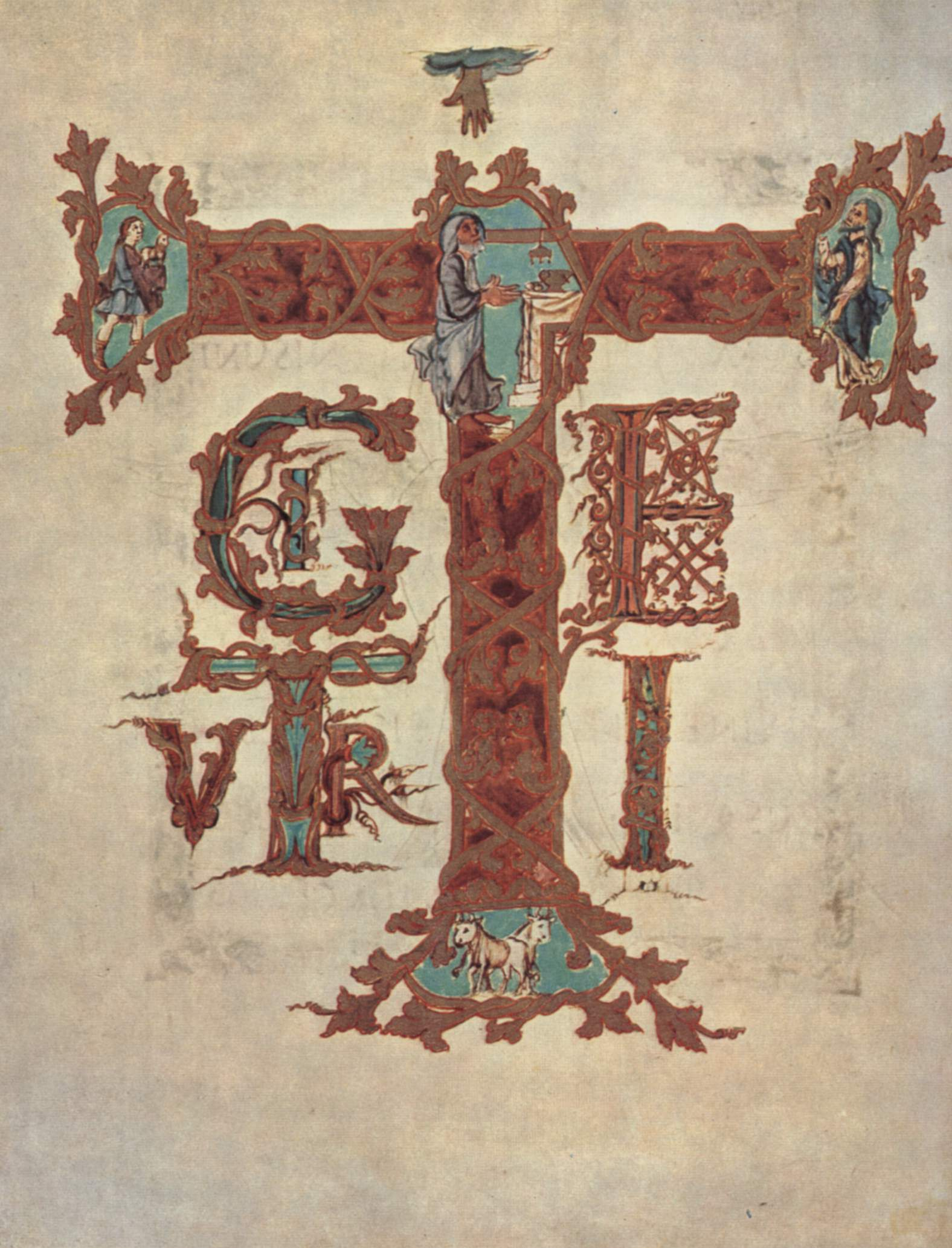
- Decorated initial T from Drogo's personal sacramentary.
- Born: 17 June 801; Aachen, Germany
- Died: 8 December 855 (aged 54); River Oignon, at Himeriacum, Bourgogne, Germany
- Father: Charlemagne
- Mother: Regina

Drogo (17 June 801 – 8 December 855), also known as Dreux or Drogon, was an illegitimate son of Frankish emperor Charlemagne by the concubine Regina.

== Early life and family ==
Drogo was born on 17 June 801 at Aachen, Gaul (Aix-La-Chappelle). The Annales Weissemburgenses record Drogo's birth as "802 aut 803 15 Kal Iul".

Aachen was the winter palace of the Carolingian Empire located in the north-east section of Gaul, close to the Saxon lands. This area is now in Nordrhein-Westfalen, Germany.

Einhard names "Drogonem et Hugum" as sons of Charlemagne by his concubine "Reginam". Drogo's mother, Regina, was one of four concubines taken by Charlemagne in 800 after the death of his Alemannian wife who had borne him no children.

Drogo had many half-brothers and sisters (through his father, Charlemagne) but only one full brother, Hugh (802–844), who was the younger. He and his brother Hugh, and their half-brother Thierry, were brought up in the palace of their half-brother Louis the Pious (Emperor Louis I) after their father died.

In the collection of Einhard's Charters, there is one written in 815 by Louis the Pious in which he grants a village (Mulinheim, later Seligenstadt) situated on the banks of the Main River to Einhard and his wife. This property was once owned by a Count Drogo. This person could possibly be identified as Charlemagne's son Drogo, although he was only 14 years old in 815.

As one of the few children to outlive his father, Drogo's prospects for political power were very favourable. Only one older son of Charlemagne remained, and was eager to ensure his few opponents were placated.

== Career ==
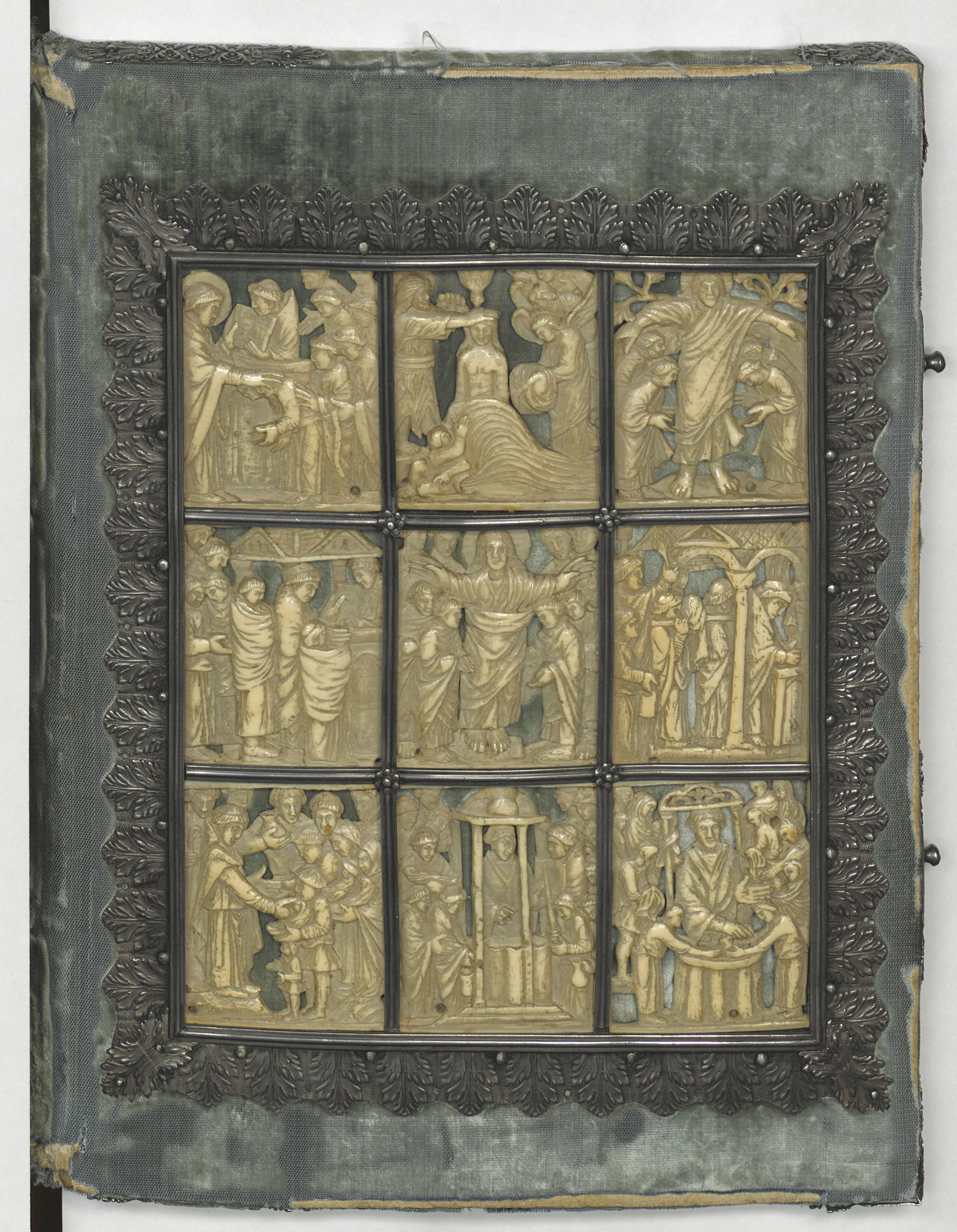
Drogo sacramentary

Forced out of the royal court when Louis the Pious became Emperor in 814, Drogo and Hugh were forcibly tonsured and "put under free custody into monasteries".

Drogo became a cleric in 818 and abbot of Luxeuil in 820.

In 822, Drogo, was installed as Bishop of Metz in 823. Drogo became less significant at court and as a court figure by 829 – he had no formal position and did not become a player again until the 830s.

Drogo wielded much influence in the last years of Louis the Pious’ reign. According to the Astronomer, Drogo was Louis the Pious’ daily confessor. It was Drogo who finally persuaded Louis to forgive his rebellious sons. Drogo became Archbishop of Metz in 844 and remained in this position for the duration of his life.

Drogo was asked by Louis, who was on his deathbed, to send the royal regalia (crown and sword) to his son Lothar thus indicating the transfer of power. Drogo took charge of his remains and had them transported from the island in the Rhine where he died. The Annales Fuldenses record that "Druogonem archicapellum et Adalbertum comitem" (Arch-chaplain Drogo and Count Adalbert) were sent to the east bank of the Rhine in 840 to take the body to Metz where Drogo presided over the funeral rites. The Sepulchre of Louis the Pious in St. Arnulf in Metz has often been considered as representative of the family tradition. Arnulf of Metz, mayor of the palace in Austrasia, is supposed to be the progenitor of the Carolingians (Arnulflings). But in fact, Saint-Arnulf of Metz was primarily a burial place for the women of the Carolingian family. Before or after Louis the Pious, no Carolingian king was buried there. One could instead see this sepulchre as a sign of archbishop Drogo's ambition of elevating his city of Metz by making it the cradle of the Carolingian family. In all probability he wished to establish Saint- Arnoul, whose patron saint was a family ancestor, as the royal mausoleum of the Carolingians (see K.U. Jaschke, Die Karolingergenealogien aus Metz, in list of sources).

In 844 following the election of Pope Sergius II, Drogo was sent by Emperor Lothar to accompany Louis to Rome. Drogo had just recently been raised from bishop to archbishop of Metz. He was appointed his Vicar apostolic for the Frankish lands of France and Germany by Sergius. Drogo also served as Vicar to Pope Leo IV and Benedict III in France.

In October 844, Drogo presided over an assembly where the three sons of Louis the Pious (brothers Lothar, Louis the German and Charles the Bald) met at Thionville to attempt to unite the three portions of the kingdom in peace. He and offered his support to Lothar, but his control over the assembly came to nothing as the attempt was referred for future action. Drogo supported Louis the Pious in 839-40 during the Third Civil War between Louis and his sons. Once Louis died, he supported Lothar then changed sides to support Charles in 841, then changed back to support Lothar.

Drogo remained extremely loyal to his half-brother Louis the Pious and amassed great power under him. He was also one of the greatest patrons of the arts in the 9th century. Drogo's influence began to wane after Louis' death, and his influence fell even more after the death of his brother, Hugh, in 844. Still, he managed to ensure the production of the Drogo Sacramentary, which is named for him. The Drogo Sacramentary was written and painted around 845–855 for his personal use, as Bishop of Metz. The manuscript, which is on vellum, is the work of several artists employed by the imperial court. The sacramentary would have been used in Metz's Carolingian cathedral and constitutes a precious record of the liturgical practices of the time and the accoutrements used in the liturgy. This manuscript is one of the monuments of Carolingian book illumination and contains all the prayers which would have been spoken by Drogo, as the officiating priest, during the course of the year. It has become a monument to his name and one of the treasures of the Bibliothèque Nationale de France.

Metz was an important bishopric: Charles the Bald was crowned in the Basilica, and both Drogo and Louis the Pious are buried there. In 843 Metz became the capital of the kingdom of Lotharingia, and several diets and councils were held there. Drogo's position enabled him to be one of the great patrons of 9th-century arts. He embellished his cathedral in Metz with works which rank among the highlights of Carolingian art in beauty and preciousness. In 852 he translated the relics of St. Celeste of Metz (see Clement of Metz) at Marmoutier, together with those of Saint Author (see Abbé Petin, Dictionnaire hagiographique in list of sources).

There is a particularly interesting entry in the Annales Bertiniani: anno 839 "Dominicae nativitatis festum hilariter, a Drogone fratre suo et Metensis urbis episcopo decentissime susceptus, in eadem civitate caelebravit". ["He (Louis the Pious) joyfully celebrated Christmas at Metz, where he had been received handsomely by his brother Drogo, the bishop of that city."]

== Death ==
Drogo died on 8 December 855 after falling into the River Oignon, at Himeriacum, Bourgogne, while fishing. He is interred at the Abbey Church of St. Arnulf in Metz. A list of bishops of Metz records "domnus Drogo archiepiscopus et sacri palate summus capellanus, filius Karoli imperatoris" ("Drogo lord archbishop and sacred palace chief chaplain, son of Emperor Charles") as 40th bishop, holding the position for 32 years, 5 months, and 7 days. After his death, he was succeeded as bishop of Metz by Adventius (858 to 875).

== See also ==
- List of Bishops of Metz
- Carolingian dynasty

== Sources ==
- Fried, Johannes (1995). "The Frankish kingdoms, 817–911:the East and Middle Kingdoms". In McKitterick, Rosamond (ed.). The New Cambridge Medieval History. Vol. II. Cambridge University Press.
- Theuws, Frans; Nelson, Janet Laughland, eds. (2000). Rituals of Power: From Late Antiquity to the Early Middle Ages. Brill.159
