= Council of Metz (863) =

The Council of Metz of 863 was arranged by Pope Nicholas I to discuss the divorce case of Lothar II, king of Lotharingia, and his wife Theutberga. The council was mainly attended by Lothar II's supporters, and thus concluded the divorce case in his favour; this decision was later overruled by Pope Nicholas I who suspected foul play. It was the fourth and final council called during the reign of Lothar II. No documents from the council survive, but as the council was controversial it is discussed in other medieval sources such as the letters of Pope Nicholas I, the Annals of St Bertin, the Annals of Fulda and the Liber Pontificalis.

== Background ==
=== Divorce case ===
Lothar II and Theutberga were married in 855 in a political alliance to secure the kingdom, when Lothar was a young king. Prior to this, he had an undefined relationship with a noble woman named Waldrada, who bore him children, most notably a son named Hugh. By 857 Lothar deemed his marriage to Theutberga undesirable, though it is not clear exactly why, and accused her of incest and abortion. In 858, a champion succeeded in a trial by ordeal to prove Theutberga's innocence, but two councils in 860 held by Lothar in Aachen nominally proved her guilt through her confession to Archbishop Gunther of Cologne.

At this point the trial became of interest to the rest of the Carolingian empire and the Pope because Theutberga sought sanctuary with Charles the Bald, Lothar's uncle who ruled West Francia. Hincmar of Rheims, a famous archbishop of Charles the Bald, also became involved at this point. In 862 Lothar held a further council at Aachen which stated that the marriage between Lothar II and Theutberga had ended, and Waldrada was now his wife.

=== Pope Nicholas I's involvement ===
The Council of Metz was arranged by Pope Nicholas I long before it actually took place. In November of 862, Nicholas wrote to the bishops assembled at Metz informing they had to investigate the divorce case against Theutberga and make a just ruling. Nicholas justified his involvement as Theutberga had appealed to him for assistance and it was under his remit of pastoral care. He is clear that the council's decision will not be final though as, if he believes the ruling is wrong, he could order another council to take place.

In early 863 he also sent letters to the bishops and archbishops of the Carolingian empire and his papal legates. In his letter to the bishops and archbishops of the Carolingian empire instructs them all to assemble at Metz to discuss the divorce case as he thinks that Lothar II is at fault and needs to be brought to justice. In his letter to his legates Nicholas outlines the lines of enquiry the legates must take at the council; most notably this was checking on Theutberga's welfare and if she is held under duress, questioning Lothar's claim of union to Waldrada, and challenging the idea Lothar was forced to marry Theutberga by her brother. Most notably given the ambiguity of Carolingian marriage, Nicholas defines a valid marriage as a public ceremony conducted by a priest, with the exchange of a bridal gift.

== Council ==
=== Attendees ===
Despite Nicholas' wishes, all but one of the Lotharingian bishops attended, but none of the bishops from the rest of the empire. Notably Hincmar was unable to attend, perhaps because he was purposely invited too late because he was critical of the divorce. Lothar II attended, but Theutberga did not attend because she was also not invited in time. The only attendees from outside Lotharingia were Bishop Radoald of Porto and Bishop Johannes of Ficcocle, who were the papal legates. The council was presided over by Archbishop Gunther of Cologne and Archbishop Theutgard of Trier, who both later travelled to Rome to inform Pope Nicholas I of their decision.

=== Conclusion ===
As the documents from the council do not survive, we cannot determine exactly what was argued. However, Lothar II was dominant, claiming he was already married to Waldrada, Theutberga was guilty and the decision from the Council of Aachen in 862 should be upheld. The attending bishops signed a document stating that the marriage of Theutberga and Lothar II was annulled, and Lothar was free to remarry. This document was then taken to Rome for Pope Nicholas to ratify, and only then would the judgement be valid.

=== Controversy ===
The decision of the council was against ecclesiastical law, as it was impossible to pass judgement against Theutberga if she was not present. It is not clear if Lothar II threatened or bribed bishops in order for them to sign the concluding document, but these were the same bishops who sided with Lothar in the 862 Council of Aachen. Lothar II was also accused of bribing Archbishop Gunther into helping him establish a scheme to frame Theutberga. Furthermore, the Annals of St Bertin suggest that the papal legates were bribed by Lothar II and did not conduct a full investigation.

== Reaction ==
=== Pope Nicholas I's judgement ===
Pope Nicholas I rejected the ruling of the Council of Metz, condemning it as heretical. Following the council, later in 863, Archbishops Gunther and Theutgard travelled to Rome to present the council's document. Nicholas dismissed the document after consideration, as ‘a great deal in it was found to contain a profane baseness of language …which ensnared those archbishops for their frenzied trespassing beyond their episcopal rank'. Nicholas I concluded that at the council the bishops had not enquired sufficiently into the case and the judgement was too hasty. He stated the council as not being worthy of the name synod and compared it to a brothel.

=== Archbishops Gunther and Theutgard ===
Due to their heretical role in the Council of Metz and presenting Pope Nicholas I with the false document, Archbishops Gunther and Theutgard were excommunicated and deposed from office. Pope Nicholas I also threatened the bishops who had attended the Council of Metz with excommunication, if they did not publicly accept Nicholas' judgement. Nicholas stated that ‘if we see you or them falling away from the rules established in the canons and by the Holy Fathers to favour one party for the sake of a favour from anyone whatsoever… we will not hesitate to pursue the matter'. This sparked controversy, with some arguing that Nicholas acted within his remit, while Archbishops Gunther and Theutgard protested.

== Bibliography ==
- 862, November 23, Letter 3, pp. 268–70 In Paris, Bibliotheque nationale de France, Lat. 1557.
- 863 (early) (a), Letter 10, pp. 275–6 In Paris, Bibliotheque nationale de France, Lat. 1557
- 863 (early) (b), Letter 11, pp. 276–7 In Paris, Bibliotheque nationale de France, Lat. 1557
- 863, c. October 30, Letter 18, pp. 284–6
- Airlie, Stuart, ‘Private bodies and the body politic in the divorce case of Lothar II', Past and Present 161 (1998), pp. 3–38
- Chronicle of Regino of Prüm in: Maclean, S. & Adalbert (2009) History and politics in late Carolingian and Ottonian Europe : the chronicle of Regino of Prüm and Adalbert of Magdeburg, Manchester: Manchester University Press. pp. 139–141
- Hartmann, Wilfried (1998) Die Konzilien der Karolingiche Teilreich 860- 874
- Heidecker, Karl. The Divorce of Lothar II : Christian Marriage and Political Power in the Carolingian World (Conjunctions of Religion & Power in the Medieval Past) Ithaca: Cornell UP, 2010. Print.
- Liber Pontificalis, tr. R. Davis, Lives of the Ninth-Century Popes, pp. 228–9
- Nelson, Janet (1991). The Annals of St-Bertin. Manchester University Press.
- Reuter, Timothy (1992) The Annals of Fulda. Manchester University Press.
