= Theuthild =

Ninth-century abbess of the Remiremont convent in Vosges, France

Abbess Theuthild (or Theuthilde, or Thiathildis) was a ninth-century abbess of the important convent of Remiremont in the Vosges. According to Michele Gaillard, Theuthild was responsible for a process of reform at the convent.

Six of her letters survive, showing her correspondence with Emperor Louis the Pious, the Empress Judith and other high-ranking magnates. The letters are now copied in a ninth-century manuscript in Zurich (Zentralbibliothek Rh. 131). In the letter to Louis, Theuthild declared that she and her sisters had performed 800 masses, and sung the psalter a thousand times, for the sake of his soul and the souls of his family.

She is also associated with the compilation of the Liber Memorialis of Remiremont.

Theuthild is thought to have died around 865.
