= Bosonids =

Medieval European aristocratic family

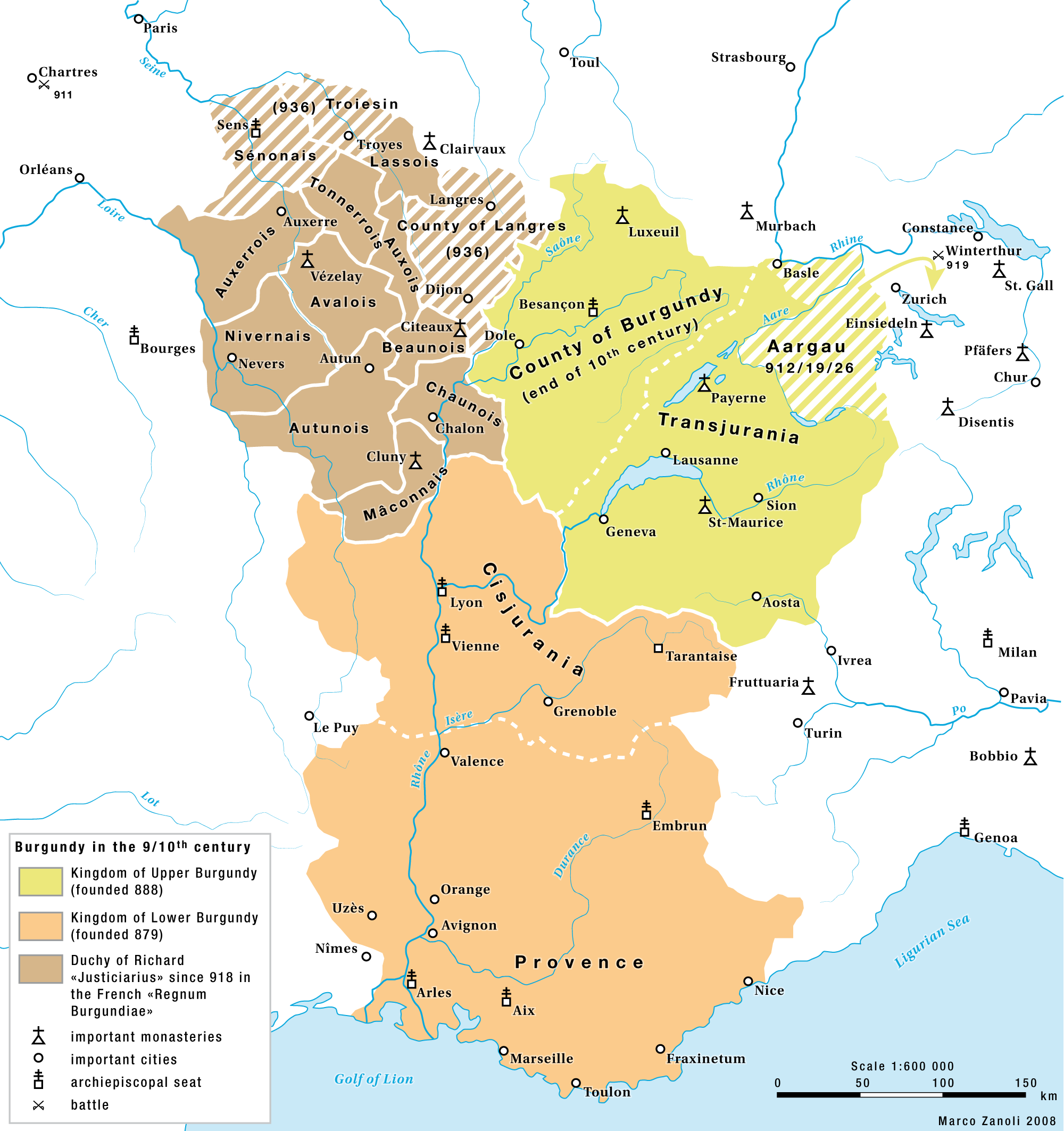
Burgundian and Provancal regions, ruled or claimed by various members of the Bosonid family during the 9th and 10th centuries Lower Burgundy, with Provence Upper Burgundy Duchy of Burgundy

The Bosonids were a dynasty of Carolingian-era counts, dukes, bishops, kings and emperors descended from Boso the Elder and his wife Engeltrude. They married into the Carolingian dynasty and raised to power during the second half of the 9th century, consequently establishing their own rule in various Burgundian regions, including Provence, and also in northern Italy.

The first great scion of the dynasty was Boso, count of Arles and of other Burgundian counties in the mid-9th century. Boso rose in favour as a courtier of Charles the Bald. He was even appointed viceroy in Italy in 875. After the death of Charles' son Louis the Stammerer, Boso refused to recognise Louis' sons Carloman and Louis III as kings of France, and proclaimed himself king of Provence in 879 at Vienne, with the support of the nobility. Boso strove throughout the rest of his life to maintain his title in the face of Emperor Charles the Fat. He died in 887 and was succeeded by his son, Louis the Blind, under the regency of his wife Ermengard, a daughter of the Emperor Louis II.

Louis was adopted by Charles the Fat and legitimised in his royal title. With this legal basis, he sought to take the place of his Carolingian relatives on the imperial and Italian thrones in 900. He was crowned in Pavia and then in Rome, but could not actually hold on to power there.

== Genealogy ==
Bosonids, Bivinids and their relatives, with the names of kings and emperors bolded.

Boso the Elder	Engeltrude
**Louis II of Italy** emperor	Richildis (wife of Bivin of Gorze)	Teutberga queen of Lotharingia	**Lothair II** king of Lotharingia	Waldrada mistress, later wife	Hucbert count of Valois	Boso count in Italy
Ermengard of Italy queen of Provence	**Boso** king of Provence	Richildis empress	Richard the Justiciar duke of Burgundy	Bertha of Lotharingia countess of Arles	Theobald count of Arles
Engelberga	**Louis the Blind** emperor	**Rudolph** king of Western Francia	Hugh the Black	**Hugh of Italy** king of Italy	Boso margrave of Tuscany
Charles Constantine count of Vienne	**Lothair II of Italy** king of Italy	Adelaide of Italy	Hubert duke of Spoleto	Bertha-Eudokia	**Romanos II**; Byzantine emperor	Willa queen of Italy	**Berengar II of Italy** king of Italy
Emma of Italy queen of West Francia	**Lothair of France** king of West Francia	Hugh of Tuscany margrave of Tuscany	**Adalbert of Italy** king of Italy	Rozala of Italy queen of West Francia
**Louis V of France** last Carolingian king of West Francia

== Sources ==
- Bouchard, Constance B. (1988). "The Bosonids or Rising to Power in the Late Carolingian Age". French Historical Studies. 15 (3): 407–431. JSTOR 286367.
- Bouchard, Constance B. (1999). "Burgundy and Provence, 879–1032". The New Cambridge Medieval History. Vol. 3. Cambridge: Cambridge University Press. pp. 328–345.
- Bouchard, Constance B. (2001). Those of My Blood: Creating Noble Families in Medieval Francia. Philadelphia: University of Pennsylvania Press.
- Goldberg, Eric J. (2021). "'A Man of Notable Good Looks Disfigured by a Cruel Wound': The Forest Misadventure of Charles the Young of Aquitaine (864) in History and Legend". In Rutger Kramer; Helmut Reimitz; Graeme Ward (eds.). Historiography and Identity III: Carolingian Approaches. Brepols. pp. 355–386. doi:10.1484/M.CELAMA-EB.5.120170.
- MacLean, Simon (2001). "The Carolingian response to the revolt of Boso, 879–887". French Historical Studies. 10 (1): 21–48.
- MacLean, Simon (2003). Kingship and Politics in the Late Ninth Century: Charles the Fat and the end of the Carolingian Empire. New York: Cambridge University Press.
- McKitterick, Rosamond (1983). The Frankish Kingdoms Under the Carolingians, 751-987. Harlow: Longman.
- Poupardin, René (1901). Le Royaume de Provence sous les Carolingiens, 855–933. Paris: Émile Bouillon.
- Riché, Pierre (1993). The Carolingians: A Family Who Forged Europe. Philadelphia: University of Pennsylvania Press.
