= Pope Benedict III =

Head of the Catholic Church from 855 to 858

- Bishop of Rome
- Papal seal of Pope Benedict III
- Church: Catholic Church
- Papacy began: 29 September 855
- Papacy ended: 17 April 858
- Predecessor: Leo IV
- Successor: Nicholas I

Personal details
- Born: Rome, Papal States
- Died: 17 April 858

Pope Benedict III (Latin: Benedictus III; died 17 April 858) was the bishop of Rome and leader of the Papal States from 29 September 855 to his death on 17 April 858.

== Early career ==
Little is known of Benedict's life before his papacy. His father was named Peter. Benedict was educated and lived in Rome, and was appointed by Pope Leo IV as cardinal-priest of the church of San Callisto. Benedict had a reputation for learning and piety.

== Pontificate ==
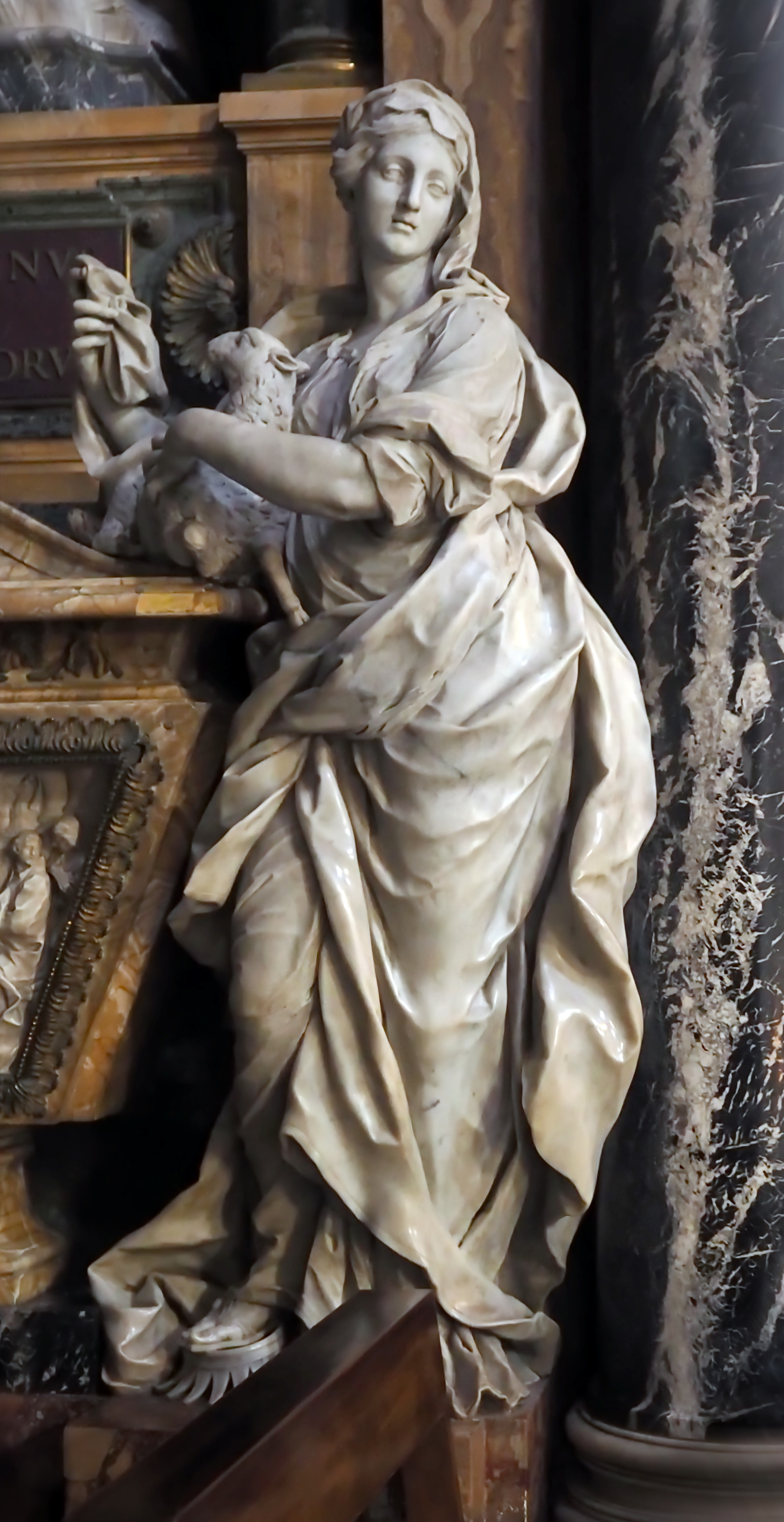
Monument to Benedict III in Santa Maria sopra Minerva

Benedict III was elected upon the refusal of Adrian, the initial choice of the clergy and people. Arsenius, bishop of Orte, intercepted the legates sent to advise the emperor of the election and persuaded them to betray Benedict and convince the emperor name the bishop's nephew Anastasius instead. Anastasius had previously been excommunicated by Leo IV. The legates returned with the imperial envoys and had Benedict's election disavowed and Anastasius installed. Anastasius took his place at the Lateran and Benedict was imprisoned. However, local popular opinion was so strong that the Franks recognized Benedict's consecration. Benedict treated Anastasius and his adherents leniently. The schism helped to weaken the hold of the emperors upon the popes, especially upon their elections.

Benedict intervened in the conflict between Lothair II of Lotharingia, Louis II of Italy, and Charles of Provence on the death of their father, Emperor Lothair I. He wrote to the Frankish bishops, rebuking them for remaining silent in the face of the disorder affecting the Carolingian realms.

Æthelwulf of Wessex and his son, the future king Alfred the Great, visited Rome in Benedict's reign. The Schola Anglorum, which was destroyed by fire in 847, was restored by Benedict.

A medieval tradition claimed that Pope Joan, a woman disguised as a man, was Benedict's immediate predecessor. The legendary Joan is generally believed to be fictitious.

== Sources ==
- Encyclopædia Britannica, 9th edition (1880s)
- Baix, F. (1935). "Benoît III pape", in: Dictionnaire d'histoire et de géographie ecclésiastiques, VIII (Paris 1935), pp 14–27. (in French)
- Cheetham, Nicolas, Keepers of the Keys, New York: Charles Scribner's Sons, 1983. ISBN 0-684-17863-X
- Davis, Raymond (1995). The Lives of the Ninth-century Popes (Liber Pontificalis): The Ancient Biographies of Ten Popes from A.D. 817-891. Liverpool University Press. pp. 161–188. ISBN 978-0-85323-479-1.
- Duchesne, Louis (1892). Le Liber Pontificalis (in Latin and French). Vol. Tome II. Paris: E. Thorin. pp. 140–150.
- Gregorovius, Ferdinand (1903). Hamilton, Annie (ed.). History of the City of Rome in the Middle Ages. Vol. III (second revised ed.). London: G. Bell & sons. pp. 115–120.
- Mann, Horace Kinder (1906). The Lives of the Popes in the Early Middle Ages. Vol. II. London: K. Paul, Trench, Trübner. pp. 308–328.

Catholic Church titles
Preceded by Leo IV	Pope; 855–858	Succeeded by Nicholas I
