= Hincmar =

Archbishop of Reims

Saint Hincmar
- Archbishop of Reims
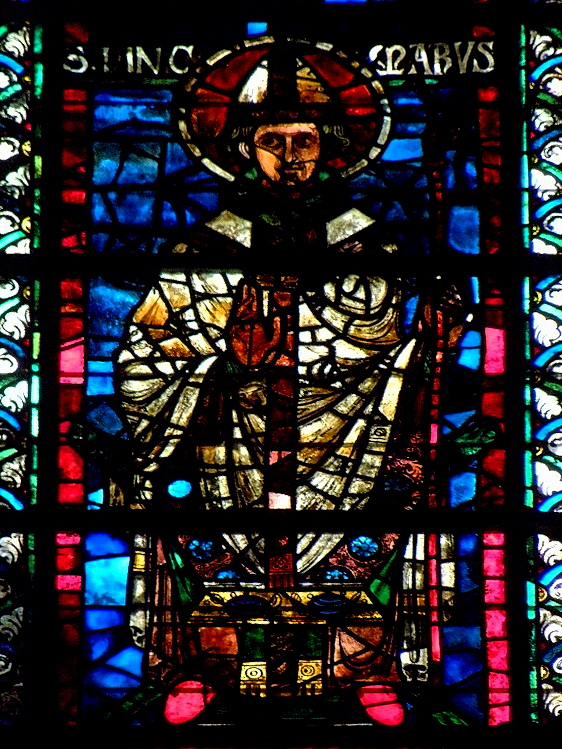
- Representation of Hincmar on a stained glass window in the Saint-Remi basilica of Reims.
- Archdiocese: Reims
- In office: 845-882
- Predecessor: Ebbo
- Successor: Fulk the Venerable

Orders
- Ordination: 845 by Council of Beauvais
- Consecration: 3 May 845 by Wenilo of Sens

Personal details
- Born: 806
- Died: 21 December 882
- Buried: Basilica of Saint-Remi

Sainthood
- Feast day: 21 December; 5 March
- Venerated in: Catholic Church (Benedictines)
- Title as Saint: Archbishop, Monk

Hincmar (/ˈhɪŋkmɑːr/; French: [ɛ̃kmaʁ]; Latin: Hincmarus; 806 – 21 December 882), archbishop of Reims, was a Frankish jurist and theologian, as well as the friend, advisor and propagandist of Charles the Bald. He belonged to a noble family of northern Francia.

== Biography ==
=== Early life ===
Hincmar was born in 806 to a distinguished family of the West Franks. Destined to the monastic life, he was brought up at Saint-Denis under the direction of the abbot Hilduin (died 844), who, when appointed court chaplain in 822, brought him to the court of the emperor Louis the Pious. There he became acquainted with the political as well as the ecclesiastical administration of the empire. When Hilduin was disgraced in 830 for having joined the party of Lothair I, Hincmar accompanied him into exile at Corvey in Saxony. Hincmar used his influence with the emperor on behalf of the banished abbot, and not without success: for he stood in high favour with Louis the Pious, having always been a faithful and loyal adherent. He returned with Hilduin to Saint-Denis when the abbot was reconciled with the emperor and remained faithful to the Louis during his struggle with his sons.

=== 840–877: reign of Charles the Bald ===
After the death of Louis the Pious (840) Hincmar supported Charles the Bald (see Capitularies of Charles the Bald), and received from him the abbacies of Nôtre-Dame at Compiègne and Saint-Germer-de-Fly.

==== Archbishop of Reims (845) ====
Archbishop Ebbo had been deposed in 835 at the synod of Thionville (Diedenhofen) for having broken his oath of fidelity to the emperor Louis, whom he had deserted to join the party of Lothair. After the death of Louis, Ebbo succeeded in regaining possession of his see for some years (840-844), but in 844 Pope Sergius II confirmed his deposition. In 845 Hincmar obtained through the king's support the archbishopric of Reims, and this choice was confirmed at the Synod of Beauvais (April 845). He was consecrated archbishop on 3 May 845; in 847 Pope Leo IV sent him the pallium.

One of the first cares of the new prelate was the restitution to his metropolitan see of the domains that had been alienated under Ebbo and given as benefices to laymen. From the beginning of his episcopate Hincmar was in constant conflict with the clerks who had been ordained by Ebbo during his reappearance. These clerks, whose ordination was regarded as invalid by Hincmar and his adherents, were condemned in 853 at the Council of Soissons, and the decisions of that council were confirmed in 855 by Pope Benedict III. This conflict, however, bred an antagonism of which Hincmar was later to feel the effects.

During the next thirty years the archbishop of Reims played a very prominent part in church and state. His authoritative and energetic will inspired, and in great measure directed, the policy of the West Frankish kingdom until his death. When Louis the German invaded the kingdom in 858, Hincmar played a decisive role in marshalling the West Frankish bishops again the invasion, holding an episcopal council at Quierzy that issued a letter criticising Louis, which contributed to Louis' withdrawal.

As a participant in government and court ceremony and an aggressive advocate of ecclesiastical privilege, Hincmar took an active part in all the great political and religious affairs of his time, and was especially energetic in defending and extending the rights of the church and of the metropolitans in general, and of his own metropolitan of the church of Reims in particular. In the resulting conflicts, in which his personal interest was in question, he displayed great activity and a wide knowledge of canon law, but was not so scrupulous that he would not resort to disingenuous interpretation of texts.

==== Gottschalk and predestinarianism ====
His first encounter was with Gottschalk, whose predestinarian doctrines claimed to be modelled on those of St Augustine. Hincmar placed himself at the head of the party that regarded Gottschalk's doctrines as heretical, and succeeded in procuring the arrest and imprisonment of his adversary (849). For a part at least of his doctrines Gottschalk found ardent defenders, such as Lupus of Ferrières, Prudentius of Troyes, the deacon Florus, and Amolo of Lyons. Through the energy and activity of Hincmar the theories of Gottschalk were condemned at the second council of Quierzy (853) and Valence (855), and the decisions of these two synods were confirmed at the synods of Langres and Savonnières, near Toul (859).

To refute the predestinarian heresy, Hincmar composed his De praedestinatione Dei et libero arbitrio, and against certain propositions advanced by Gottschalk on the Trinity he wrote a treatise called De una et non trina deitate. Gottschalk died in prison in 868.

==== Lothar II of Lorraine ====
The question of the divorce of Lothair II, king of Lorraine (r. 855–869), who had repudiated his wife Theutberga to marry his concubine Waldrada, engaged Hincmar's literary activities in another direction. At the request of a number of great personages in Lorraine he composed in 860 his De divortio Lotharii regis et Theutbergae reginae, in which he vigorously attacked, both from the moral and the legal standpoints, the condemnation pronounced against the queen by the Synod of Aix-la-Chapelle (February 860). He was probably responsible for drafting the letter promulgated by Charles at the Council of Savonnières in 862 which strongly condemned Lothar II.

Hincmar energetically supported the policy of Charles the Bald in Lorraine, less perhaps from devotion to the king's interests than from a desire to see the whole of the ecclesiastical province of Reims united under the authority of a single, sympathetic sovereign, and in 869 it was he who consecrated Charles at Metz as king of Lorraine.

==== Episcopal conflicts ====
In the middle of the ninth century there appeared in Gaul the collection of 'false decretals' commonly known as the Pseudo-Isidorian Decretals. The exact date and the circumstances of the composition of the collection are still an open question, but it is certain that Hincmar was one of the first to know of their existence, and apparently he was not aware that the documents were forged. The importance assigned by these decretals to the bishops and the provincial councils, as well as to the direct intervention of the Holy See, tended to curtail the rights of the metropolitans.

Rothad, bishop of Soissons, one of the most active members of the party in favour of the pseudo-Isidorian theories, immediately came into collision with his archbishop. Deposed in 863 at the council of Soissons that was presided over by Hincmar, Rothad appealed to Rome. Pope Nicholas I, supported him zealously, and in 865, in spite of the protests of the archbishop of Reims, Arsenius, bishop of Orte and legate of the Holy See, was instructed to restore Rothad to his episcopal see.

Hincmar experienced another check when he endeavoured to prevent Wulfad, one of the deposed clerics ordained by Ebbo, from obtaining the archbishopric of Bourges with the support of Charles the Bald. After a synod held at Soissons, Pope Nicholas I pronounced himself in favour of the deposed clerics, and Hincmar was constrained to submit (866).

He was more successful in his contest with his nephew Hincmar, bishop of Laon, who was at first supported both by the king and by his uncle, the archbishop of Reims, but soon quarrelled with both. Hincmar of Laon refused to recognize the authority of his metropolitan, and entered into an open struggle with his uncle, who exposed his errors in a treatise called Opusculum LV capitulorum, and procured his condemnation and deposition at the Synod of Douzy (871). The bishop of Laon was sent into exile, probably to Aquitaine, where his eyes were put out by order of Count Boso. Pope Adrian protested against his deposition, but it was confirmed in 876 by Pope John VIII, and it was not until 878, at the council of Troyes, that the unfortunate prelate was reconciled with the Church.

A serious conflict arose between archbishop Hincmar on the one side and Charles and the pope on the other in 876, when Pope John VIII, at the king's request, entrusted Ansegisus, archbishop of Sens, with the primacy of the Gauls and of Germany, and created him vicar apostolic. In Hincmar's eyes this was an encroachment on the jurisdiction of the archbishops, and it was against this primacy that he directed his treatise De iure metropolitanorum. At the same time he wrote a life of St Remigius, in which he endeavoured by audacious falsifications to prove the supremacy of the church of Reims over the other churches. Charles the Bald, however, upheld the rights of Ansegisus at the synod of Ponthion.

=== 877–882: reigns of Louis the Stammerer, Louis III and Carloman ===
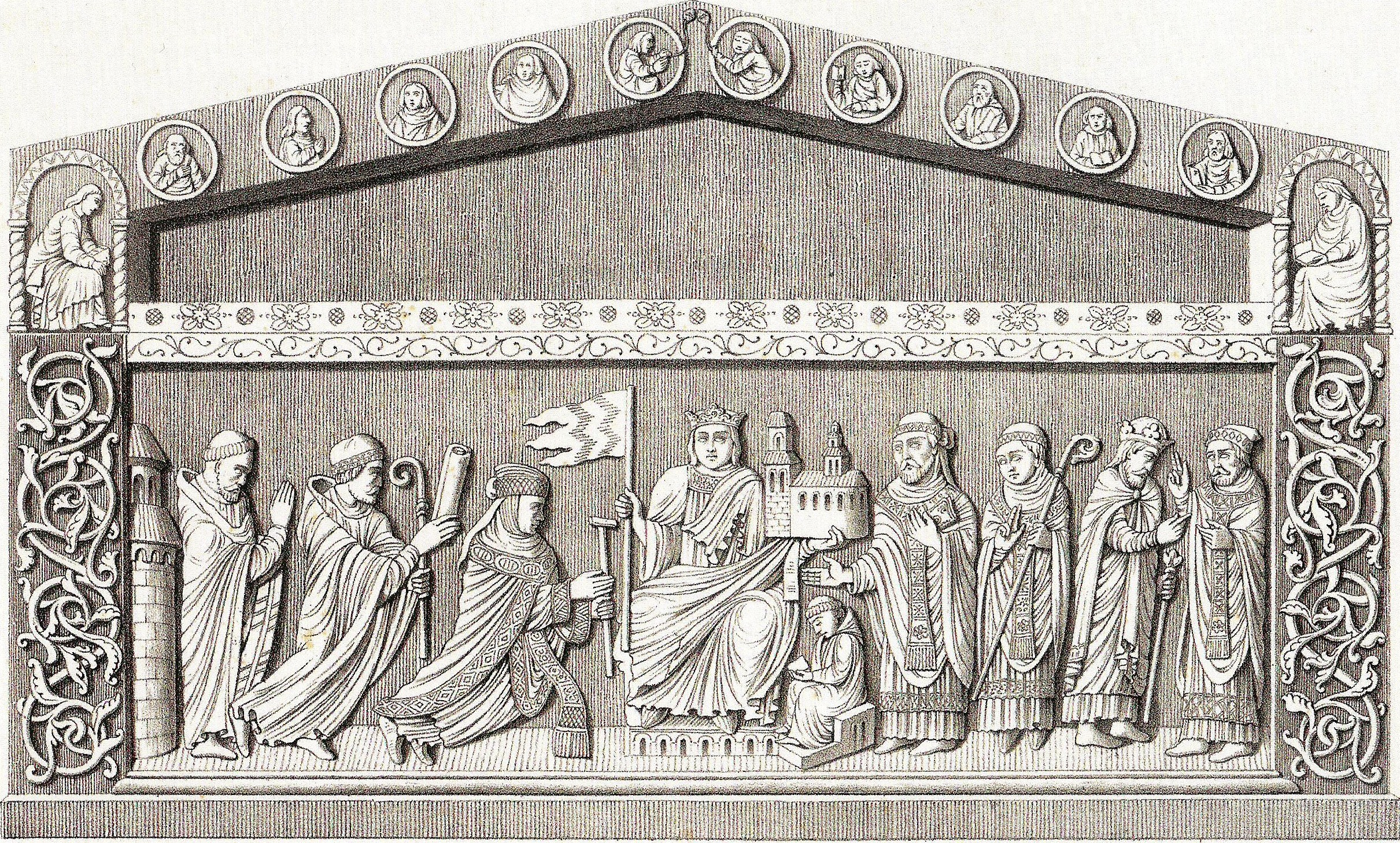
Relief from Hincmar's tomb, destroyed in 1793.

Although Hincmar had been very hostile to Charles' expedition into Italy, he figured among his testamentary executors and helped to secure the submission of the nobles to Louis the Stammerer, whom he crowned at Compiègne (December 8, 877). During the reign of Louis, Hincmar played an obscure part. He supported the accession of Louis III and Carloman, but had a dispute with Louis, who wished to install a candidate in the episcopal see of Beauvais without the archbishop's assent.

To Carloman, on his accession in 882, Hincmar addressed his De ordine palatii, partly based on a treatise (now lost) by Adalard, abbot of Corbie (c. 814), in which he set forth his system of government and his opinion of the duties of a sovereign, a subject he had already touched in his De regis persona et regio ministerio, dedicated to Charles the Bald at an unknown date, and in his Instructio ad Ludovicum regem, addressed to Louis the Stammerer on his accession in 877. In the autumn of 882 an irruption of the Normans forced the old archbishop to take refuge at Épernay, where he died on 21 December 882.

== Works ==
Hincmar was a prolific writer. Besides the works already mentioned, he was the author of several theological tracts; of the De villa Noviliaco, concerning the claiming of a domain of his church; and he continued from 861 the Annales Bertiniani, of which the first part was written by Prudentius, bishop of Troyes, the best source for the history of Charles the Bald. He also wrote a great number of letters, some of which are extant, and others embodied in the chronicles of Flodoard.

Hincmar's works, which are the principal source for the history of his life, were collected by Jacques Sirmond (Paris, 1645), and reprinted by Migne, Patrol. Latina, vol. cxxv and cxxvi. See also Carl von Noorden, Hinkmar, Erzbischof von Reims (Bonn, 1863), and, especially, Heinrich Schrörs', Hinkmar, Erzbischof von Reims (Freiburg im Breisgau, 1884). For Hincmar's political and ecclesiastical theories see preface to Maurice Prou's edition of the De ordine palatii (Paris, 1885), and the abbé Émile Lesne, La hiérarchie épiscopale en Gaule et en Germanie (Paris, 1905).

Hincmar may be the author of the anonymous Gesta Dagoberti, a biography of Dagobert I written in the early 830s.

In one of his letters Hincmar recommended that a copy of Gregory the Great's work called Pastoral Care should be given together with the Book of Canons into the hands of bishops before the altar at their consecration (Schaff).

== Veneration ==
Hincmar is venerated in Catholic Church:

- 21 December – main date, (death anniversary),
- 5 March – commemoration in Benedictine Order calendar.

== Bibliography ==
- De divortio Lotharii regis et Theutbergae reginae

Translations

- Rachel Stone and Charles West, tr., The Divorce of King Lothar and Queen Theutberga: Hincmar of Rheims's De Divortio (Manchester, 2016)
- Throop, Priscilla, trans., Hincmar of Rheims: On Kingship, Divorce, Virtues and Vices (Charlotte, VT: MedievalMS, 2014) an English translation of De regis persona et regio ministerio, ad Carolum Calvum regem; De cavendis vitiis et virtutibus exercendis, ad Carolum Calvum regem; De divortio Lotharii regis et Theutbergae reginae; Ad proceres regni, pro institutione Carlomanni regis, et de ordine palatii.

Catholic Church titles
Preceded by Ebbo	Archbishop of Rheims; 845–882	Succeeded by Fulk the Venerable
