= Adalbert Ebner =

German Catholic priest and liturgist

Adalbert Ebner (16 December 1861 – 25 February 1898) was a German Catholic priest and liturgist born in Straubing, in the Kingdom of Bavaria.

Ebner received his ordination in 1886 at Regensburg, mostly likely by Bishop Ignatius von Senestrey, where he subsequently served as vicar at the Alten Kapelle (Old Chapel). From 1892 he was docent of patrology, Christian archaeology and liturgy at the Catholic University in Eichstätt. At Eichstätt he also served at the local cathedral from 1892 until his death in 1898, at the age of 36.

Ebner specialized in researching ancient Liturgical books. He was the author of a scholarly monograph on the history of the Roman Missal, titled Quellen und Forschungen zur Geschichte und Kunstgeschichte des Missale Romanum im Mittelalter (Resources and Research involving History and Art History of the Roman Missal during the Middle Ages (1896). Other works by Ebner include:

- Die klösterlichen Gebets-Verbrüderungen bis zum Ausgange deskarolingischen Zeitalters. Eine kirchengeschichtliche Studie (1890).
- Über die gegenwärtigen Aufgaben und Ziele der liturgisch-historischenForschung (1898).

== External sources ==
- "Eichstatt Fakultaeten, Biography in German" (PDF). Archived from the original (PDF) on 2007-12-16.
- The Catholic Encyclopedia, Missals
