= Boso the Elder =

Frankish nobleman

Boson the Elder
- Born: c. 800
- Died: c. 855
- Children: Boso, Teutberga, wife of Bivin, Hucbert
- Family: Bosonids

Boso (or Boson) "the Elder" (c. 800 – 855) was a Frank of the Bosonid dynasty, Count in Italy.

== Family and issue ==
He was married to Engeltrude. They had the following issue:

- Boso, Count of Valois (d. 874)
- Teutberga (d. before November 25, 875), married Lothair II
- A daughter (unknown name) who married Bivin of Gorze
- Hucbert, Count of Valois, lay abbot of St. Maurice's Abbey (820–864)
