= Lothair II =

King of Lotharingia from 855 to 869

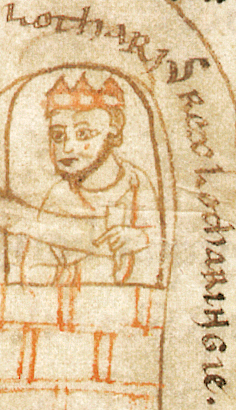
- Lothair from a 12th-century manuscript

King of Lotharingia
- Reign: 855–869
- Predecessor: Lothair I
- Successor: Charles the Bald
- Born: 837
- Died: 7 August 869; Piacenza
- Burial: Basilica of Sant'Antonino
- Spouse: Teutberga; Waldrada
- Issue more...: Hugh, Duke of Alsace; Bertha
- Dynasty: Carolingian
- Father: Lothair I
- Mother: Ermengarde of Tours

Lothair II (Note: His name is also spelled also spelled Lothar and Lothaire) (c. 837 — 7 August 869) was the king of Lotharingia from 855 until his death. He is known for his over ten-year-long divorce case with his wife Teutberga so that he could remarry his long-standing lover Waldrada. Lothair began a relationship with Waldrada in his adolescence. By the time of his accession in September 855, he seems to have still loved her. However, the king was forced to marry Teutberga of the Bosonids and ally with her brother Hucbert to maintain his position. Lothair put away Teutberga as Hucbert's importance waned, but after she passed a trial by ordeal he was forced to take her back. Hucbert died in revolt in 864 after being replaced in Lothair's court.

In 858, Louis the German unsuccessfully invaded West Francia, but Lothair helped negotiate a peace between Louis and Charles the Bald by June 860. He was able to act as a mediator between his kingly uncles. Lothair convened his first council at Aachen in that year, in which he was divorced from Teutberga. Charles broke the peace in 861, but by 862 Lothair had allied with Louis the German and again held the upper hand. Lothair convened the second Aachen council in that year which allowed him to marry Waldrada and made peace with Charles in November. Lothair's brother, Charles of Provence died in 863 and Lothair partitioned Lower Burgundy with his elder brother, Emperor Louis. Pope Nicholas I suddenly undermined Lothair's position and excommunicated two of his archbishops, and some Lotharingian bishops sought the pope's forgiveness. Nicholas was able to force Lothair to remarry Teutberga by 865. In 867, Nicholas died, and his successor Adrian II was more flexible. Lothair went to Rome in 869 to meet with him, but died on the return trip.

Lothair issued less coinage than his father and significantly fewer charters than Charles the Bald, although his chancery remained functional. Lothair's dealings with the Northmen were focused on Rorik of Dorestad, a Viking leader in Frisia. In 863, Lothair attacked and chased a Norse raiding party, but did not destroy them. Lothair won a significant victory against Rorik in 867 and inflicted heavy casualties.

== Ancestry ==
Lothair's grandfather was Louis the Pious, who has been crowned as emperor by his father, Charlemagne, in 813. In 817, at Aachen, Louis crowned his eldest son Lothair I co-emperor and heir to the Carolingian Empire. Louis' planned division of the empire became impossible after the birth of his youngest son, Charles the Bald, and conflict between father and sons began in 829. Lothair and his brothers, Pepin and Louis the German, ambushed Louis and took over the imperial government. Pepin and Louis the German were promised a larger share of the inheritance, and thus turned on Lothair, ending the revolt.

A second revolt broke out in 833, prompted by Louis taking Aquitaine from Pepin and granting it to Charles. Lothair turned his father's supporters away from him and took over the government, capturing Louis, his wife Judith, and Charles. Infighting broke out amongst Lothair's supporters, allowing him to be deposed and the emperor to be freed. Lothair and his men defeated Louis' supporters, led by Wido, who had been dispatched to drive them out from the Breton March. Shortly afterwards, Lothair captured Châlons, but before making more progress he was defeated by the emperor with Louis the German in battle and forced to make peace.

Conflicts between father and son recommenced from 837 to 839, although Lothair remained loyal, and they were quickly defeated. After Louis' death in 840, a civil war broke out between the sons. In 841, Louis was defeated at the Battle of Fontenoy, but by 843, at the Treaty of Verdun, peace was signed. Lothair married Ermengarde of Tours in 821, and with her he had three sons. The eldest was, Louis II, born around 825. About a decade later came Lothair II, and the third son was Charles of Provence. According to a later, possibly erroneous account written by Bishop Adventius of Metz, Lothair II had been wed by his father to Waldrada in the early 850s.

== Early reign ==
=== Treaties of Prüm and Orbe ===
Mortally ill, Lothair's father, Lothair I, divided his realm between his sons. Louis II, the eldest, held Italy and the imperial title since 850; Lothair II, about 18 years old, was given Lothair I's territory between Frisia and the Alps, while Charles, still a child, received Lower Burgundy. Lothair I died on 19 September. The young Lothair initially had custody of his brother Charles. Lothair was brought by his magnates to the court of his uncle, Louis the German, at Frankfurt, so that Louis could confirm him as king. In exchange, he probably ceded Alsace to Louis, in expectation that the young Charles could be made to step aside. In the event, this did not happen and Louis did not permanently acquire Alsace.

Although confirmed by Louis, Lothair's position was still insecure, and to establish himself as king he was forced to marry the daughter of Boso the Elder, Teutberga, securing the support of her brother Hucbert. The Bosonids and their relations were part of a ruling class which held connections and properties throughout the whole Frankish world whose families commanded great wealth, enough to present a danger to kings and transfer their support. For Lothair, he could not yet act independently. Lothair nearly came to blows with his brother Louis, but with the intervention of the magnates Lothair I's division was maintained at the Treaty of Orbe and by late 856 Lothair was more well-established. His accession was confirmed by the king's anointment. Rabanus Maurus, the archbishop of Mainz, wrote for Lothair at his accession a moral and military treatise, De procinctu romanae miliciae, tailored to his young age.

=== Marriage issue and Hucbert's revolt ===
Division of the Carolingian Empire under the Treaty of Prüm (855)

At his accession Lothair had already had multiple children by his boyhood mistress, Waldrada, whom he seems to have still loved. Hucbert's position declined; not only was he considered a "violent, aggressive, and sexually debauched individual," but after the Treaty of Orbe his strategic usefuleness and political value diminished greatly. By late 856, Hucbert's standing at court was already waning. Lothair renewed his alliance with Charles the Bald in March 857, and in the same year he dismissed Teutberga. Around the early summer of 858, with the agreement of the clergy and the nobility, Lothair subjected Teutberga to a trial by ordeal. She was allowed to pick a champion whose mission it was to pick an object out of boiling water, after which his hand would then be bandaged. A few days later the bandages were removed and the hand was deemed "uncooked," that is healing normally, and Teutberga was found not guilty. As a result, Lothair was forced by his magnates to take her back, "but he does not admit her to his bed and treats her as a prisoner."

Lothair's visit to West Francia in August, where he assisted Charles in besieging a group of Northmen, may have been partly to shore up support after the humiliation. Around that same time, Louis the German suddenly invaded West Francia, encouraged by West Francian opponents of Charles the Bald. Charles was caught unawares and forced to flee, and, at Attigny, Louis issued a charter dated to the first year of his in West Francia rule on 7 December. Lothair hurried to the palace and recognized Louis as king, but without the support of the West Frankish bishops, led by Archbishop Hincmar of Reims, Louis was forced to return to East Francia. Just as quickly, Lothair renewed his alliance with Charles. Taking advantage of their need for his support, Lothair became a mediator between his uncles. In doing so, he helped facilitate an equal peace between them at Koblenz in June 860.

Without the support of the powerful Hucbert, Lothair appealed to the family of his mother, Ermengarde of Tours, whose brother Liutfrid, as an Etichonid, held lands in Alsace and Italy. Liutfrid's position near the centre of power was compromised by Lothair's marriage to Teutberga, and the king could count on his support in ending their marriage. There was also a noble named Walther (or Walter), who was a trusted councillor of Lothair. Close clerical supporters of Lothair included Adventius, Bishop of Metz and Gunther, Archbishop of Cologne. Hucbert revolted during this time, and in 859, Lothair granted Hucbert's territories to Louis of Italy in exchange for his support. Louis gave the territory to his cousin, Conrad, who in 864 finally killed Hucbert.

=== First Council of Aachen ===
In 860, Lothair summoned a small council at Aachen with Archbishops Gunther of Cologne and Theutgaud of Trier, Bishops Franco of Liège and Adventius of Metz, Abbots Heigel of Prüm and Odelingus of Inden, and a few other, close but unnamed supporters of the king. He then brings Teutberga, who confesses to committing incest with Hucbert and declares, according to the bishops, that she is unworthy to remain married. Despite being questioned repeatedly, she remained "steadfastly in her confession." In their contemporary address to Archbishop Hincmar, the Lotharingian bishops recounted Teutberga's confession as such:

(Chapter 6.) “With God and my conscience as my witnesses”, she said, “and my confessor also as a witness, I shall stray neither to the right nor to the left in any respect in what I say and confess about myself, saying nothing except what is truthful. I recognise and know this about myself”, she said, “I am not worthy to remain in the marital bond (coniugalis copula). And I present to you here as a witness this bishop Gunther, to whom I have confessed. He knows that I am not worthy.” And she turned to this bishop, and pleading, said, “I ask, bishop, that you make your co-brothers understand, as you know best, that the matter is just as I bore witness about myself.”

The bishop replied to her, “It would be good”, he said, “that you yourself should reveal to my co-brothers what still remains hidden, so that they might hear what they should judge upon from your own lips.” But she said, “What need is there that I should say anything other than what you know? For the sake of God, you do it, you tell them my necessity, so that all of you, together with my lord (senior) [Lothar], might give me permission to do what I want to. Since even for the whole world, I am unwilling to lose my soul [Mark 8:36]. And so I ask you, for the sake of God and the ministry which you took on, do not deny what I demand for the salvation of my soul.”

(Chapter 7.) Then we bishops asked as a test, whether if her request were to be granted, she would later make some complaint or prepare a trap. To this she replied without constraint: “Through the faith which I nourish, I promise to you in the presence of God that I shall never in eternity make an accusation, either directly or through any cunning.”

(Chapter 8.) What we finally learned from our co-brother [Gunther] about this matter, while he grieved, anguished, lamented and sorrowed greatly that he had ever been aware of this confession, these things we shall tell our brothers and co-bishops face to face, according to the licence given us. So that, as we said in the beginning, they might understand the evidence (argumenta) of this hitherto hidden matter, and then everyone, with one counsel and agreement, might dispel error and raise up truth.

The Annales Bertiniani asserted without hedging that Lothair coerced Teutberga into the confession:

Lothar hated his queen, Theutberga, with irreconcilable loathing, and after wearing her down with many acts of hostility, he finally forced her to confess before bishops that she had had sodomite intercourse with her brother Hubert. For this crime, she was immediately condemned to penance and shut away in a convent.

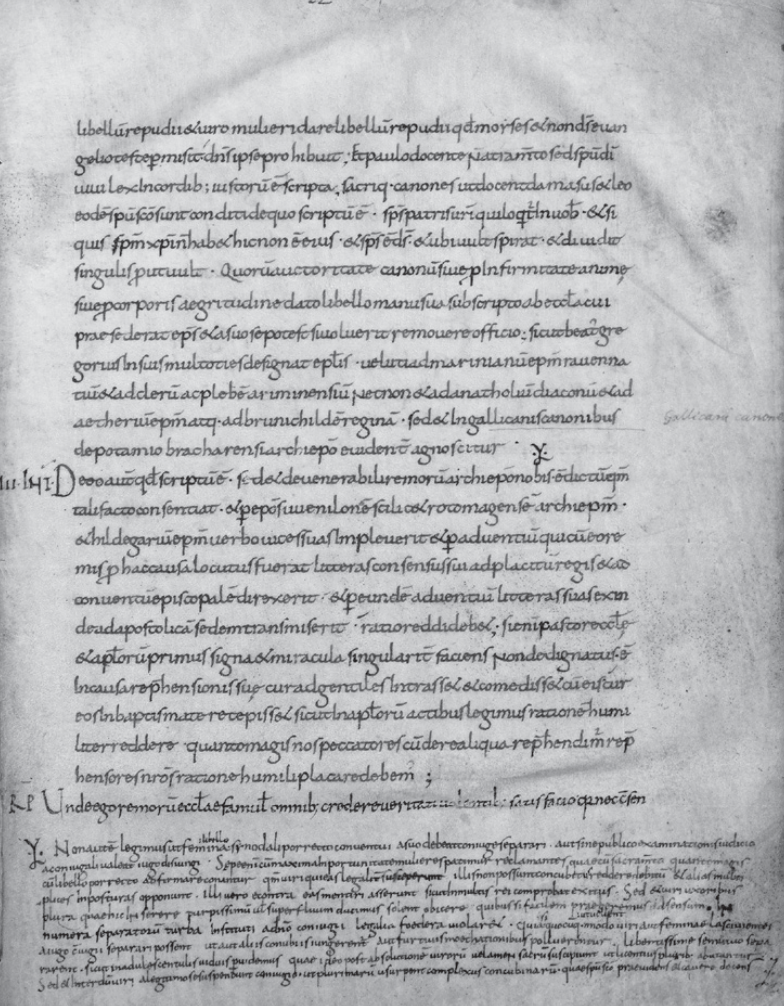
A folio from Hincmar of Reims' De divortio Lotharii regis et Theutbergae reginae

Further, not all in Lotharingia supported the council; possibly due to the 860 council, Heigel of Prüm defected to Charles the Bald, who rewarded him with the abbey of Flavigny, and later made him archbishop of Sens. Teutberga fled to Charles as well, likely having to escape, or alternatively having been let go by Lothair, as she was no longer important. An intentionally anonymous–and importantly unconvinced by Lothair–aristocratic party from Lotharingia canvassed a number of bishops for their opinions on the matter, and one of those to respond, partially to secure his own position, was Hincmar of Reims. As part of their aforementioned address to Hincmar, the bishops posited to him a booklet of questions. He wrote his response, the De divortio Lotharii regis et Theutbergae reginae, around February to April in the first part. Seven more questions were sent individually in response, and around August to October, Hincmar wrote the second part of his De divortio in response to these. The final product was neither fully for, nor against, Lothair.

=== Second council and marriage to Waldrada ===
Immediately after finding safety, Teutberga and her family retracted her confession and appealed to Pope Nicholas I. Two of Lothair's bishops also travel to Rome to refute "malicious lies" about Lothair and attain papal approval for the divorce. With his relationship with Charles the Bald cooling, Lothair formed an alliance with Louis the German. Louis' eldest son, Carloman, rebelled against his father, and his relations lost their lands in East Francia and Lotharingia, forcing Carloman's supporters to seek shelter with Charles. With a considerably larger body of aristocratic supporters, Charles felt confident to try and conquer Lower Burgundy, still ruled by the young and epileptic Charles of Provence. This broke the peace between the three kings. Lothair met with Louis in person and the two kings composed a letter to the Pope asking him to rebuke Charles the Bald.

A record of the meeting survives in the Liber Memorialis of Remiremont, dated to December 861. It kept a list of names at the meeting. The first two, Domnus Lotharius rex and Domnus Hludovicus rex, are thought to be the "lord king Lothair" and "lord king Louis" respectively. After a gap, another list of names follows: Bertra, Rotrude, Hugh, Emma, Waldrada, Doda, Ermengard, and another Ermengard. Not all these names can be exactly identified, but it shows that Lothair brought with him Waldrada and their son Hugh. A list of 50 or so men's names follows, among them Walter, likely the same supporter of Lothair.

The situation suddenly turned in 862; Carloman and Louis reconciled, while Charles' daughter Judith eloped with Baldwin of Flanders. The occidental king exiled the couple, forcing them to seek refuge with Lothair. Charles' sons Louis the Stammerer and Charles the Child also married without the approval of their father, causing a falling out. The Second Council of Aachen assembled on 29 April 862, before the reply of the Papacy, which was now encumbered by multiple requests. Lothair adopted a similarly penitential attitude to the first council, pleading with all the assembled bishops of the realm as a young man separated from his wife and unable to practice celibacy, and begging for permission to remarry. As expected, the bishops gave their assent. Lothair's plea is recorded in a text labeled The Booklet of Complaint:

For you know that I was brought up from infancy and childhood among women, and that I desired to reach the harbor of legitimate marriage, for the good of chastity and to avoid the wickedness of indecency. I am not unaware that whatever goes beyond licit union should be considered the wickedness of fornication and harmful pollution. I know that a concubine is not a wife, and I do not wish to have what is illicit, but what is licit.

You therefore, mindful of my youth, consider what I should do, to whom neither is a wife conceded, nor a concubine permitted. It is known to you that the Apostle says, I wish the younger ones to marry, to procreate children [1 Tim. 5:14]. And Who cannot contain himself, let him marry. For it is better to marry than to burn [1 Cor. 7:9]. And again, Let everyone have his own wife for fear of fornication [1 Cor. 7:2]. And the Apostle Matthew: “God blessed marriage, and permitted love to rule in the bodies of men.”

Therefore I speak straightforwardly, and I confess that I am not at all able to endure without any conjugal union. And in truth I wish to be separated from all fornication according to the inward man [Romans 7:22]. And now, my dearest ones, we suppliantly beg your Sanctity and beg for the love of Him who redeemed us, that in the kindness of love and devoted fidelity, you will not delay from coming to the aid of our body and soul in peril, for the utility of the holy church of God and the kingdom committed to us: so that we may equally rejoice and exult in the Lord, both in our prosperity and in our most prompt devotion toward you.

The Lotharingian bishops, particularly the accounts of Adventius and Gunthar, argued for their decision that the status of women and men were different, and thus though women were not allowed to remarry after putting away their husband, a man who did so because of adultery could. Lothair married Waldrada, but a lengthy treatise on marriage was written in response to the council which dismantled its arguments. It asserted that Lothair was not allowed to remarry even after putting away his wife for fornication, and further that as the incest was done before Lothair and Teutberga's marriage, he had no case against her. Another dissenter was Hincmar, who maintained that though Lothair could remarry if the case against Teutberga was established, it was not done so in a proper manner. The correspondences of his councillors show that Lothair for a moment considered a private confession around February 863, but ultimately regained his confidence.

Lothair and Louis the German met with Charles at the Summit of Savonnières in November of 862, where each king promised to maintain the peace as established at Koblenz in 860. Charles read out his grievances against Lothair to a small circle of West Frankish nobles, but was prevented from doing so to a wider assembly. After this and promising to redress these issues, Lothair, due to the aid of Louis, was able to secure a kiss of peace.

== Later years ==
=== Death of Charles ===
Expansion of Lothar's domains in 863

Lothair's brother Charles died on 24 January 863 after a prolonged illness, and Charles' handlers had made Lothair his heir since 858. However, Emperor Louis contested this succession plan, and as a result both kings invaded Provence, seeking to occupy it and win over its magnates as quickly as possible. Ultimately a partition took place where Lothair received the Lyonnais and the Viennois, and lordship over Gerard of Roussillon, who continued to govern for Lothair. In May, Lothair publicly honored Charles' memory by making a donation to the convent of St. Pierre in Lyon. In the diploma, Waldrada is listed alongside Lothair and his wife, and their son Hugh's presence demonstrates that he was being groomed as heir. To historian Charles West, the incident acts as a high-point in Lothair’s reign, where things seemed to have been going his way, and when he held confidence that the issue of his marriage was mostly resolved.

=== Papal opposition ===
In June of 863, Lothair hosted a synod at Metz. He was joined by his bishops and two papal legates, Bishops Radoald of Porto and John of Cervia. Nicholas had sent them intending that they would judge Lothair, but he managed to attain their consent to his marriage with Waldrada. To confirm the decision, Archbishops Gunthar and Theutagaud were sent to Rome. The acts of the council do not survive, but the bishops may have commanded Lothair to restore church and monastic lands in exchange that they confirm his marriage. This probably prompted Adventius of Metz to oversee the restoration of Gorze Abbey, whose monks complained of poverty. In addition, it allowed Adventius to remove Bivin, a relative of Teutberga and the lay-abbot of Gorze, justified by his alleged mismanagement of the abbey. He was replaced by a man named Betto.

Nicholas reacted furiously to the ruling, and rejected them to all Christian bishops as that of a heretical council. Gunthar and Theutagaud were first made to wait three weeks, and then on 30 October were met by a hostile council, and without charge, proof, or the chance to state their case were convicted of multiple violations. Gunthar refused to accept the sentence and complained to Emperor Louis that Nicholas wanted to become "emperor of the whole world." Louis marched on Rome with an army, intending to imprison the pope, but Nicholas fled. In Louis' wife Angilberga arranged a reconciliation between Louis and Nicholas.

Adventius sought to win back Nicholas' favor. He was not the only bishop to do so; Franco of Liège and Rathold of Strasbourg also accepted Nicholas' judgement and apologized for their behavior. Adventius promised to avoid contact with Gunthar, claimed to have been largely uninvolved with the Metz council, even though it took place in his episcopal city and he had previously been proud of that, and claimed he knew very little about Lothair's wedding with Teutberga, as in 855 he was not yet a bishop. They were supported by Charles the Bald, who Adventius had appealed to through Abbot Betto. This paid off by 864, and Nicholas forgave the recalcitrant bishops, allowing them to continue working for Lothair.

Lothair's uncles also turned on him; by advising Lothair to mend his ways, they threatened his kingdom, and it soon became known that Charles the Bald was planning to invade Lotharingia. Some of Lothair II's bishops sent a letter to the West Frankish bishops in response and stressed their duty to each other based on the prior concords between Lothair, Charles, and their subjects. The papacy went so far as to treat Lothair as if he was excommunicated.

=== Reunion with Teutberga ===
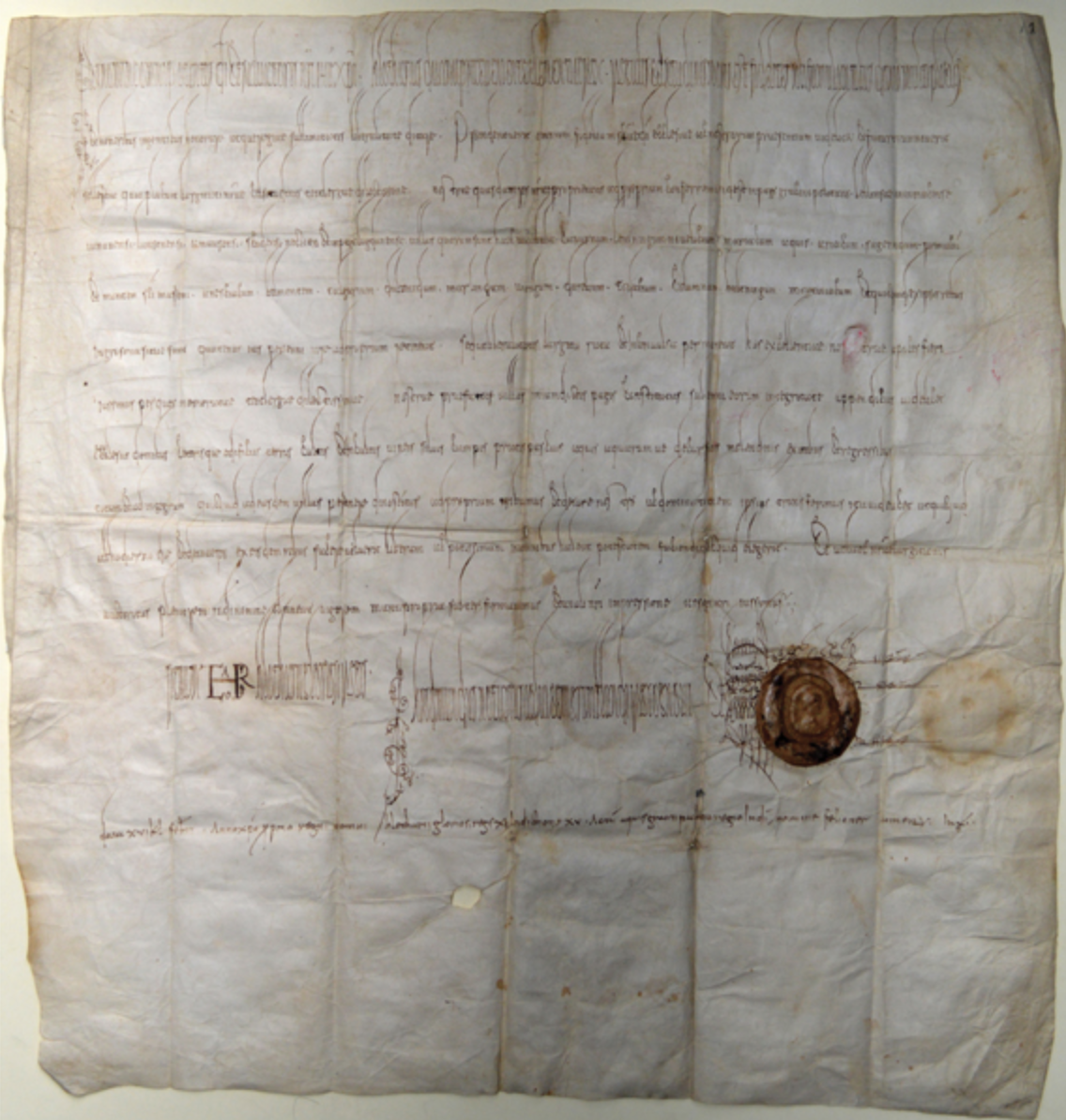
A charter of Lothair's grant to Teutberga after their reunion. It gifts her significant lands around the Alps, and may have been done in exchange for her cooperation.

In 865, through his envoy Arsenius, Nicholas forced Lothair to take back Teutberga. On 3 August, Teutberga was formally restored to her queenship, and on 15 August Lothair and Teutberga wore their crowns together at Gondreville. However, on his charters, Lothair still refused to assign Teutberga any formal title. Arsenius had brought Waldrada with her to Italy, but she escaped before reaching Rome, and upon returning, she retained all the power of a queen, much to Nicholas' dismay. Nicholas excommunicated her on 13 June 866, and in his bill he elaborated on his grievances against her: "to summarize, each and every day she explores with various ideas how she may return to her previous pleasures."

However, he was unable to enforce the sanction and the Lotharingian bishops evaded him. Lothair failed to pressure Teutberga into taking the veil in late 866, but she still requested a divorce alongside Lothair and Charles the Bald. Teutberga had seemingly tired of the union, and Charles had allied with Lothair, but Nicholas still refused. Lothair thought of another plan, in which he would arrange a retrial to prove that Teutberga was in fact not his wife. If that failed, Teutberga would undergo a trial by ordeal on charges of adultery; if guilty, she would be executed. Nicholas responded to rumors of this by writing to the Lotharingian bishops and to Charles the Bald to secure his support.

In June of 867, Lothair learned that his uncles had begun holding talks, and feared that they would invade his kingdom. His fears were well-founded; although Lothair could not have been expected to die soon, Charles and Louis agreed to divide the kingdoms of Lothair and Emperor Louis between themselves. It is possible that there took place an oath between the two kings, or alternatively in 868. Lothair reacted by meeting with Louis the German, assigning him care of his kingdom in the incident that Lothair went to Rome to meet with Nicholas. He also granted Alsace to his son Hugh, and commended Hugh into Louis' care.

=== Pope Adrian and the death of Lothair ===
Instead of going to Rome, Lothair sent an embassy headed by a man named Grimland, but they arrived to find the pope dead. Nicholas' successor, Adrian II, was immediately more willing to compromise. He allowed Teutberga, who claimed that she now feared for her life in Lothair's company, to live apart from the king, effectively divorcing them. Further, Adrian lifted Waldrada's excommunication and ordered Louis the German and Charles to leave Lothair and Emperor Louis alone. Lothair travelled to the south of Italy in the summer of 869 optimistically, and had his brother Louis' wife, Empress Engelberga, act as a mediator between himself and Pope Adrian. With him, he brought a document of an 866 grant to Teutberga as a sign of good faith. Lothair dined with the pope in the Lateran and gave him many ceremonial gifts. He returned north in high spirits, but he fell ill to a fever and many of his followers died to an epidemic near Lucca. Moving forward still, Lothair reached Piacenza on Sunday, 6 August, but around Noon he fell lifeless and became nonverbal. The king died the next day. An aristocrat named Wicbert made a donation to the monastery of Tournus for the soul of Lothair, "who was like a father to me." Lothair's cousin, Charles the Fat, and Teutberga both made donations to the canons of Sant'Antonino in Lothair's memory. No other widowed Carolingian queen did likewise for their husband.

== Coinage and Charters ==
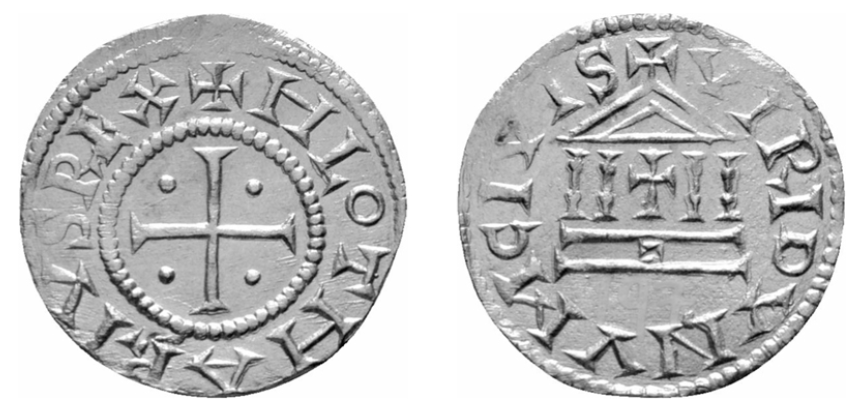
Lothair II coin from the Piligerheck Hoard

Carolingian coins, in general and under Lothair, were minted as small, flat silver pennies about two centimeters in diameter. Where his father was able to give himself the distinction of imperator or augustus, he could not. Lothair's coins were inscribed Hlotharius rex. A coin from the Piligerheck Hoard (pictured) was inscribed with +Hlotharius rex ("King Lothair") on the obverse and +Viridunum civi[ta]s ("the city of Verdun") on the reverse. These inscriptions accompany a cross on the obverse and a stylized church with a cross on the reverse. Lothair issued coins in Cologne, Trier, Strasbourg, Metz, Cambrai, and probably also at Mouzon and Aachen; in most of those places, his father had also minted. Under Lothair I, Dorestad dominated the Lotharingian money supply. In productivity, it outnumbered all his mints. but by the 840s and 850s it began to rapidly decline, and there were no Dorestad coins found under Lothair II.

Lothair did not have access to his father's four Italian mints, and seems to have minted far fewer coins. In the Piligerheck Hoard (near Koblenz), there were 2,500 coins, of which only five are his. Although this could partially be explained by the hoard being hidden early in Lothair's reign, the pattern holds; In another hoard discovered at Bassenheim, only one of the twenty coins are his. The only hoard made up wholly of his coins was discovered at Niederlahnstein in 2015. The reason for this is unknown. The disappearance of Dorestad certainly had a diminishing effect, but there does not seem to have been a shortage of coin. Lothair may have been content to let his father's coins circulate and add to it gradually over time, perhaps to emphasise the continuity of his rule.

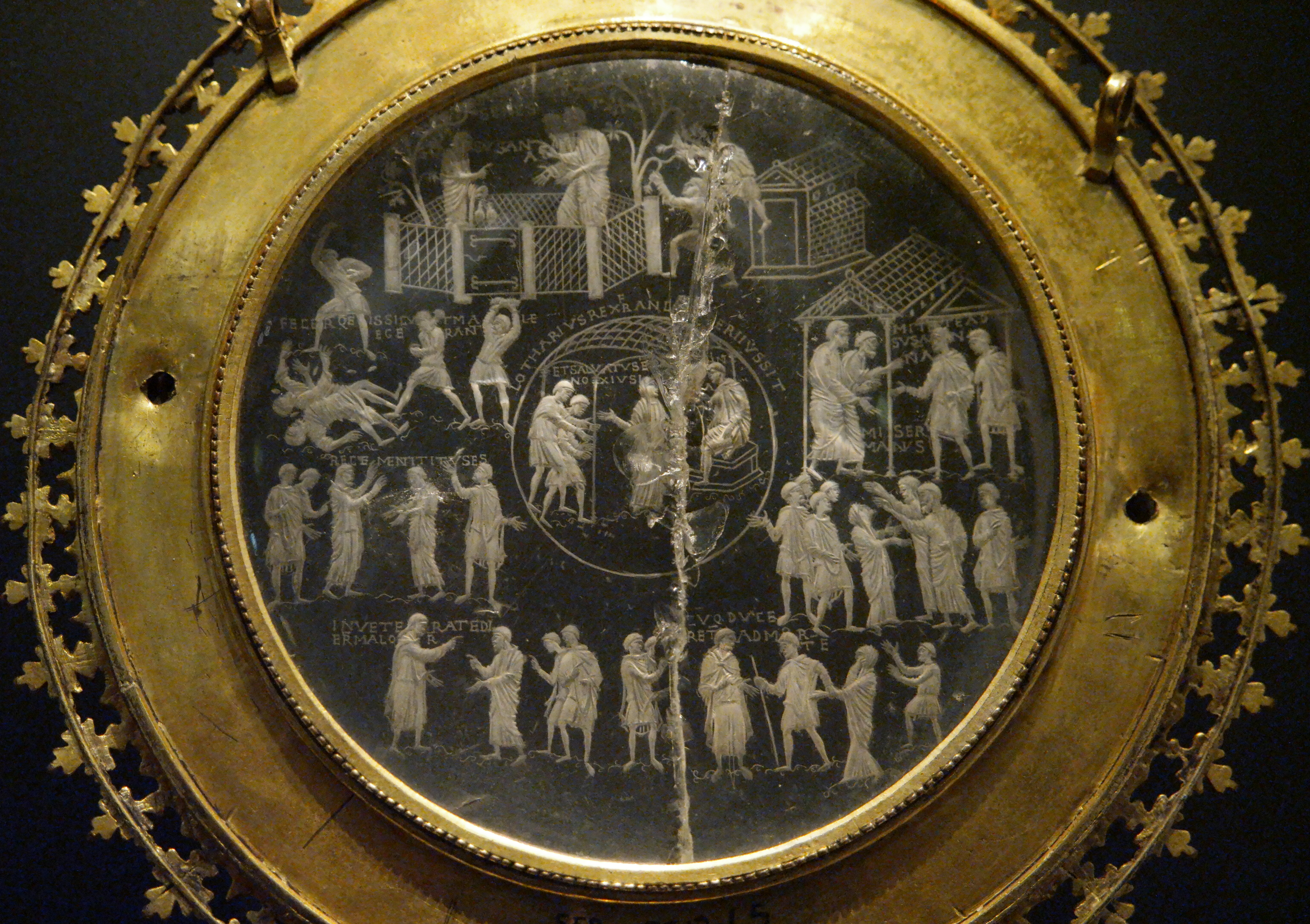
The Lothair Crystal dating to between 855 and 869 depicts the story of Susanna and the Elders. It may have been meant as a symbol of the king's justice.

In West's view, "we should not forget that in many aspects, Lothair II acted as an entirely traditional Carolingian king." 36 genuine charters survive from Lothair's reign, and another 11 are known to be lost, a figure far smaller than Charles the Bald's 354 surviving genuine documents. The king inherited a chancery from his father already staffed by experienced scribes. Lothair's most notable scribe was a man named Rodmund, who worked at the royal court for over 20 years.

== Northmen ==
From around the 840s to the 930s, Scandinavian aggression entered into a new phase. Beginning as early as 841, the small-scale raids of prior were now accompanied by large expeditions with the capacity to overwhelm Carolingian cities. There is an academic consensus that these expeditions grew in size, but the extent to which they did varies; Frankish chroniclers exaggerated the numerical strength of the Scandinavian forces. The frequency of these recorded expeditions expanded greatly during this time. The majority of this growth took place in West Francia, whereas in Lotharingia, Lothair I and II were more willing to accept the presence of loyal, settled Scandinavians. In 850, Rorik of Dorestad was established in Dorestad and other counties, and by 863 had been baptised. That said, Lotharingia still faced attacks, particularly against settlements near and on the Meuse and Rhine rivers.

In 857, Rorik left Frisia. With the support of Lothair, he forced Horik II of Denmark to cede him the territory northeast of the Eider river, possibly including Hedeby. Based on this, Lothair's motivation to help would have been a trade increase between Lotharingia and Scandinavia through Hedeby, but in Rorik's absence the Scandinavians plundered Batavia (or Betuwe). In Utrecht, the destruction of the cathedral of Saint Martin forced Bishop Hunger to abandon his see and take up residence at Sint Odiliënberg, significantly further inland. By 863 Rorik's presence back in Frisia had been attested, and by 873, the Eider region was again in the hands of the Danish kings.

The lack of detailed Lotharingian annals prevent a full understanding of raiding in the kingdom. A Scandinavian expedition travelled upstream to plunder Xanten in January of 863, whereupon they "plundered everything they found within and around the sanctuary [in the church of Saint Victor]." Lothair responded and attacked them, and pursued them to an island near the fort of Neuss. Lothair wanted to launch an assault but his men refused. West calls this "an indication of the king's courage" but also, perhaps, of difficulties asserting his authority. Lothair was forced to pay off the viking Rodulf in 864, which showed an availability of money within the kingdom (see Coinage and Charters). According to the Annales Bertiniani, he raised "4 denarii from every manse [a plot of land] in his whole kingdom." In 865, Lothair took land from one of his sisters to give to a northman, perhaps Rorik.

In May or June, Lothair ordered three days of fasting ahead of battle with "barbarian peoples." The letter from which this is known, written by Bishop Adventius of Metz, is notable for its showcasing of Lothair as a "powerful and capable protector of his people." This was probably in the year 867, when, after negotiations with Louis the German over his planned trip to Rome, Lothair raised an army to battle Rorik, who had been "driven from Frisia" by the Cokingi, an otherwise unknown local group. According to the Annales Bertiniani:

Returning from Frankfurt, he summoned up the host throughout his realm to the defence of the fatherland, as he explained, against the Northmen, for he expected that Roric, whom the local people (the new name for them is Cokings) had driven out of Frisia, would return bringing some Danes to help him.

Adventius wrote a letter to Pope Nicholas a few months later declaring that Lothair had won the battle in which "not a small number of pagans fell to the sword's edge." Rorik must have only lost part of his territory or returned rather quickly, as he is next mentioned in 870 as a leading local figure.

== Aftermath ==
Final division of Lothar's domains, under the Treaty of Meerssen in 870

After hearing of Lothair's death, Pope Adrian sent a number of letters north of the Alps which insisted that Louis II was the rightful heir to his brother's kingdom. Charles invaded West Francia as soon as news of Lothair's death reached him and by 9 September was crowned and anointed as king in the Metz cathedral by Adventius and Hincmar. Charles installed himself in Aachen but was unable to maintain his position and had to partition Lotharingia with Louis the German in the Treaty of Meerssen. In 875, Emperor Louis would die and Charles would claim both Italy and the emperorship. Hugh attempted to press his claim, temporarily seizing authority in part of Lotharingia in 879, but was blinded by 885.

== Descendants ==
Lothair is known to have had one son and three daughters by Waldrada, three of whom are listed in the Liber Memorialis of Remiremont:

- Hugh was probably born shortly before 855; he is attested to as early as 860 and became politically active around 879.
- Bertha was born sometime between 857 and 861.
- Ermengarde was born before 861.
- Gisela is not listed in the Liber Memorialis and must have been born between 862 and 866.

== Sources ==
- Airlie, Stuart (2021-01-28). Making and Unmaking the Carolingians: 751-888. Bloomsbury Academic. ISBN 978-1-78831-744-3.
- Cooijmans, Christian (2020). Monarchs and Hydrarchs: The Conceptual Development of Viking Activity across the Frankish Realm (c. 750–940). Routledge. ISBN 978-0-429-53582-6.
- Coupland, Simon (2007). Carolingian Coinage and the Vikings: Studies on Power and Trade in the 9th Century. Ashgate Publishing, Ltd. ISBN 978-0-86078-991-8.
- Goldberg, Eric J. (2006). Struggle for Empire: Kingship and Conflict under Louis the German, 817-876. Ithaca, NY: Cornell University Press.
- Grierson, Philip; Blackburn, Mark (1986). Medieval European Coinage: Volume 1, The Early Middle Ages (5th-10th Centuries). Cambridge University Press. ISBN 978-0-521-03177-6.
- Heidecker, Karl (2010). The Divorce of Lothar II: Christian Marriage and Political Power in the Carolingian World. Cornell University Press. ISBN 978-0-8014-3929-2.
- Hummer, Hans J. (2006). Politics and Power in Early Medieval Europe: Alsace and the Frankish Realm, 600–1000. Cambridge University Press. ISBN 978-1-139-44854-3.
- Hincmar, "Opusculum de divortio Lotharii regis et Tetbergae reginae," in Cursus completus patrologiae, tome cxxv., edited by J. P. Migne (Paris, 1857–79)
- Kings and Vikings: Scandinavia and Europe, Ad 700-1100. Routledge. 1989.
- McKitterick, Rosamond (1983). The Frankish Kingdoms Under the Carolingians, 751-987. Harlow: Longman.
- Nelson, Janet Laughland (1991). The Annals of St-Bertin. Manchester University Press. ISBN 978-0-7190-3426-8.
- Poupardin, René (2017). Louis the Pious and the Carolingian Kingdoms. Jovian Press. ISBN 978-1537804248.
- Riché, Pierre (1993). The Carolingians: A Family Who Forged Europe. Philadelphia: University of Pennsylvania Press.
- Sawyer, P. H. (1982). Kings and Vikings: Scandinavia and Europe, A.D. 700-1100. Methuen Publishing. ISBN 978-0-416-74180-3.
- Scholz, Bernhard W., ed. (1970). Carolingian Chronicles: Royal Frankish Annals and Nithard's Histories. Ann Arbor, MI: University of Michigan Press. ISBN 0472061860.
- West, Charles (2023). The Fall of a Carolingian Kingdom: Lotharingia, 855–869. Toronto: University of Toronto Press.
- West, Charles; Stone, Rachel, eds. (1979). De divortio Lotharii regis et Theutbergae reginae. Manchester University Press.
- West, Charles (2026). "Archbishop Hraban Maurus, Lothar II and the Roman Army". In Jens Schneider; Isabelle Rosé; Tristan Martine; Thomas Lienhard; Sylvie Joye; Justine Audebrand (eds.). Autorité de l'évêque – Autorité de l'écrit / Autorität der Bischöfe – Autorität des Wortes: Études en hommage à Geneviève Bührer-Thierry / Beiträge zu Ehren von Geneviève Bührer-Thierry. Brill. pp. 167–174. doi:10.30965/9783846769232.

Lothair II Carolingian dynasty Born: 837 Died: 7 August 869
Regnal titles
Preceded by Lothair I as king of Middle Francia	King of Lotharingia; 23 September 855 – 7 August 869	Kingdom divided between Louis the German and Charles the Bald
