= Pope Nicholas I =

Head of the Catholic Church from 858 to 867

Pope Saint Nicholas I
- Bishop of Rome
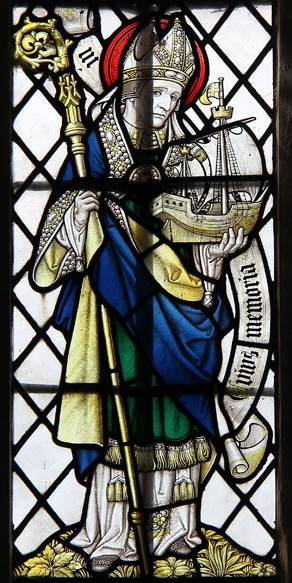
- Stained glass window of Pope Nicholas in Great Wakering, UK
- Church: Catholic Church
- Papacy began: 24 April 858
- Papacy ended: 13 November 867
- Predecessor: Benedict III
- Successor: Adrian II

Personal details
- Born: c. 800 Rome, Papal States
- Died: 13 November 867 (aged c. 67) Rome, Papal States

Sainthood
- Feast day: 13 November (from 1883); 6 December (until 1883)
- Venerated in: Catholic Church
- Canonized: Pre-Congregation

Pope Nicholas I (Latin: Nicolaus I; c. 800 – 13 November 867), also known as Nicholas the Great, was the bishop of Rome and leader of the Papal States from 24 April 858 until his death on 13 November 867. He is the last of the three popes listed in the Annuario Pontificio with the title "the Great", alongside Leo I and Gregory I.

Nicholas is remembered as a consolidator of papal authority, exerting decisive influence on the historical development of the papacy and its position among the Christian nations of Western Europe. Nicholas I asserted that the pope should have suzerainty over all Christians, even royalty, in matters of faith and morals.

Nicholas refused King Lothair II of Lotharingia's request for an annulment of his marriage to Teutberga. When a council pronounced in favor of annulment, Nicholas I declared the council deposed, its messengers excommunicated, and its decisions invalid. Despite pressure from the Carolingians, who laid siege to Rome, his decision held. During his reign, relations with the Byzantine Empire soured because of his support for Patriarch Ignatios of Constantinople, who had been removed from his post in favor of Photius I.

Since the seventeenth century, Nicholas has been venerated as a saint in the Catholic Church, with his feast on 13 November.

His claims of supremacy over territories outside his jurisdiction, the incorporation of the filioque in the Constantinopolitan Nicene creed, and his pressure on Bulgaria to remain under Roman rule, provoked tensions between Rome and Constantinople, leading to his excommunication by the Greeks at the fourth Council of Constantinople.

== Early career ==
Born to a distinguished family in Rome, son of the Defensor Theodore, Nicholas received excellent education. Distinguished for his piety, benevolence, competence, knowledge, and eloquence, he entered the service of the Church at an early age. Pope Sergius II (844–847) made him a subdeacon and Pope Leo IV (847–855) a deacon. After the death of Pope Benedict III on 17 April 858, Louis II of Italy came to Rome to influence the papal election. On 24 April Nicholas was elected pope, consecrated, and enthroned in St. Peter's Basilica in the presence of Emperor Louis. Three days later, Nicholas held a farewell banquet for the emperor and afterward, accompanied by the Roman nobility, visited him in his camp before the city, on which occasion the emperor met the pope and led his horse for some distance.

== Papacy ==
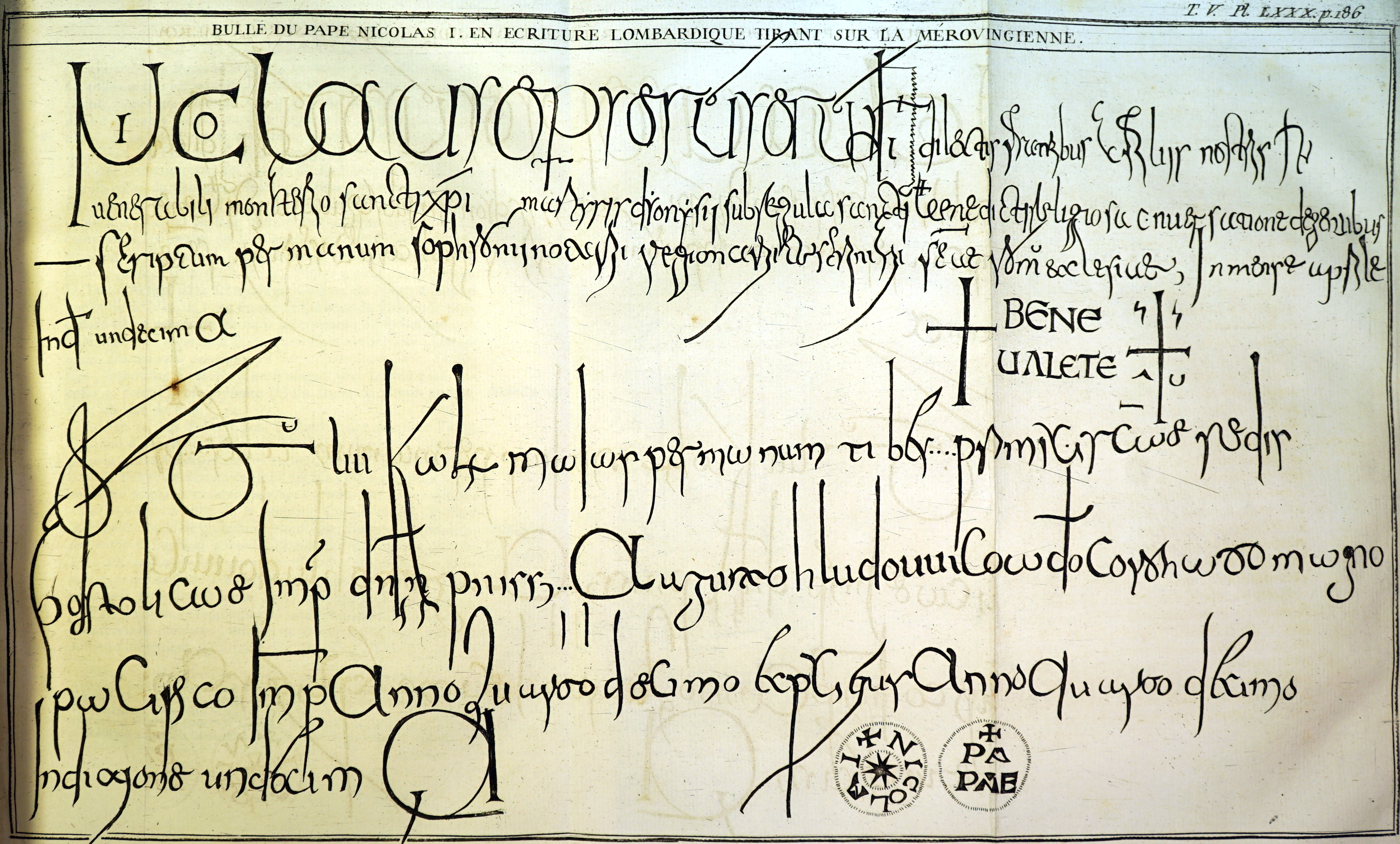
Reproduction of a bull of Nicholas I

To a spiritually exhausted and politically uncertain Western Europe beset by Muslim and Norse incursions, Pope Nicholas appeared as a conscientious representative of Roman primacy in the Church. He was filled with a high conception of his mission for the vindication of Christian morality and the defence of God's law. His co-operation with Emperor Louis II and Byzantine forces temporarily stemmed the Muslim advance in southern Italy. He also strengthened the Ostian fortifications against any future Muslim raids.

=== Bishops ===
Archbishop John of Ravenna oppressed the inhabitants of the Papal States, treated his suffragan bishops with violence, made unjust demands upon them for money, and illegally imprisoned priests. He also forged documents to support his claims against the Roman See and maltreated the papal legates. As the warnings of the pope were without result, and the archbishop ignored a thrice-repeated summons to appear before the papal tribunal, he was excommunicated. Having first visited the Emperor Louis at Pavia, the archbishop repaired with two imperial delegates to Rome, where Nicholas cited him before the Roman synod assembled in the autumn of 860. Upon this John fled from Rome.

Going in person to Ravenna, the pope then investigated and equitably regulated everything. Again appealing to the emperor, the archbishop was recommended by him to submit to the pope, which he did at the Roman Synod of November 861. Later on, however, he entered into a pact with the excommunicated archbishops of Trier and Cologne, was himself again excommunicated, and once more forced to make his submission to the pope. Another conflict arose between Nicholas and Archbishop Hincmar of Reims: this concerned the prerogatives of the papacy. Bishop Rothad of Soissons had appealed to the pope against the decision of the Synod of Soissons of 861, which had deposed him. Hincmar opposed the appeal to the pope, but eventually had to acknowledge the right of the papacy to take cognizance of important legal causes (causae majores) and pass independent judgment upon them. A further dispute broke out between Hincmar and the pope as to the elevation of the cleric Wulfad to the archiepiscopal See of Bourges, but here again, Hincmar finally submitted to the decrees of the Apostolic See, and the Frankish synods passed corresponding ordinances.

=== Marriage laws ===
Nicholas showed the same zeal in other efforts to maintain ecclesiastical discipline, especially as to the marriage laws. Ingiltrud, wife of Count Boso, had left her husband for a paramour; Nicholas commanded the bishops in the dominions of Charles the Bald to excommunicate her unless she returned to her husband. As she paid no attention to the summons to appear before the Synod of Milan in 860, she was put under the ban.

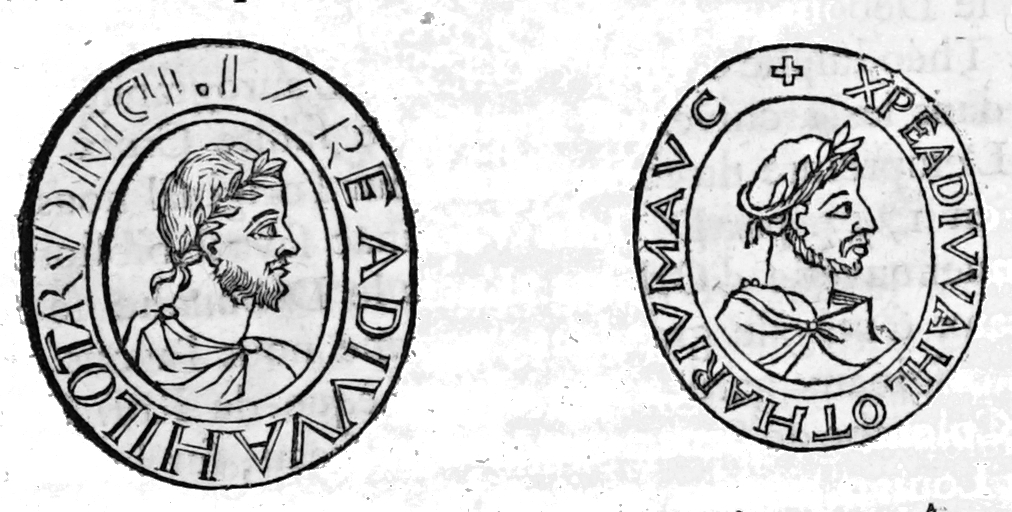
Seal of Lothair II

The pope was also involved in a desperate struggle with the bishops of Lotharingia over the inviolability of marriage. King Lothair II, not having any children by his wife, Teutberga, had abandoned her to marry his mistress, Waldrada. At the Synod of Aachen on 28 April 862, the bishops of Lotharingia approved this union, contrary to ecclesiastical law. At the Council of Metz, June 863, the papal legates, bribed by the king, assented to the Aachen decision, and condemned the absent Teutberga, who took refuge in the court of Lothair's uncle, Charles the Bald, and appealed to the Pope. Upon this the pope brought the matter before his own tribunal. The two archbishops, Günther of Cologne and Thietgaud of Trier, both rumoured to be relatives of Waldrada, had come to Rome as delegates, and were summoned before the Lateran Synod of October 863, when the pope condemned and deposed them as well as John of Ravenna and Hagano of Bergamo. Emperor Louis II took up the cause of the deposed bishops, while King Lothair advanced upon Rome with an army and laid siege to the city. The pope took refuge for two days in St. Peter's. Subsequently, Engelberga arranged a reconciliation with the pope, the emperor withdrew from Rome and commanded the former archbishops of Trier and Cologne to return to their homes. Nicholas never ceased his efforts to bring about a reconciliation between Lothair and his wife.

Another matrimonial case in which Nicholas interposed was that of Judith, daughter of Charles the Bald, who had married Count Baldwin I of Flanders without her father's consent. Frankish bishops had excommunicated Judith, and Hincmar of Reims had taken sides against her, but Nicholas urged leniency in order to protect freedom of marriage.

=== Relations with the Eastern Church ===
In the East, Nicholas was seen as trying to extend his papal power beyond what was canonical authority by asserting a "rulership" over the Church instead of the position of "highest honor among equals" accorded to the pope of Rome by the East. He contended that Patriarch Ignatios of Constantinople was deposed in 858 and Photius I raised to the patriarchal see in violation of ecclesiastical law. Nicholas sent two bishops as papal legates to the Council of Constantinople in 861, but they failed to follow papal instructions. In a letter of 8 May 862 addressed to the patriarchs of the East, Nicholas called upon them and all their bishops to refuse recognition to Photius, and at a Roman synod held in April 863, he excommunicated Photius.

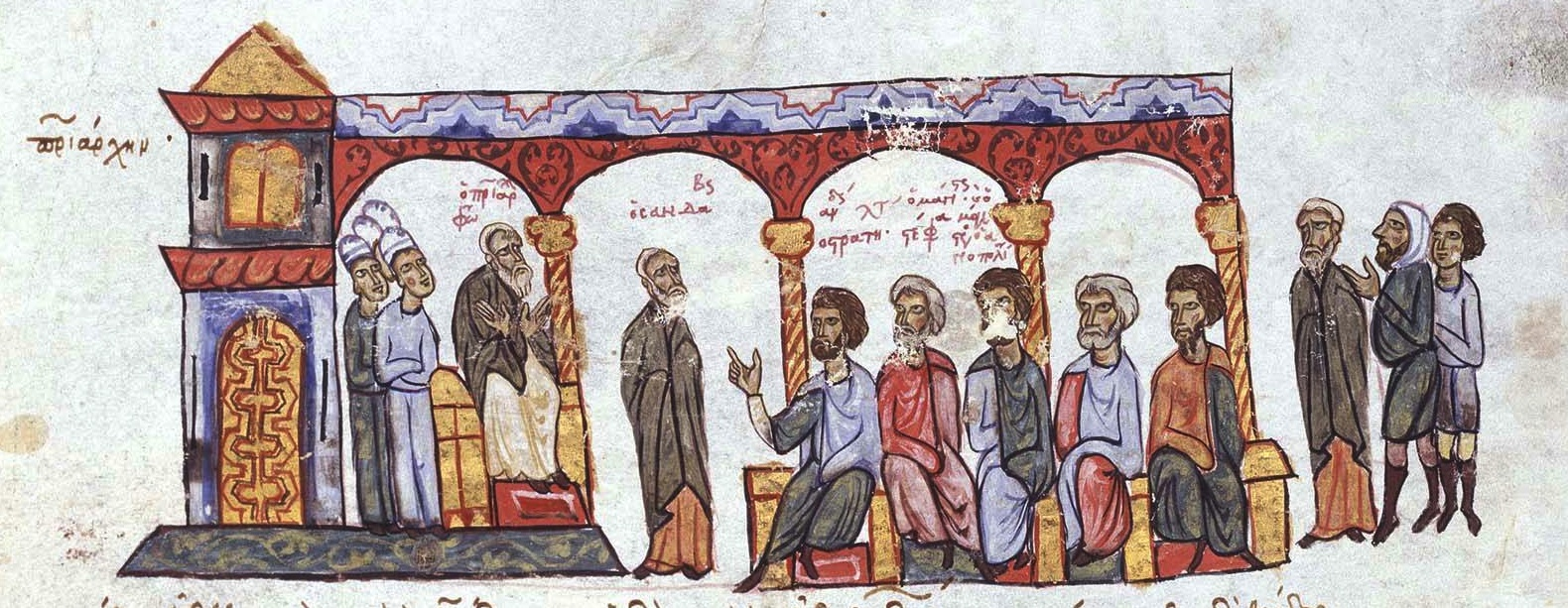
13th-century depiction of the interrogation of Photius I

According to the Church of Constantinople, Photius was elected lawfully and canonically by the will of the Byzantine Emperor Michael III in 858. This decision was affirmed later in 879 in a synod of Greek bishops regarded as ecumenical by some in the Orthodox Church. At this synod, Ignatius’ elevation to the patriarchate was declared to be uncanonical and Photius was acclaimed as properly elected as the new patriarch, a decision which ran counter to a previous council held at Constantinople – regarded as ecumenical by the Catholic Church – in which Photius had been deposed and Ignatius reinstated. The Eastern Church resented Nicholas' pressing of the doctrine of papal primacy. This led to conflict between Constantinople and Rome over doctrinal issues such as the addition of the Filioque clause to the Nicene-Constantinopolitan Creed and territorial claims due to the Church of Constantinople's seizure of territory from the Roman Patriarchate in southern Italy, Sicily and Illyricum during the Iconoclast controversy. A synod at Constantinople, headed by Photios, in 867 excommunicated Nicholas and rejected his claims of primacy, his efforts to convert Bulgaria to the obedience of the Roman Church, and the addition of the Filioque clause in parts of the Latin Church. The news of excommunication did not arrive in Rome until after Nicholas' death.

For a variety of reasons, Prince Boris I of Bulgaria became interested in converting to Christianity and undertook to do that at the hands of western clergymen to be supplied by King Louis the German of East Francia in 863. Late in the same year, the Byzantine Empire invaded Bulgaria as it suffered famine and natural disasters. Boris was forced to sue for peace. Because the majority of his people were still opposed to Christianity, he was secretly baptized according to the Byzantine rite. The Byzantine Emperor who became his godfather conceded territory in Thrace to him.

Unhappy with Byzantine influence and desiring an autocephalous status which Photius was unwilling to grant, Boris sent an embassy to Nicholas with 106 questions on the teaching and discipline of the Church in August 866. Nicholas answered these inquiries in his "Responsa Nicolai ad consulta Bulgarorum" (Giovanni Domenico Mansi, "Coll. Conc.", XV, 401 sqq.) and sent missionaries under the papal legate bishop Formosus (later Pope Formosus). Also in 866, Nicholas sent a letter to the Bulgarians ordering the burning of any books captured from the Muslims because they were deemed harmful and blasphemous. When Pope Adrian II rejected Boris's request that either Formosus or Marinus be made archbishop of Bulgaria, Boris began to look again towards Constantinople. In 870 a council of Constantinople granted the autocephalous status and Greek priests were sent as missionaries; they were soon replaced by Bulgarians.

=== Pants controversy ===
In 866, the Bulgar Khan St Boris the Baptiser wrote to Pope Nicholas asking a wide range of questions, one of which being whether or not it was sinful for Christians to wear pants. In response, Nicholas wrote, "For whether you or your women wear or do not wear pants neither impedes your salvation nor leads to any increase of your virtue." The Pope then proceeded with a discussion on the virtue of wearing the "spiritual pants" of a temperate life while restraining disordered passions.

== Legacy ==
Nicholas encouraged the missionary activity of the Church. He sanctioned the union of the sees of Bremen and Hamburg, and confirmed to Archbishop Ansgar of Bremen and his successors the office of papal legate to the Danes, Swedes, and Slavs. In many other ecclesiastical matters, he issued letters and decisions, and he took active measures against bishops who neglected their duties.

In Rome, Nicholas rebuilt and endowed several churches, and constantly sought to encourage religious life. He led a pious personal life guided by a spirit of Christian asceticism. Regino of Prüm reports that Nicholas was highly esteemed by the citizens of Rome and by his contemporaries generally (Chronicon, "ad annum 868," in "Mon. Germ. Hist." Script.", I.579). After his death he was regarded as a saint. His cult was re-affirmed in 1630 by Pope Urban VIII. His feast day is observed on 13 November.

A question that is important in judging the integrity of this pope is whether he made use of the forged pseudo-Isidorian papal decretals. After exhaustive investigation, Heinrich Schrörs concluded that the pope was neither acquainted with the pseudo-Isidorian collection in its entire extent, nor did he make use of its individual parts. He perhaps had a general knowledge of the false decretals, but did not base his view of the law upon them and owed his knowledge of them solely to documents that came to him from the Frankish Empire.

Nicholas decreed that the figure of the rooster should be placed on every church. The rooster has served as a religious icon and reminder of Peter's denial of Christ since that time, with some churches still having the rooster on the steeple today.

Perhaps the most impactful act of Pope Nicholas was, in the year 866, he ordered that all Christians should abstain from eating the "flesh, blood, or marrow" of warm-blooded animals on Wednesdays and Fridays. This led to the tradition still widely followed by Roman Catholics in the modern day of abstaining from eating meat on Fridays during the liturgical season of Lent, but the meat of cold-blooded animals (such as fish) still being eaten. While there is a theory that this tradition was instituted solely to benefit the fishermen of Europe, there is no evidence for this.

== See also ==
- List of Catholic saints
- List of popes

Catholic Church titles
| Preceded by Benedict III | Pope; 858–867 | Succeeded by Adrian II |
