= Teutberga =

Queen of Lotharingia from 855 to 869

Queen consort of Lotharingia
- Tenure: 855–869
- Died: 11 November 875
- Spouse: Lothair II
- House: Bosonids
- Father: Boso the Elder
- Mother: Engeltrude

Teutberga (also spelled Theutberga; died 875) was a Frankish noblewoman and queen consort of Lothair II of Lotharingia. A member of the Bosonid dynasty, she became the central figure in one of the most politically charged marriage disputes of the 9th century. Her struggle to maintain her marriage and royal status against Lothair's efforts to annul the union became a defining case in medieval Church authority over marriage and annulment.

== Family background ==
Teutberga was the daughter of Boso the Elder, Count of Turin and Valois, and Engeltrude. Her brother was Hucbert, Count of Valois and lay abbot of Saint Maurice’s Abbey. The Bosonid family held significant influence in Frankish politics, and Teutberga's marriage was likely arranged to reinforce alliances between noble houses and the royal Carolingian line.

== Marriage to Lothair II ==
Around 855, Teutberga married Lothair II, king of Lotharingia and great grandson of Charlemagne. The union was politically advantageous but personally strained. Lothair had a long-standing relationship with his concubine Waldrada, with whom he had children. By 857, Lothair sought to annul his marriage to Teutberga, citing alleged misconduct, including charges of incest and abortion—accusations most scholars interpret as politically motivated.

== Political and ecclesiastical conflict ==
Teutberga's powerful brother Hucbert opposed Lothair's efforts and led an armed revolt to support her. In 858, Teutberga underwent an ordeal by boiling water to prove her innocence, which she survived, strengthening her position.

Despite several synods attempting to annul the marriage, opposition from the Church intensified. In 863, Pope Nicholas I declared the annulment invalid and ordered Lothair to restore Teutberga as queen. Though Lothair temporarily complied, he continued to seek annulment until his death in 869.

== Later life and death ==
Following Lothair's death, Teutberga retired to a monastery. She died in 875, without issue. Though she never had children with Lothair, her resistance helped affirm the Church's authority over marriage law in the Carolingian Empire.

== Legacy ==
Teutberga's case became a precedent for debates on royal marriage and papal intervention. Her personal ordeal influenced ecclesiastical doctrine on the indissolubility of marriage and highlighted the political vulnerability of queens in the early medieval period.

== See also ==
- Lothair II
- Bosonid dynasty
- Hucbert
- Carolingian Empire
- Nicholas I (pope)

== Sources ==
- Settipani, Christian (2014). Les Ancêtres de Charlemagne (in French) (2nd ed.). Éditions Christian.
- Riché, Pierre (1993). The Carolingians: A Family Who Forged Europe. University of Pennsylvania Press. ISBN 978-0-8122-1342-3.
- McKitterick, Rosamond (1983). The Frankish Kingdoms under the Carolingians, 751–987. Longman.
- Nelson, Janet L. (1992). Charles the Bald. Longman. ISBN 978-0582491786.

== Bibliography ==
- (in French) Baron Ernouf (1858) Histoire de Waldrade, de Lother II et de leurs descendants (Paris).
