= List of Italian royal consorts =

Spouses of Italian rulers

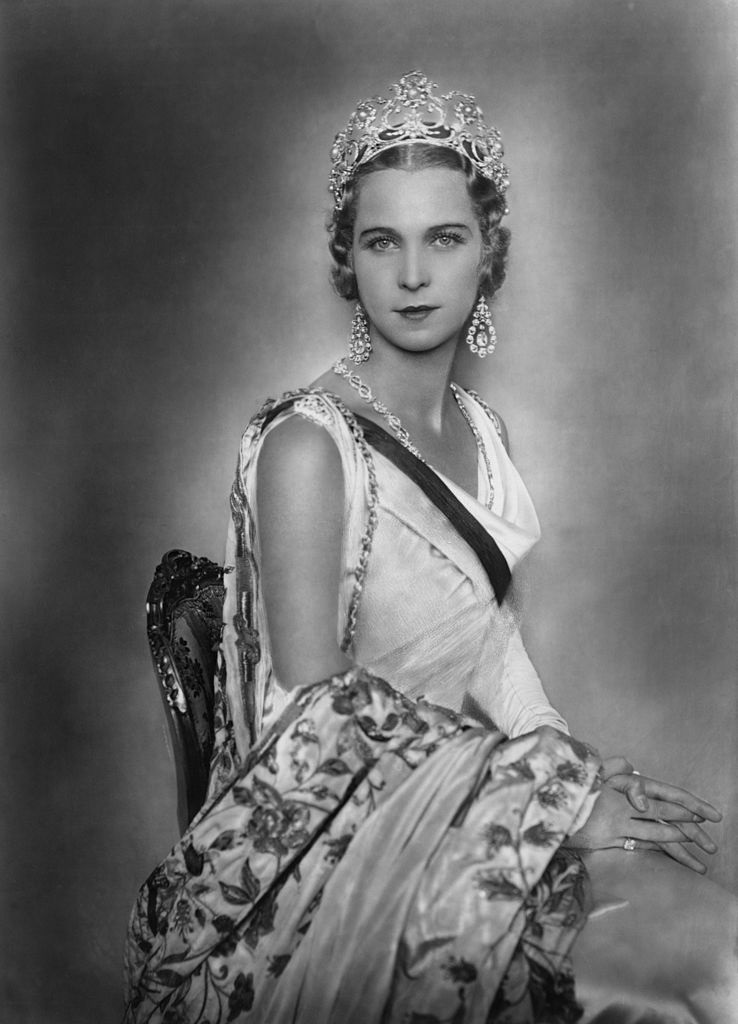
Marie-José of Belgium, the last Queen of Italy, as the wife of Umberto II of Savoy.

Queen of Italy (regina Italiae in Latin and regina d'Italia in Italian) is a title adopted by many spouses of the rulers of the Italian Peninsula after the fall of the Roman Empire. The details of where and how the ruling kings ruled are in the article about them. The elective dignity of Roman Emperor was restricted to males only; therefore, there was never an Italian Queen regnant, though women such as Adelaide of Italy and Theophanu and Maria Theresa of Austria, who controlled the power of ruling, ruled as de facto Queens Regnant.

== Queen consorts of Italy, under Odoacer ==
Picture	Name	Father	Birth	Marriage	Became Consort	Ceased to be Consort	Death	Spouse
	Sunigilda	?	?	?	23 August 476	17 March 493 husband's death	?	Odoacer

== Ostrogothic Queen consorts of Italy ==
Picture	Name	Father	Birth	Marriage	Became Consort	Ceased to be Consort	Death	Spouse
	Audofleda of the Salian Franks	Childeric I, King of the Salian Franks (Merovingian)	470	493		30 August 526 husband's death	?	Theodoric
	Mathesuentha of the Visigoths	Eutharic (Areal line)	517	536		540 husband's death	after 550	Witiges
	Berthora of Rheims	Theudebert I, King of Rheims (Merovingian)	535	549		1 July 552 husband's death	555	Totila
No names of Ostrogothic queens are mentioned beyond this point.
Picture	Name	Father	Birth	Marriage	Became Consort	Ceased to be Consort	Death	Spouse

== Lombardic Queen consorts of Italy ==
Picture	Name	Father	Birth	Marriage	Became Consort	Ceased to be Consort	Death	Spouse
	Chlothsind of the Franks	Chlothar I, King of the Franks (Merovingian)	?	?	?	?	?	Alboin
	Rosamund of the Gepids	Cunimund, King of the Gepids	?	567		28 June 572/573 husband's death	?	Alboin
	Theodelinda of Bavaria	Garibald I, Duke of Bavaria (Agilolfings)	?	15 May 589		5 September 590 husband's death	22 January 627	Authari
	Theodelinda of Bavaria	Garibald I, Duke of Bavaria (Agilolfings)	?	May 591		616 husband's death	22 January 627	Agilulf
	Gundiberga of the Lombards	Authari	591	?	626 husband's accession, locked in monastery	636 husband's death	?	Arioald
	Gundiberga of the Lombards	Authari	591	after 636		652 husband's death	?	Rothari
	Rodelinda	?	?	?	?	688 husband's death	?	Perctarit
	Theodota of the Lombards	Aripert I	?	after 662		?	?	Grimoald I
No names of Lombardic queens are mentioned until 739.
	Guntrude	?	?	?	712 husband's ascension	744 husband's disposition	?	Liutprand
	Tassia	?	?	?	744 husband's ascension	749 husband's disposition	?	Ratchis
	Ansa	Verissimo	?	?	744 husband's ascension	5 June 774 husband's disposition	?	Desiderius
	Hildegard	Gerold of Vinzgouw	758	771	774 husband's coronation as Lombardic king	30 April 783		Charles I
	Fastrada of Franconia	Raoul III de Franconie et d'Aéda de Bavière	765	784 as Queen consort the Lombards		10 October 794		Charles I
	Luitgard of Sundgau	Luitfrid II, Count of Sundgau	776	794 as Queen consort the Lombards		4 June 800		Charles I
Picture	Name	Father	Birth	Marriage	Became Consort	Ceased to be Consort	Death	Spouse

== Queen consorts of Italy ==
=== Carolingian dynasty, (774–887) ===
Picture	Name	Father	Birth	Marriage	Became Consort	Ceased to be Consort	Death	Spouse
	Hildegard	Gerold of Vinzgouw (Agilolfings)	758	771	5 June 774 husband's coronation as Lombardic king	30 April 783		Charles I
	Fastrada of Franconia	Raoul III of Franconia	765	784 as Queen consort the Lombards		10 October 794		Charles I
	Luitgard of Sundgau	Luitfrid II, Count of Sundgau (Etichonids)	776	794 as Queen consort the Lombards		4 June 800		Charles I
	Bertha of Gellone	William of Gellone, Count of Toulouse	?	795?	781 as Queen consort of Italy	8 July 810 husband's death	?	Pepin
	Cunigunda of Laon	?	?	813		17 April 818 husband's death	?	Bernard I
	Ermengarde of Tours	Hugh of Tours (Etichonids)	804	15 October 821 as sole queen 15 June 844 as senior queen		20 March 851		Lothair I
	Engelberga of Parma	Adelchis I, Count of Parma (Supponids)	830	5 October 851		12 August 875 husband's death	896/901	Louis II
	Richilde of Provence	Bivin of Gorze, Count of the Ardennes (Bosonid)	845	870	12 August 875 husband's ascension	6 October 877 husband's death	2 June 910	Charles II
	Richardis of Swabia	Erchanger, Count of the Nordgau (Ahalolfinger)	840	1 August 862	879 husband's ascension	887 husband's deposition	18 September, between 894 and 896	Charles III
Picture	Name	Father	Birth	Marriage	Became Consort	Ceased to be Consort	Death	Spouse

After 887, Italy fell into instability, with many rulers claiming the Kingship simultaneously:

=== Unruoching dynasty, (887–924) ===
Picture	Name	Father	Birth	Marriage	Became Consort	Ceased to be Consort	Death	Spouse
	Bertila of Spoleto	Suppo II of Spoleto (Supponids)	860	880	26 December 887 husband's ascension	December 915		Berengar I
	Anna of Provence	Louis the Blind (Bosonids)	-	by December 915		7 April 924 husband's death	after May 930	Berengar I
Picture	Name	Father	Birth	Marriage	Became Consort	Ceased to be Consort	Death	Spouse

=== Widonid dynasty, (889–896) ===
Picture	Name	Father	Birth	Marriage	Became Consort	Ceased to be Consort	Death	Spouse
	Ageltrude of Benevento	Adelchis, Prince of Benevento	?	early 880s	889 husband's coronation	12 December 894 husband's death	27 August 923	Guy
Picture	Name	Father	Birth	Marriage	Became Consort	Ceased to be Consort	Death	Spouse

=== Carolingian Dynasty, (896–899) ===
Picture	Name	Father	Birth	Marriage	Became Consort	Ceased to be Consort	Death	Spouse
	Ota of Neustria	Berengar I of Neustria (Conradines)	874	before the end of 888	22 February 896 husband's coronation	8 December 899 husband's death	after 30 November 903	Arnulf
Picture	Name	Father	Birth	Marriage	Became Consort	Ceased to be Consort	Death	Spouse

=== Bosonid dynasty, (900–905) ===
Picture	Name	Father	Birth	Marriage	Became Consort	Ceased to be Consort	Death	Spouse
	Anna of Constantinople	Leo VI the Wise (Macedonian)	888	around 900	12 October 900 husband's coronation	21 July 905 husband relinquished titles	912	Louis III
Picture	Name	Father	Birth	Marriage	Became Consort	Ceased to be Consort	Death	Spouse

=== Elder Welf dynasty, (922–926) ===
Picture	Name	Father	Birth	Marriage	Became Consort	Ceased to be Consort	Death	Spouse
	Bertha of Swabia	Burchard II, Duke of Swabia (Hunfridings)	907	922	922 husband's coronation	926 husband's deposition 933 husband relinquished titles	after 2 January 966	Rudolph
Picture	Name	Father	Birth	Marriage	Became Consort	Ceased to be Consort	Death	Spouse

=== Bosonid dynasty, (926–950) ===
Picture	Name	Father	Birth	Marriage	Became Consort	Ceased to be Consort	Death	Spouse
	Alda (or Hilda)	A German	?	after 924		before 932 marriage annulled	?	Hugh
	Marozia of Tusculum, Senatrix and Patricia of Rome	Theophylact I, Count of Tusculum (Tusculani)	890	932		December 932; 933 husband fled, her imprisonment	932/937	Hugh
	Bertha of Swabia	Burchard II, Duke of Swabia (Hunfridings)	907	12 December 937		10 April 948 husband's death	after 2 January 966	Hugh
	Adelaide of Burgundy and Italy	Rudolf II of Burgundy and Italy (Elder Welf)	931	12 December 947	10 April 948 husband's coronation	22 November 950 husband's death	16 December 999	Lothair II
Picture	Name	Father	Birth	Marriage	Became Consort	Ceased to be Consort	Death	Spouse

=== Anscarid dynasty, (950–963) ===
Picture	Name	Father	Birth	Marriage	Became Consort	Ceased to be Consort	Death	Spouse
	Willa of Tuscany	Boso, Margrave of Tuscany (Bosonids)	910	930/931	15 December 950 husband's coronation	953 husband's imprisonment	963/after 966	Berengar II
	Gerberga	Unknown or Lambert of Chalon	945	960/62		963 husband's desposition	11 December 986/991	Adalbert
Picture	Name	Father	Birth	Marriage	Became Consort	Ceased to be Consort	Death	Spouse

=== Ottonian dynasty, (951–1002) ===
In 951 Otto I of Germany invaded Italy and was crowned "King of the Lombards". In 952, Berengar and Adalbert became vassals, but remained Kings until being deposed by Otto.

Picture	Name	Father	Birth	Marriage	Became Consort	Ceased to be Consort	Death	Spouse
	Adelaide of Burgundy and Italy	Rudolf II of Burgundy and Italy (Elder Welf)	931	951		7 May 973 husband's death	16 December 999	Otto I
	Theophanu of Constantinople		960	14 April 972		7 December 983 husband's death	15 June 991	Otto II
Picture	Name	House	Birth	Marriage	Became Consort	Ceased to be Consort	Death	Spouse

=== Anscarid dynasty, (1002–1014) ===
Picture	Name	Father	Birth	Marriage	Became Consort	Ceased to be Consort	Death	Spouse
	Bertha	probably Otbert II, Margrave of Milan	?	before 1000	c. 1002 husband accession	c. 1014 husband gave up claim	?	Arduin
Picture	Name	House	Birth	Marriage	Became Consort	Ceased to be Consort	Death	Spouse

After the brief interruption by Arduin of Ivrea and after the restoration of the Holy Roman Emperor as the sole holder of the title King of Italy, the title became one of the many appanages of the Holy Roman Empress.

=== Ottonian dynasty, (1004–1024) ===
Picture	Name	Father	Birth	Marriage	Became Consort	Ceased to be Consort	Death	Spouse
	Cunigunde of Luxembourg	Siegfried, Count of Luxembourg (Luxembourg)	975	1000	14 May 1004 husband's coronation	13 July 1024 husband's death	3 March 1033	Henry II
Picture	Name	House	Birth	Marriage	Became Consort	Ceased to be Consort	Death	Spouse

=== Salian dynasty, (1026–1125) ===
Picture	Name	House	Birth	Marriage	Became Consort	Ceased to be Consort	Death	Spouse
	Gisela of Swabia	Hermann II, Duke of Swabia (Conradines)	11 November 995	1016	1026 husband's coronation as King of Italy	4 June 1039 husband's death	14 February 1043	Conrad II, Holy Roman Emperor
	Agnes de Poitou	William V, Duke of Aquitaine (Ramnulfids)	1025	21 November 1043		5 October 1056 husband's death	14 December 1077	Henry III, Holy Roman Emperor
Bertha of Savoy, the Holy Roman Empress	Bertha of Savoy	Otto, Count of Savoy (Savoy)	21 September 1051	13 July 1066	25 June 1080 husband's coronation as King of Italy	27 December 1087		Henry IV, Holy Roman Emperor
	Eupraxia of Kiev	Vsevolod I, Grand Prince of Kiev (Rurikids)	1071	14 August 1089		1093 stepson's coronation	20 July 1109	Henry IV, Holy Roman Emperor
	Constanze of Sicily	Roger I of Sicily (Hauteville)	1077–1087	1095		April 1098 husband's deposition	1138	Conrad II of Italy
	Matilda of England	Henry I of England (Normandy)	7 February 1101	7 January 1114		23 May 1125 husband's death	10 September 1167	Henry V, Holy Roman Emperor
Picture	Name	House	Birth	Marriage	Became Consort	Ceased to be Consort	Death	Spouse

=== House of Supplinburg, (1128–1137) ===
Picture	Name	House	Birth	Marriage	Became Consort	Ceased to be Consort	Death	Spouse
	Richenza of Northeim	Henry, Margrave of Frisia (Northeim)	1087/89	1100	1128 husband's coronation as King of Italy	4 December 1137 husband's death	10 June 1141	Lothair III, Holy Roman Emperor
Picture	Name	House	Birth	Marriage	Became Consort	Ceased to be Consort	Death	Spouse

=== House of Hohenstaufen, (1154–1197) ===
Picture	Name	House	Birth	Marriage	Became Consort	Ceased to be Consort	Death	Spouse
	Beatrice I, Countess of Burgundy	Renaud III, Count of Burgundy (Ivrea)	1148	9 June 1156		15 November 1184		Frederick I, Holy Roman Emperor
	Constance of Sicily	Roger II of Sicily (Hauteville)	2 November 1154	27 January 1186	14 April 1191 husband's coronation as Emperor	28 September 1197 husband's death	27 November 1198	Henry VI, Holy Roman Emperor
Picture	Name	House	Birth	Marriage	Became Consort	Ceased to be Consort	Death	Spouse

=== House of Welf, (1208–1215) ===
Picture	Name	House	Birth	Marriage	Became Consort	Ceased to be Consort	Death	Spouse
	Beatrice of Swabia	Philip of Swabia (Hohenstaufen)	April/June 1198	23 July 1212		11 August 1212		Otto IV
Picture	Name	House	Birth	Marriage	Became Consort	Ceased to be Consort	Death	Spouse

=== House of Hohenstaufen, (1212–1250) ===
Picture	Name	House	Birth	Marriage	Became Consort	Ceased to be Consort ojbor;ph4p[l] ,f[3[3 pm[2	Death	Spouse
	Constance of Aragon	Alfonso II of Aragón (Barcelona)	1179	5 August 1209	9 December 1212 husband's coronation as Roman king 22 November 1220 husband's coronation as Emperor	23 June 1222		Frederick II, Holy Roman Emperor
	Isabella II of Jerusalem	John of Brienne, King of Jerusalem (Brienne)	1212	9 November 1225		25 April 1228		Frederick II, Holy Roman Emperor
	Isabella of England	John of England (Plantagenet)	1214	15/20 July 1235		1 December 1241		Frederick II, Holy Roman Emperor
	Bianca Lancia	A child of Manfred I Lancia (Aleramici-Lancia)	c. 1200	c. 1244? Evidence for marriage is dubious			c. 1244	Frederick II, Holy Roman Emperor
Picture	Name	House	Birth	Marriage	Became Consort	Ceased to be Consort	Death	Spouse

=== House of Luxembourg, (1308–1313) ===
Picture	Name	House	Birth	Marriage	Became Consort	Ceased to be Consort	Death	Spouse
	Margaret of Brabant	John I, Duke of Brabant (Leuven)	4 October 1276	9 July 1292	27 November 1308 husband's became Roman king 6 January 1311 husband's coronation as King of Italy	14 December 1311		Henry VII, Holy Roman Emperor
Picture	Name	House	Birth	Marriage	Became Consort	Ceased to be Consort	Death	Spouse

=== House of Wittelsbach, (1327–1347) ===
Picture	Name	House	Birth	Marriage	Became Consort	Ceased to be Consort	Death	Spouse
	Margaret, Countess of Hainaut	William I, Count of Hainaut (Avesnes)	c. 1311	26 February 1324	23 October 1327 husband's coronation as King of Italy	11 October 1347 husband's death	23 June 1356	Louis IV, Holy Roman Emperor
Picture	Name	House	Birth	Marriage	Became Consort	Ceased to be Consort	Death	Spouse

=== House of Luxembourg, (1355–1437) ===
Picture	Name	House	Birth	Marriage	Became Consort	Ceased to be Consort	Death	Spouse
	Anna of Świdnica	Henry II, Duke of Świdnica (Piast)	c. 1339	27 May 1353	January 1355 husband's coronation as King of Italy	11 July 1362		Charles IV, Holy Roman Emperor
	Elizabeth of Pomerania	Bogislaw V, Duke of Pomerania (Pomerania-Wolgast)	c. 1347	21 May 1363		29 November 1378 husband's death	14 February 1393	Charles IV, Holy Roman Emperor
	Barbara of Celje	Hermann II, Count of Celje (Celje)	1390/1395	1408	21 July 1411 husband's election as Emperor 25 November 1431 husband's coronation as King 31 May 1433 husband's coronation as Emperor	9 December 1437 husband's death	11 July 1451	Sigismund, Holy Roman Emperor
Picture	Name	House	Birth	Marriage	Became Consort	Ceased to be Consort	Death	Spouse

=== House of Habsburg, (1437–1745) ===
Picture	Name	House	Birth	Marriage	Became Consort	Ceased to be Consort	Death	Spouse
	Leonor of Portugal	Edward of Portugal (Aviz)	18 September 1434	16 March 1452	19 March 1452 husband's coronation as Emperor	3 September 1467		Frederick III, Holy Roman Emperor
	Isabella of Portugal	Manuel I of Portugal (Aviz)	23 October 1503	10 March 1526	24 February 1530 husband's coronation as Emperor	1 May 1539		Charles V, Holy Roman Emperor
Charles V was the last emperor to be crowned king of Italy or to officially use the title. The Habsburg emperors claimed the Italian crown until 1801. The empire continued to include Italian territories until its dissolution in 1806.
Picture	Name	House	Birth	Marriage	Became Consort	Ceased to be Consort	Death	Spouse

=== House of Bonaparte, (1805–1814) ===
Picture	Name	Father	Birth	Marriage	Became Consort	Ceased to be Consort	Death	Spouse
	Joséphine de Beauharnais	Joseph-Gaspard Tascher de la Pagerie (Tascher de la Pagerie)	23 June 1763	9 March 1796	26 May 1805 husband's ascension	10 January 1810 divorce	29 May 1814	Napoleon I
	Marie Louise of Austria	Francis II, Holy Roman Emperor (Habsburg-Lorraine)	12 December 1791	1 April 1810		6 April 1814 husband's abdication	17 December 1847	Napoleon I
Picture	Name	Father	Birth	Marriage	Became Consort	Ceased to be Consort	Death	Spouse

=== House of Savoy, (1861–1946) ===
Picture	Name	Arms	Father	Birth	Marriage	Became Consort	Ceased to be Consort	Death	Spouse
	Margherita of Savoy-Genoa		Ferdinand, 1st Duke of Genoa (Savoy)	20 November 1851	21 April 1868	9 January 1878 husband's accession	29 July 1900 husband's death	4 January 1926	Umberto I
	Elena of Montenegro		Nicholas I of Montenegro (Petrović-Njegoš)	8 January 1873	24 October 1896	29 July 1900 husband's accession	9 May 1946 husband's abdication	28 November 1952	Victor Emmanuel III
	Marie-José of Belgium		Albert I of Belgium (Saxe-Coburg and Gotha)	4 August 1906	8 January 1930	9 May 1946 husband's accession	12 June 1946 monarchy abolished	27 January 2001	Umberto II
Picture	Name	Arms	Father	Birth	Marriage	Became Consort	Ceased to be Consort	Death	Spouse

== See also ==
- List of Roman and Byzantine empresses
- List of queens of the Lombards
- Holy Roman Empresses
- List of German queens
- List of Burgundian consorts
- Queens of Jerusalem
- List of consorts of Naples
- List of Sardinian consorts
- List of Sicilian consorts
- List of royal consorts of the Kingdom of the Two Sicilies
- List of consorts of Savoy
- List of consorts of Milan
- List of consorts of Tuscany
- List of consorts of Montferrat
- List of consorts of Parma
- List of consorts of Urbino
- List of consorts of Modena
- List of consorts of Mantua
