= Bertila of Spoleto =

Queen of Italy from 887 to 915

Queen consort of Italy
- Reign: 26 December 887 - December 915
- Born: c. 860
- Died: before December 915
- Spouses: Berengar I of Italy
- Issue: Gisela, Countess of Ivrea; Bertha, Abbess of Santa Giulia in Brescia
- House: Supponid
- Father: Suppo II
- Mother: Bertha
- Religion: Catholic Church

Bertila of Spoleto (also Bertilla) (c. 860 – before December 915) was the wife of Berengar I of Italy, and by marriage Queen consort of Italy and Holy Roman Empress.

== Life ==
Bertila was a member of the powerful Supponid family. She was the daughter of Suppo II (c. 835 – c. 885), and of Bertha (dead by 921). Her paternal grandfather was Adelchis I of Spoleto, second son of Suppo I, and her paternal aunt was Engelberga, wife of Louis II of Italy.

She married Berengar, margrave of Friuli, sometime between 870 and 880. Berengar became King of Italy in 888, with Bertila as his queen. However, her husband lost his throne in the following year to Guy of Spoleto. Berengar began to reassert his power in 896, after the fall of the Spoleto family, and the withdrawal of Emperor Arnulf from the peninsula; however, a defeat by a Magyar army, and the decision by the Italian nobles to appoint Louis of Provence as King of Italy, delayed the King and Queen's formal return to power until 905. Throughout this period Bertila frequently intervened in Berengar's diplomas, particularly in favour of churches and monasteries. In these documents, Bertila is entitled consors regni ('partner in rule'), a title specifically denoting her power and influence, as opposed to that of a mere 'wife' (coniunx).

In 915 Bertila became Holy Roman Empress, after her husband was crowned Emperor. She died this same year, probably of poisoning, and perhaps at her husband's request. At about this time, Bertila had been accused of infidelity, although this charge was frequently made against the wives of kings in this period, and often masked wider political intrigues. Bertila was also accused of taking advice from an evil 'Circe'. Tiziana Lazzari suggests that this is a reference to Bertha of Tuscany, wife of Adalbert II, Margrave of Tuscany, who was in open opposition to Berengar's rule. By December 915 Berengar had remarried, to Anna of Provence, daughter of Louis the Blind.

== Issue ==
Bertila and Berengar had several children. By 908, their daughter, Bertha, was abbess of Santa Giulia in Brescia, where her paternal aunt, Gisela, had once been a nun. Their younger daughter Gisela of Friuli (882–910) married Adalbert I of Ivrea, who were the parents of Berengar II of Italy.

== Sources ==
- G. Arnaldi, ‘Bertilla,’ In: Dizionario Biografico degli Italiani, Vol. 9 (Rome, 1967).
- L. Schiaparelli, I diplomi di Berengario I (Rome, 1903).
- B. Rosenwein, ‘The family politics of Berengar I, King of Italy (888-924),’ Speculum, LXXI (1996),
- P. Skinner, Women in Medieval Italian Society, 500-1200 (Harlow, 2001).
- Previté-Orton, C. W. 'Italy and Provence, 900–950,' The English Historical Review, Vol. 32, No. 127. (Jul., 1917), pp 335–347.
- Reuter, Timothy (trans.) The Annals of Fulda (Manchester, 1992).
- Gesta Berengari, ed. P. de Winterfeld, MGH Poëtae Latini Medii Aevi, IV, 1 (Berlin, 1899).
- T. Lazzari, 'Le donne del regno italico', in L’eredità culturale di Gina Fasoli. Atti del convegno di studi per il centenario della nascita (1905-2005) (Bologna-Bassano del Grappa, 25-26 novembre 2005), ed., F. Bocchi, G.M. Varanini (Rome, 2008).

Preceded by Anna of Constantinople	Empress of the Holy Roman Empire; 915	Vacant Title next held by Adelaide of Italy
Preceded by Richardis; 879–887; Anna of Constantinople; 900–905	Queen consort of Italy; 887–889; 905–915	Succeeded by Ageltrude; 889–894; Anna of Provence; 915–924
