= List of Holy Roman empresses =

Wives of Holy Roman Emperors

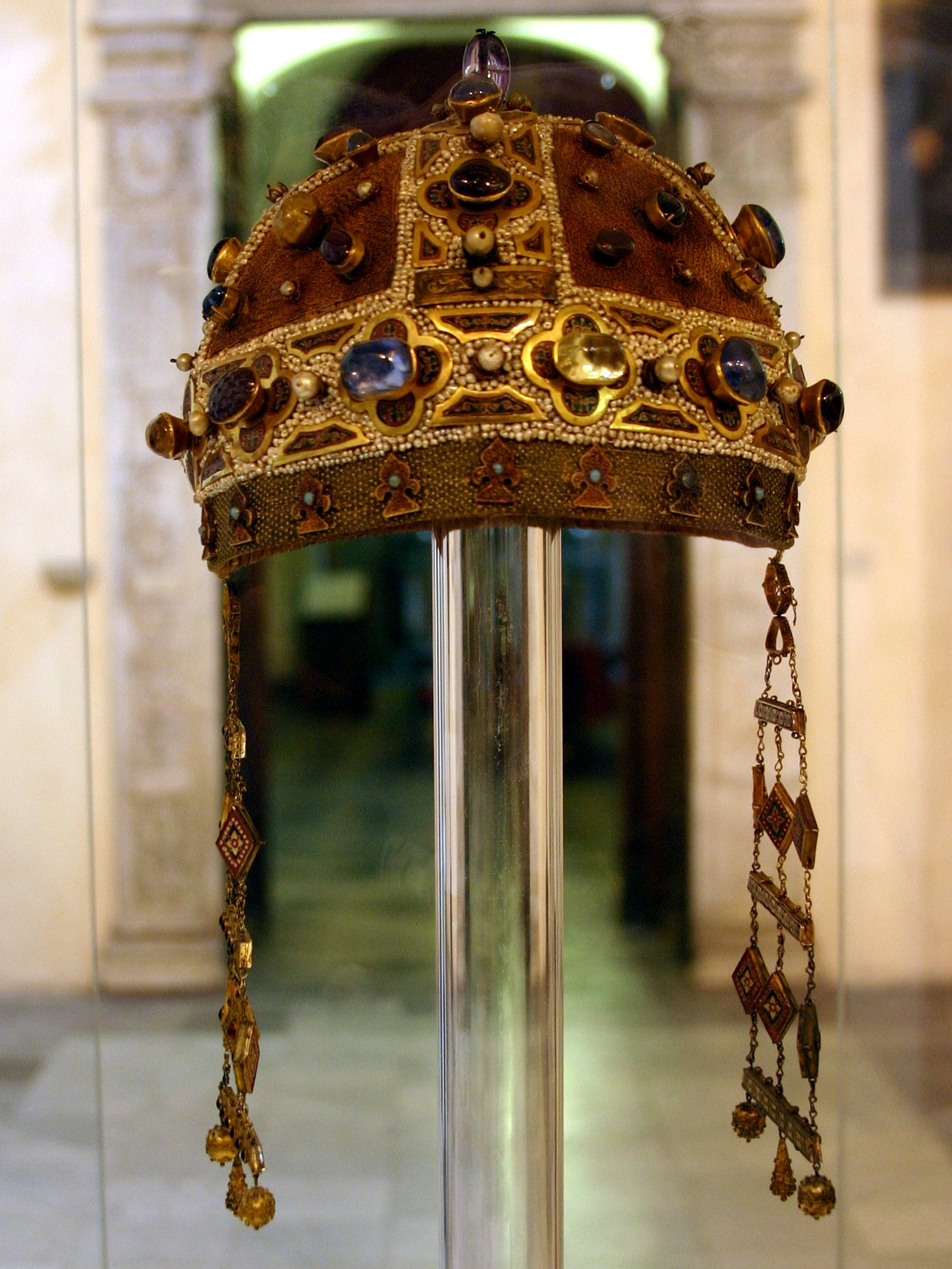
Crown of Constance of Aragon, Holy Roman Empress and Queen of the Romans

The Holy Roman Empress or Empress of the Holy Roman Empire (Kaiserin des Heiligen Römischen Reiches) was the wife or widow of the Holy Roman Emperor. The elective dignity of Holy Roman emperor was restricted to males only, but some empresses, such as Theophanu and Maria Theresa, were de facto rulers of the Empire.

== Holy Roman Empresses ==
Before 924, the title of emperor was not always associated with the German kingdom; rather, it was initially associated with the Carolingian dynasty, and then possessed by several other figures of the 9th and 10th centuries. Their wives were thus empresses, but not necessarily German queens.

== Carolingian ==
Picture	Name	Father	Birth	Marriage	Became Queen	Became Empress	Ceased to be Consort	Death	Spouse
	Ermengarde of Hesbaye; Queen of the Franks, Empress	Ingram, Count of Hesbaye (Robertians)	c. 778	794/795	Queen of Aquitaine 794/795; Queen of the Franks 28 January 814	813 husband as co-Emperor with his father/ 28 January 814 husband as sole Emperor	3 October 818		Louis I
	Judith of Bavaria; Queen of the Franks, Empress	Welf, Count of Altdorf (Welfs)	797	819			20 June 840 husband's death	19/23 April 843	Louis I
	Ermengarde of Tours; Queen of Italy and the Middle Franks, Empress	Hugh, Count of Tours (Etichonids)	?	821	Queen of Italy 17 April 818; Queen of Middle Francia August 843	821 husband as co-Emperor with his father/ 20 June 840 husband as sole Emperor	851		Lothair I
	Engelberga of Parma; Queen of Italy, Empress	Adelchis I, Count of Parma (Supponids)	?	5 October 851	Queen of Italy 5 October 851	5 October 851 husband as co-Emperor with his father/ 23 September 855 husband as sole Emperor	12 August 875 husband's death	896-901	Louis II
	Richilde of Provence; Queen of the West Franks, Empress	Bivin, Count of the Ardennes (Bosonids)	845	870	Queen of the West Franks 870	29 December 875	5/6 October 877 husband's death	2 June 910	Charles the Bald
	Richardis; Queen of the Franks, Empress	Erchanger, count of Nordgau (Ahalolfings)	c. 840	862	Various	12 February 881	As Queen: 11 November 887 husband's deposition as King; As Empress: 13 January 888 husband's death	18 September, 894-896	Charles the Fat
	Ageltrude; Queen of Italy, Empress	Adelchis, Prince of Benevento	?	before 880	Queen of Italy 889	May 891	12 December 894 husband's death	27 August 923	Guy III of Spoleto
	Ota	Berengar I of Neustria (Conradines)	?	888		22 February 896	8 December 899	30 November 903	Arnulf
	Anna of Constantinople	Leo VI the Wise (Macedonian)	888	around 900	900 in Provence (Lower Burgundy); 12 October 900 in Italy	15/22 February 901	21 July 905 in the Empire and Italy; 912 in Provence	912	Louis the Blind
	Bertila of Spoleto; Queen of Italy, Empress	Suppo II, Count of Parma (Supponids)	860	c. 880	Queen of Italy 26 December 887 husband's restoration	January 915	before December 915		Berengar I of Italy
	Anna of Provence; Queen of Italy, Empress	Louis the Blind, Emperor, King of Provence and Italy (Bosonids)	-	by December 915		7 April 924 husband's death	after May 930		Berengar I of Italy
Picture	Name	House	Birth	Marriage	Became Queen	Became Empress	Ceased to be Consort	Death	Spouse

== Holy Roman Empresses / Queens of Germany ==
With the elevation of Otto I of Germany in 962 to the Imperial title, the title of Roman King or Emperor became inalienably associated with the Kingdom of Germany - although a King of Germany might not bear the title of Emperor, it would be impossible to become a Holy Roman Emperor without being King of Germany first. The women in the following sections were all Queens of Germany as well as Holy Roman Empresses.

== Ottonian dynasty ==
Picture	Name	Father	Birth	Marriage	Became Queen	Became Empress	Ceased to be Consort	Death	Spouse
	Adelaide of Italy	Rudolph II of Burgundy (Welf)	931	951		2 February 962 (Crowned on this date) Served as regent for her grandson Otto III until he came of age.	7 May 973	16 December 999	Otto I
	Theophanu of Byzantium	Konstantinos Skleros	960	14 April 972		14 April 972 husband as co-Emperor with his father 7 May 973 husband as sole Emperor; Crowned 14 April 972	7 December 983 husband's death	15 June 991	Otto II
	Cunigunde of Luxembourg	Siegfried, Count of Luxemburg	c. 975	999	17 June 1002	26 April 1014	13 July 1024	3 March 1033	Henry II
Picture	Name	Father	Birth	Marriage	Became Queen	Became Empress	Ceased to be Consort	Death	Spouse

== Salian dynasty ==
Picture	Name	Father	Birth	Marriage	Became Queen	Became Empress	Ceased to be Consort	Death	Spouse
	Gisela of Swabia	Hermann II, Duke of Swabia (Conradines)	11 November 995	1016	8 September 1024	26 March 1027	4 June 1039 husband's death	14 February 1043	Conrad II
	Agnes of Poitou	William V, Duke of Aquitaine (Ramnulfids)	1025	21 November 1043		25 December 1046	5 October 1056	14 December 1077	Henry III
Bertha of Savoy, the Holy Roman Empress	Bertha of Savoy	Otto, Count of Savoy (Savoy)	21 September 1051	13 July 1066		21 March 1084	27 December 1087		Henry IV
	Eupraxia of Kiev	Vsevolod I, Grand Prince of Kiev (Rurikids)	1071	14 August 1089			31 December 1105 husband's deposition	20 July 1109	Henry IV
	Matilda of England	Henry I of England (Normandy)	7 February 1101	7 January 1114			23 May 1125	10 September 1167	Henry V
Picture	Name	Father	Birth	Marriage	Became Queen	Became Empress	Ceased to be Consort	Death	Spouse

== House of Supplinburg ==
Picture	Name	Father	Birth	Marriage	Became Queen	Became Empress	Ceased to be Consort	Death	Spouse
	Richenza of Northeim	Henry, Margrave of Frisia	c. 1087/89	c. 1100	30 August 1125	4 June 1133	4 December 1137	10 June 1141	Lothair III
Picture	Name	Father	Birth	Marriage	Became Queen	Became Empress	Ceased to be Consort	Death	Spouse

== House of Hohenstaufen ==
Picture	Name	Father	Birth	Marriage	Became Queen	Became Empress	Ceased to be Consort	Death	Spouse
	Beatrice of Burgundy	Renaud III, Count of Burgundy	1143	9 June 1156			15 November 1184		Frederick I
	Constance of Sicily	Roger II, King of Sicily (Hauteville)	1154	27 January 1186		14 April 1191	28 September 1197	27 November 1198	Henry VI
Picture	Name	Father	Birth	Marriage	Became Queen	Became Empress	Ceased to be Consort	Death	Spouse

== House of Welf ==
Picture	Name	Father	Birth	Marriage	Became Queen	Became Empress	Ceased to be Consort	Death	Spouse
	Beatrice of Swabia	Philip, King of Germany (Hohenstaufen)	1198	1209 or 1212			1212		Otto IV
	Marie of Brabant	Henry I, Duke of Brabant	c. 1190	after 19 May 1214			5 July 1215 husband's deposition	May 1260	Otto IV
Picture	Name	Father	Birth	Marriage	Became Queen	Became Empress	Ceased to be Consort	Death	Spouse

== House of Hohenstaufen ==
Picture	Name	Father	Birth	Marriage	Became Queen	Became Empress	Ceased to be Consort	Death	Spouse
	Constance of Aragon	Alfonso II, King of Aragon	1179	5 August 1209	1211-1212 husband as King in opposition/ 5 July 1215 husband unopposed	22 November 1220	23 April 1220; Ceased to be Queen: son elected as King	23 June 1222; Ceased to be Empress upon death	Frederick II
	Yolande of Brienne	John of Brienne, King of Jerusalem	1212	9 November 1225			25 April 1228		Frederick II
	Isabella of England	John, King of England	1214	15/20 July 1235			1 December 1241		Frederick II
Picture	Name	House	Father	Marriage	Became Queen	Became Empress	Ceased to be Consort	Death	Spouse

== House of Wittelsbach ==
Picture	Name	Father	Birth	Marriage	Became Queen	Became Empress	Ceased to be Consort	Death	Spouse
	Margaret II, Countess of Hainault	William of Avesnes, Count of Hainaut	1311	26 February 1324		January 1328	11 October 1347	23 June 1356	Louis IV
Picture	Name	Father	Birth	Marriage	Became Queen	Became Empress	Ceased to be Consort	Death	Spouse

== House of Luxembourg ==
Picture	Name	Father	Birth	Marriage	Became Queen	Became Empress	Ceased to be Consort	Death	Spouse
	Anna of Świdnica	Henry II, Duke of Świdnica	c. 1339	27 May 1353		5 April 1355 coronation with husband	11 July 1362		Charles IV
	Elizabeth of Pomerania	Bogislaw V, Duke of Pomerania	1347	21 May 1363		1 November 1368 coronation	29 November 1378 husband's death	14 February 1393	Charles IV
	Barbara of Cilli	Hermann II, Count of Celje	1390 to 1395	1408	21 July 1411 husband's election	31 May 1433 husband's coronation	9 December 1437 husband's death	11 July 1451	Sigismund
Picture	Name	Father	Birth	Marriage	Became Queen	Became Empress	Ceased to be Consort	Death	Spouse

== House of Habsburg ==
Picture	Name	Father	Birth	Marriage	Became Queen	Became Empress	Ceased to be Consort	Death	Spouse
	Leonor of Portugal	Edward of Portugal (Aviz)	18 September 1434	16 March 1452		19 March 1452 husband's coronation	3 September 1467		Frederick III
	Bianca Maria Sforza of Milan	Galeazzo Maria, Duke of Milan (Sforza)	5 April 1472	16 March 1494		4 February 1508 husband declared "emperor-elect"	31 December 1510		Maximilian I
	Isabella of Portugal	Manuel I of Portugal (Aviz)	23 October 1503	10 March 1526		24 February 1530 husband's coronation	1 May 1539		Charles V
	Maria of Austria	Emperor Charles V (Habsburg)	21 June 1528	13 September 1548	November 1562 husband's election	25 July 1564 husband's ascension	12 October 1576 husband's death	26 February 1603	Maximilian II
	Anna of Austria	Ferdinand II, Archduke of Austria (Habsburg)	4 October 1585	4 December 1611	13 June 1612 husband's election		14 December 1618		Matthias
	Eleonora Gonzaga	Vincenzo I, Duke of Mantua (Gonzaga)	23 September 1598	4 February 1622			15 February 1637 husband's death	27 June 1655	Ferdinand II
	Maria Anna of Austria	Philip III of Spain (Habsburg)	18 August 1606	20 February 1631	22 December 1636 husband's election	15 February 1637 husband's ascension	13 May 1646		Ferdinand III
	Maria Leopoldine of Austria	Leopold V, Archduke of Austria (Habsburg)	6 April 1632	2 July 1648			7 August 1649		Ferdinand III
	Eleanora Gonzaga	Charles II Gonzaga, Duke of Nevers (Gonzaga)	18 November 1630	30 April 1651			2 April 1657 husband's death	6 December 1686	Ferdinand III
	Margarita Teresa of Austria	Philip IV of Spain (Habsburg)	12 July 1651	12 December 1666			12 March 1673		Leopold I
	Claudia Felicitas of Austria	Archduke Ferdinand Charles of Austria (Habsburg)	30 May 1653	15 October 1673			8 April 1676		Leopold I
	Eleonore Magdalene of Neuburg	Philip William, Elector Palatine (Wittelsbach)	6 January 1655	14 December 1676			5 May 1705 husband's death	19 January 1720	Leopold I
	Wilhelmina Amalia of Brunswick	John Frederick, Duke of Calenburg (Welf)	21 April 1673	24 February 1699		5 May 1705 husband's ascension	17 April 1711 husband's death	10 April 1742	Joseph I
	Elisabeth Christine of Brunswick-Wolfenbüttel	Louis Rudolph, Duke of Brunswick-Wolfenbüttel (Welf)	28 August 1691	1 August 1708	December 1711 husband's election		20 October 1740 husband's death	21 December 1750	Charles VI
Picture	Name	Father	Birth	Marriage	Became Queen	Became Empress	Ceased to be Consort	Death	Spouse

== House of Wittelsbach ==
Picture	Name	Father	Birth	Marriage	Became Queen	Became Empress	Ceased to be Consort	Death	Spouse
	Maria Amalia of Austria	Emperor Joseph I (Habsburg)	22 October 1701	5 October 1722	24 January 1742 husband's election		20 January 1745 husband's death	11 December 1756	Charles VII
Picture	Name	Father	Birth	Marriage	Became Queen	Became Empress	Ceased to be Consort	Death	Spouse

== House of Lorraine ==
Picture	Name	Father	Birth	Marriage	Became Queen	Became Empress	Ceased to be Consort	Death	Spouse
	Maria Theresa of Austria	Emperor Charles VI (Habsburg)	13 May 1717	12 February 1736	13 September 1745 husband's election		18 August 1765 husband's death	29 November 1780	Francis I
Picture	Name	Father	Birth	Marriage	Became Queen	Became Empress	Ceased to be Consort	Death	Spouse

== House of Habsburg-Lorraine ==
Picture	Name	Father	Birth	Marriage	Became Queen	Became Empress	Ceased to be Consort	Death	Spouse
	Maria Josepha of Bavaria	Emperor Charles VII (Wittelsbach)	30 March 1739	23 January 1765		18 August 1765 husband's ascension	28 May 1767		Joseph II
	Maria Luisa of Spain	Charles III of Spain (Bourbon)	24 November 1745	5 August 1765	30 September 1790 husband's election		1 March 1792 husband's death	15 May 1792	Leopold II
	Maria Theresa of the Two Sicilies	Ferdinand I of the Two Sicilies (Bourbon)	6 June 1772	15 August 1790	5 July 1792 husband's election		6 August 1806 husband's abdication	13 April 1807	Francis II
Picture	Name	Father	Birth	Marriage	Became Queen	Became Empress	Ceased to be Consort	Death	Spouse

== See also ==
- List of Roman Empresses (24 BC–AD 1453).
- List of Austrian Empresses (1804–1918).
- List of German queens
- List of Italian queens
- List of Burgundian consorts
