= Bertha, Abbess of Santa Giulia in Brescia =

Bertha

Abbess of Santa Giulia in Brescia
- Reign: 908-952

Abbess of San Sisto in Piacenza
- Reign: 917-952
- Born: c. 880
- Died: after 952
- House: Unruochings
- Father: Berengar I of Italy
- Mother: Bertila of Spoleto
- Religion: Catholic Church

Bertha (also Berta) (c.880-after 952), was the daughter of Berengar I of Italy and his wife Bertila of Spoleto. She was abbess of Santa Giulia in Brescia from at least 908 to her death, and of San Sisto in Piacenza from at least 917 to her death.

== Family ==
Bertha was a member of the Unruoching dynasty. Her parents were Berengar I, King of Italy and Bertila. Her sister was Gisela of Friuli, whose son Berengar II later became king of Italy.

== Abbess of Santa Giulia in Brescia ==
A letter from Archbishop John of Ravenna indicates that Bertha was already abbess of Santa Giulia in Brescia by 908. The monastery of Santa Giulia (previously San Salvatore) in Brescia was one of the richest and most influential female religious houses in northern Italy. It was closely connected with royal women, including Engelberga, Bertha's maternal great-aunt.

In 915 and 916 Berengar made two separate grants, at Bertha's request: one to her monastery of Santa Giulia in Brescia, and the other granting Bertha the right to build a castle in Pavia.

== Abbess of San Sisto in Piacenza ==
A diploma issued by Berengar in 917 indicates that in addition to Santa Giulia in Brescia, Bertha was now also the abbess of San Sisto in Piacenza, which had been founded by her aunt, Engelberga.

Successive kings of Italy made grants to San Sisto whilst Bertha was abbess: Rudolf II in 924, Hugh in 926 and Bertha's nephew, Berengar II and his son, Adalbert in 951.
