= Adelaide of Italy =

Holy Roman Empress, Catholic saint (931–999)

Saint Adelaide of Italy
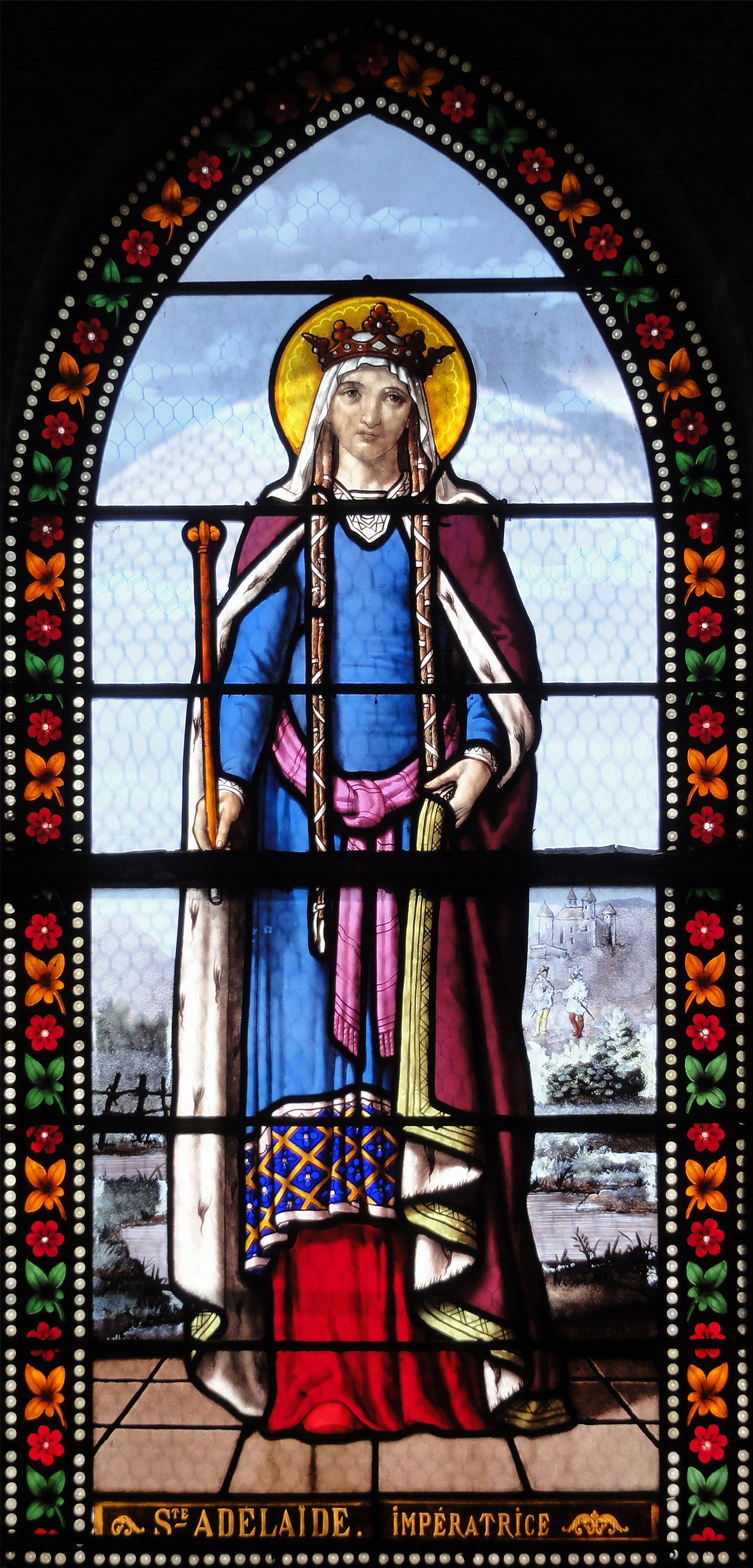
- Born: 931; Orbe, Upper Burgundy
- Died: 16 December 999 (aged 68); Seltz, Alsace
- Venerated in: Catholic Church; Eastern Orthodox Church
- Canonized: 1097 by Pope Urban II (Catholicism)
- Feast: 16 December
- Attributes: dispensing alms and food to the poor, often beside a ship

Adelaide of Italy

Holy Roman Empress
- Tenure: 2 February 962 – 7 May 973

Queen consort of Italy
- Tenure: before 27 June 947/947 – 950
- Spouse: Lothair II of Italy (m. 947, died 950) Otto I, Holy Roman Emperor (m. 951, died 973)
- Issue: Emma, Queen of West Francia; Matilda, Abbess of Quedlinburg; Otto II, Holy Roman Emperor
- House: Elder House of Welf
- Father: Rudolph II of Burgundy
- Mother: Bertha of Swabia

Adelaide of Italy (German: Adelheid; 931 – 16 December 999 AD), also called Adelaide of Burgundy, was Holy Roman Empress by marriage to Emperor Otto the Great. She was crowned with him by Pope John XII in Rome on 2 February 962. She was the first German queen more consistently designated as consors regni, denoting a "co-bearer of royalty" who shared power with her husband. She was essential as a model for future consorts regarding both status and political influence. She was regent of the Holy Roman Empire as the guardian of her grandson in 991–995.

== Life ==
=== Early life ===
Adelaide was born in Orbe Castle, Orbe, Kingdom of Upper Burgundy (now in modern-day Switzerland), to Rudolf II of Burgundy, a member of the Elder House of Welf, and Bertha of Swabia.

Adelaide was involved from the outset in the complicated fight to control not only Burgundy but also Lombardy. The battle between her father Rudolf II and Berengar I to control northern Italy ended with Berengar's death, enabling Rudolf to claim the throne.

Not happy with this, the inhabitants of Lombardy appealed to another ally, Hugh of Provence, who had long considered Rudolf an enemy. Although Hugh challenged Rudolf for the Burgundian throne, he only succeeded when Adelaide's father died in 937. So as to control Upper Burgundy, Hugh decided to marry his son Lothair II, the nominal King of Italy, to the 15-year-old Adelaide (in 947, before 27 June).

The marriage produced a daughter, Emma of Italy, born about 948. Emma became Queen of West Francia by marrying King Lothair of France.

=== Marriage and alliance with Otto I ===
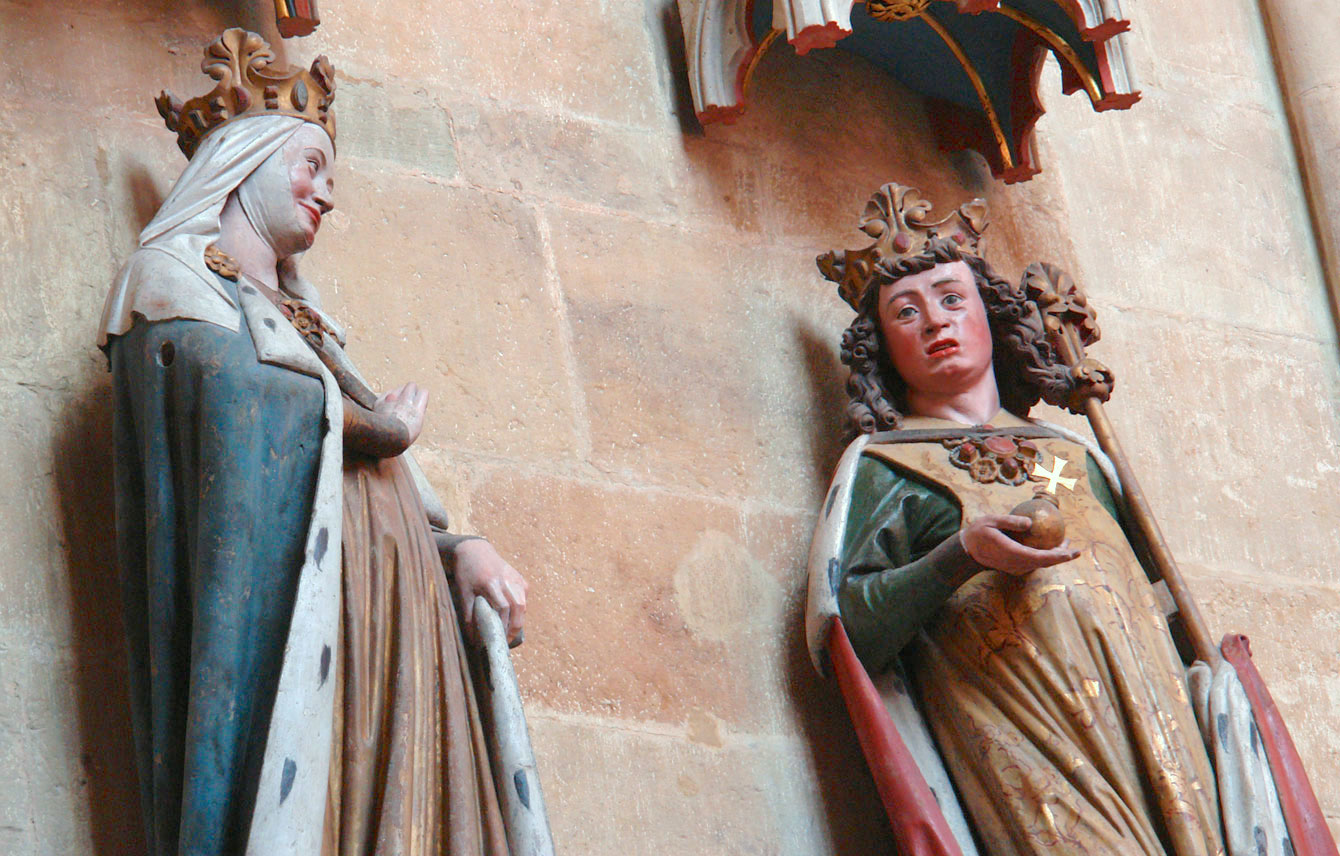
Statues of Adelaide and her second spouse Otto I, the donors of Meissen Cathedral

The calendar of saints states that Lothair was poisoned on 22 November 950 in Turin by the holder of real power, his successor, Berengar II of Italy.

There were some suspicions amongst the people of Lombardy that Adelaide wanted to rule the kingdom by herself. Berengar attempted to thwart this and cement his political power by forcing her to marry his son Adalbert. Adelaide refused and fled, taking refuge in the castle of Como. However, she was quickly tracked down and was imprisoned for four months at Garda.

According to Adelaide's contemporary biographer, Odilo of Cluny, she managed to escape from captivity. After a time spent in the marshes nearby, she was rescued by a priest and taken to a "certain impregnable fortress," likely the fortified town of Canossa Castle near Reggio. She was able to send an emissary to the East Frankish king Otto I asking for his protection. Adelaide met Otto at the old Lombard capital of Pavia and they married on 23 September 951. Early in their marriage, Adelaide and Otto had two children, Henry and Bruno, both of whom died before reaching adulthood.

A few years later, in 953, Liudolf, Duke of Swabia, Otto's son by his first marriage, instigated a big revolt that was quelled by his father. As a consequence, Otto decided to dispossess Liudolf of his ducal title. This decision favoured the position of Adelaide and her descendants at court. Adelaide also managed to retain her entire territorial dowry.

After returning to Germany with his new wife, Otto cemented the Holy Roman Empire by defeating the Hungarian invaders at the Battle of Lechfeld on 10 August 955. He then extended the boundaries of East Francia beyond the Elbe River, defeating the Obotrites and other Slavs of the Elbe at the battle of Recknitz on 16 October 955. That same year, Adelaide gave birth to Otto II. In 955 or 956, she gave birth to a daughter who would become Matilda, Abbess of Quedlinburg.

=== Holy Roman Empress ===
Adelaide accompanied her husband on his second expedition to Italy to subdue the revolt of Berengar II and to protect Pope John XII. In Rome, Otto the Great was crowned Holy Roman Emperor on 2 February 962 by Pope John XII. Breaking new ground, Pope John XII also crowned Adelaide as Holy Roman Empress. In 960, a new ordo was created for her coronation and anointing, including prayers to biblical female figures, especially Esther. The ordo presents a theological and political concept that legitimizes the empress's status as a divinely ordained component of the earthly rule. In 966, Adelaide and the eleven-year-old Otto II, travelled again with Otto on his third expedition to Italy, where the Emperor restored the newly elected Pope John XIII to his throne (and executed some of the Roman rioters who had deposed him). Crucial to Otto's establishing legitimacy in his conquest of Italy and in bringing the imperial crown to the couple, was the support of Adelaide and her extensive network of relations. As heir to the Italian throne, Adelaide established for late Carolingian traditions the legitimate claim over Italy by the imperial throne.

Adelaide remained in Rome for six years while Otto ruled his kingdom from Italy. Otto II was crowned co-emperor in 967, then married the Byzantine princess Theophanu in April 972, resolving the conflict between the two empires in southern Italy and ensuring the imperial succession. Adelaide and her husband returned to Germany, where Otto I died in May 973, at the same Memleben palace where his father had died 37 years earlier.

After her coronation, which increased her power as she was now consors regni and able to receive people from the entire Empire, Adelaide's interventions in political decisions increased. According to Buchinger, "Between 962 and 972 Adelheid appears as intervenient in seventy-five charters. Additionally Adelheid and Otto I are named together in Papal bulls". She often protected the ecclesiastic institutions, seemingly to gain a sphere of influence separate from that of her husband. Between 991 and 993, the brothers of Feuchtwang wrote to her and requested to be "protected by the shadow of your rule from now on, we may be safe from the tumults of secular attacks". They promised they would pray for her so that her reign would be long and stable.

Adelaide wielded a great amount of power during her husband's reign, as evidenced by several requests made to her. A letter, written in the 980s by her daughter Emma demanded that Adelaide intervene against Emma's enemies and mobilize forces in the Ottonian Empire. She also asked that Adelaide capture Hugh Capet, who was already elected king of West Frankia in 987. Another enemy of Emma's was Charles, the brother of Emma's deceased consort Lothar, who had accused his sister-in-law of adultery. Another pleader was Gerbert of Aurillac, at that time archbishop of Reims (the later Pope Sylvester II), who wrote to Adelaide to ask for protection against his enemies. Buchinger remarks that, "These examples are remarkable, because they imply that Adelheid had the possibilities to help in both cases or at least Emma and Gerbert do believe that she could have intervened and succeeded. Both are themselves important political figures in their realm and still they rely on Adelheid. Adelheid’s power and importance must have been extremely stable and reliable to do as wished by the pleaders."

=== Otto II's era ===
In the years following Otto I's death, Adelaide exerted a powerful influence at court. However, Adelaide was in conflict with her daughter-in-law, the Byzantine princess Theophanu, as only one woman could be queen and hold the associated functions and powers at court. Adelaide was able to maintain the title imperatrix augusta even though Theophanu now also used it. Moreover, Theophanu opposed Adelaide in the use of her dowry lands, which Adelaide wanted to continue to use and donate to ecclesiastical institutions, ensuring her power base. Adelaide had the right to make transactions of her Italian lands as she pleased, but she needed the permission of the emperor to use her Ottonian lands. Adelaide also sided with her extended kin against Otto II. Wilson compares this action with those of other royal women: "Royal women possessed agency and did not always do the bidding of male relatives. Engelberge greatly influenced her husband, Emperor Louis II, in his attempts to extend imperial control to southern Italy in the 870s. Matilda’s favouritism for her younger son Heinrich caused Otto I considerable trouble, while Adelaide sided with her extended kin against her own son, Otto II, until he temporarily exiled her to Burgundy in 978. Agency was clearest during regencies, because these lacked formal rules, offering scope for forceful personalities to assert themselves." After being expelled from court by Otto II in 978, she divided her time between living in Italy in the royal palace of Pavia and Arles with her brother Conrad I, King of Burgundy, through whom she was finally reconciled with her son. In 983 (shortly before his death) Otto II appointed her his viceroy in Italy.

=== Regency ===
In 983, her son Otto II died and was succeeded by Adelaide's grandson Otto III under the regency of Theophanu while Adelaide remained in Italy. For some time, Adelaide and Theophanu were able to put aside their separate interests and work together to ensure Otto III's succession. This is seen through their joint appearance in the charters. According to the Annales Quedlinburgenses, after Otto II's death, Henry, duke of Bavaria kidnapped Otto III. The narrative claims that Adelaide returned from Lombardy to join with Theophanu, Matilda, and other leaders of Europe and reclaim the child.

When Theophanu died in 991, Adelaide assumed regency on behalf of Otto III until he reached legal majority three years later. Adelaide's role in establishing Otto's position can be seen in a letter Otto III wrote to his grandmother in 996: "According to your [Adelheid’s] wishes and desires, the divinity has conferred the rights of an empire on us [Otto III] with a happy outcome".

Troubles in the East continued under Adelaide, as Boleslaus of Bohemia wavered in his loyalty. In 992, there was war between Bohemia and Poland, and again like in Theophanu's time, the Ottonian regime sided with Poland. Jestice comments that, "Christianity was not re-established in the land of the Liutizi during their lifetimes. But there were territorial gains, and by 987 it was possible to begin rebuilding destroyed fortresses along the Elbe". A Saxon army, with Otto III's presence, took Brandenburg in 991. The Hildesheim annal reports that there was another expedition in 992.

Thietmar of Merseburg reports that Otto III dismissed his grandmother after his mother's death, but Althoff doubts this story. Even after Otto attained majority, Adelaide often accompanied him in his travels and influenced him, along with other women.

In Burgundy, Adelaide's homeland, the counts and castellans behaved increasingly independently from their king Rudolph III. Just before her death in 999, she had to intervene in Burgundy to restore peace.

=== Later years ===
Adelaide resigned as regent when Otto III was declared to be of the legal majority in 994. From then on, she devoted herself exclusively to her works of charity, in particular to the foundation and restoration of religious houses, i.e. monasteries, churches and abbeys.

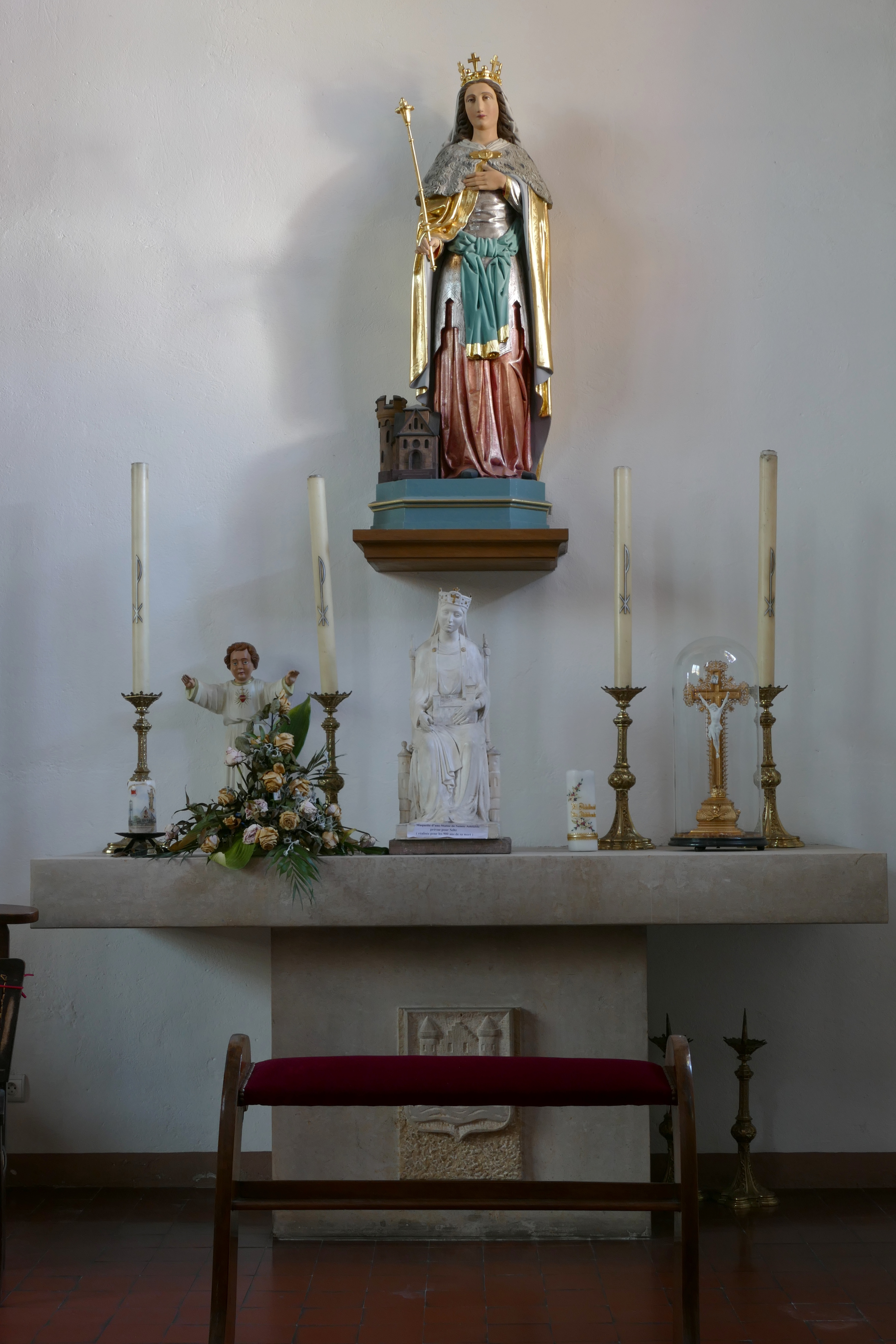
Chapel of St. Adelaide, Église Saint-Étienne de Seltz

Adelaide had long entertained close relations with Cluny, then the center of the movement for ecclesiastical reform, and in particular with its abbots Majolus and Odilo. She retired to a nunnery she had founded in c. 991 at Selz in Alsace.

On her way to Burgundy to support her nephew Rudolf III against a rebellion, she died at Selz Abbey on 16 December 999, days short of the millennium she thought would bring the Second Coming of Christ. She was buried in the Abbey and Pope Urban II canonized her in 1097. After serious flooding, which almost completely destroyed it in 1307, Adelaide's relics were moved elsewhere. A goblet reputed to have belonged to Saint Adelaide has long been preserved in Seltz.; it was used to give potions to people with fever and the healings were said to have been numerous.

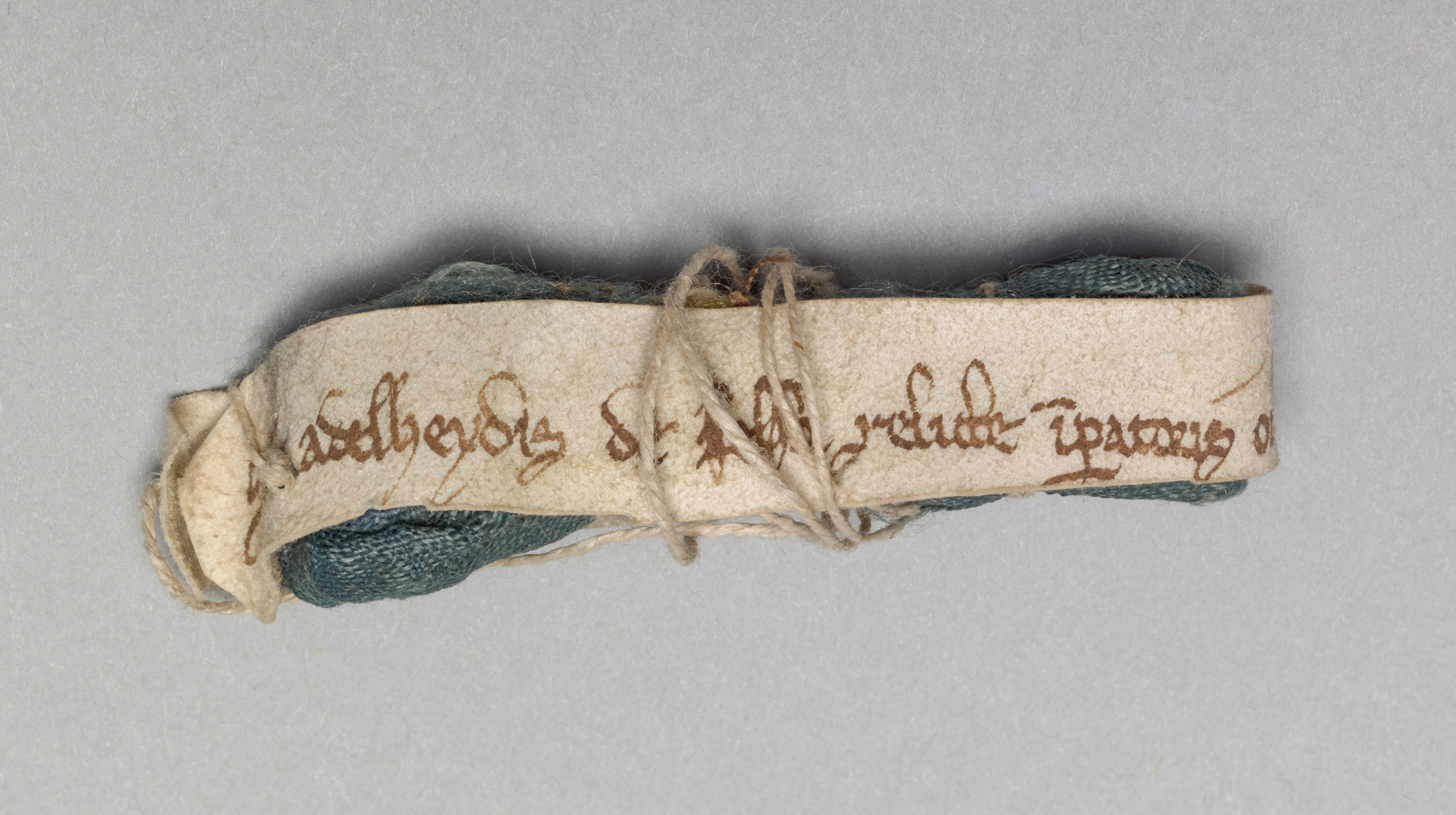
Relic attributed to St. Adelaide

Adelaide constantly devoted herself to the service of the church and peace, and to the empire as guardian of both; she also interested herself in the conversion of the Slavs. She was thus a principal agent – almost an embodiment – of the work of the pre-schism Church at the end of the Early Middle Ages in the construction of the religious culture of Central Europe. Some of her relics are preserved in a shrine in Hanover. Her feast day, 16 December, is still kept in many German dioceses.

== Issue ==
In 947, Adelaide was married to King Lothair II of Italy. The union produced one child:

- Emma of Italy (948 – after 987), queen of France and wife of Lothair of France

In 951, Adelaide was married to King Otto I, the future Holy Roman Emperor. The union produced four children:

- Henry (952 – 7 April 954)
- Bruno (953 – 8 September 957)
- Matilda (early 955 – † 6 February 999), the first Princess-Abbess of Quedlinburg
- Otto II (end 955 – 7 December 983), later Holy Roman Emperor.

== Historiography and cultural depictions ==
=== Historiography ===
Adelaide was one of the most important and powerful medieval female rulers. Historically, as empress and saint, she has been described as powerful, with both male attributes (like strength, justness and prudence) and female attributes (piety, self denying). Modern German historiography tends to focus on her contributions to the Ottonian dynasty and the development of the Holy Roman Empire.

=== Depictions in art ===
Adelaide is usually represented in the garb of an empress, with sceptre and crown. Since the 14th century, she is also given as an attribute a model church or a ship (by which she is said to have escaped from captivity).

The most famous representation of Adelaide in German art belongs to a group of sandstone figures in the choir of Meissen Cathedral, which was created around 1260. She is shown here with her husband, who was not canonized, since he founded the diocese of Meissen with her.

==== Operas ====
- Adelaide of Burgundy is the main character of the opera l'Adelaide (1672) by Antonio Sartorio.
- Adelaide is the subject of a 1723 opera by Nicola Porpora, where she was played by the great castrato Farinelli en travesti.
- Lotario is a 1729 opera seria in three acts by George Frideric Handel. It is a fictionalisation of some events in the life of Adelaide.
- Adelaide is the heroine of Adelaide di Borgogna, an opera with two acts (1817) by Gioachino Rossini (music) and Giovanni Schmidt (libretto).
- Adelaide is the heroine of William Bernard McCabe's 1856 novel Adelaide, Queen of Italy, or The Iron Crown.

==== Books and novels ====
- Adelheid, Mutter der Königreiche (Adelaide, Mother of Kingdoms) published in 1936 by Gertrud Bäumer.
- Die fremde Königin (The Foreign Queen), published in 2017, Adelaide is one of the central characters in Rebecca Gablé's novel.
- Empress Adelheid and Countess Matilda: medieval female rulership and the foundations of European society by Penelope Nash (2017).
- Imperial ladies of the Ottonian Dynasty: women and rule in tenth-century Germany by Phyllis G. Jestice (2018)
- God's Maidservant: The story of Adelaide of Italy (Women of the Dark Ages) by Anna Chant (2017)

==== Artwork ====
- San Giuseppe con Gesù Bambino tra Sant'Adelaide, Sant'Antonio da Padova, San Lupo e San Michele arcangelo by Francesco Coghetti, 1828
- Adelaide is a featured figure on Judy Chicago's installation piece The Dinner Party, being represented as one of the 999 names on the Heritage Floor, with the related place setting of Theodora (wife of Justinian I).

== See also ==
- List of Eastern Orthodox saints
- List of Holy Roman empresses
- List of Catholic saints
- Saint Adelaide, patron saint archive

== Sources ==
- Althoff, Gerd (1 November 2010). Otto III. Penn State Press. ISBN 978-0-271-04618-1.
- Bouchard, Constance Brittain (1995). "Burgundy and Provence, 879–1032". The New Cambridge Medieval History. Vol. 3, C.900 – c.1024. Cambridge University Press.
- Campbell, Thomas (1907). "St. Adelaide". The Catholic Encyclopedia. Vol. 1. Robert Appleton Company.
- Gallick, Sarah (2009). The big book of women saints. Pymble, NSW: HarperCollins e-books. ISBN 978-0061956560.
- Holböck, Ferdinand (2002). Married Saints and Blesseds: Through the Centuries. Translated by Miller, Michael J. Ignatius Press.
- Jestice, Phyllis G. (2018). Imperial ladies of the Ottonian Dynasty: women and rule in tenth-century Germany. Palgrave Macmillan. ISBN 978-3-319-77305-6.
- Müller-Mertens, Eckhard (1995). "The Ottonians as kings and emperors". The New Cambridge Medieval History. Vol. 3, C.900 – c.1024. Cambridge University Press.
- Odilo of Cluny (2004). "Epitaph of Adelheid". In Gilsdorf (ed.). Queenship and Sanctity. Catholic University of America Press.
- Reuter, Timothy; McKitterick, Rosamond, eds. (1999). "Appendix". The New Cambridge Medieval History: Volume 3, C.900-c.1024. Cambridge University Press.
- Vauchez, Andre (1990). "The Saint". In Le Goff, Jacques (ed.). Medieval Callings. University of Chicago Press.
- Wilson, Peter H. (2016). The Holy Roman Empire: A Thousand Years of Europe's History. Penguin Books Limited. ISBN 978-0-14-195691-6.

== Bibliography ==
- Henry Gardiner Adams, ed. (1857). "Adelaide" . A Cyclopaedia of Female Biography: 8. Wikidata Q115297284 – via Wikisource.
- Friedrich Wilhelm Bautz: Adelheid of Burgundy. In: Biographical-Bibliographical Dictionary of Churches (BBKL). Volume 1, Bautz, Hamm 1975. 2nd, unchanged edition Hamm 1990, ISBN 3-88309-013-1, Sp. 35–35.
- Amalie Fößel: Adelheid. In: Amalie Fößel (Ed.): The Empresses of the Middle Ages. Pustet, Regensburg 2011, ISBN 978-3-7917-2360-0, p. 35–59.
- Werner Goez: Empress Adelheid. In: Pictures of life from the Middle Ages. The time of the Ottonians, Salians and Staufers. Primus, Darmstadt 2010, ISBN 978-3-89678-701-9, p. 66–82.
- Bruno Keiser: Adelheid. Queen, empress, saint. Piper Verlag, Munich 2009, ISBN 978-349-22548-9-2.
- Walter Schlesinger: Adelheid. In: New German Biography (NDB). Volume 1, Duncker & Humblot, Berlin 1953, ISBN 3-428-00182-6, p. 57 f. (digitized version).
- Franz Staab: Thorsten Unger (Ed.): Empress Adelheid and her monastery foundation in Selz (= Publications of the Palatinate Society for the Advancement of Science in Speyer. Vol. 99). Presentations at the scientific conference in Landau and Selz from 15 to 17 October 1999, published by the Society for the Advancement of Science, Speyer 2005, ISBN 3-932155-21-1.
- Ernst Steindorff: Adelheid (Empress). In: General German Biography (ADB). Volume 1, Duncker & Humblot, Leipzig 1875, pp. 75–77.
- Stefan Weinfurter: Empress Adelheid and the Ottonian Empire. In: Early Medieval Studies. Vol. 33, 1999, pp. 1–19, (digitised version).

Royal titles
Vacant Title last held by Edith of Wessex	Queen consort of Germany; 951–961	Succeeded by Theophanu
Vacant Title last held by Anna of Provence	Holy Roman Empress; 962–973	Succeeded by Theophanu
