= Suppo II of Spoleto =

Suppo II

Duke of Spoleto
- Reign: 871–876
- Predecessor: Lambert I
- Successor: Lambert I
- Died: c. 879
- Father: Adelchis I

Suppo II (also Suppo III in the familial genealogy) (Italian: Suppone) (died c. 879) was the Duke of Spoleto from 871 until his death. He was the archiminister (archminister) and consiliarius (counsellor) of the Emperor Louis II. In 869-870 he travelled to Constantinople as imperial missus together with Anastasius the Librarian, to negotiate a peace with the Byzantines. Throughout Louis's reign he was the most powerful lay magnate in Italy.

He was a member of the Supponid family and was related to Louis's empress, Engelberga, and also to Suppo, count of Parma, Asti, and Turin, his cousin. After Louis's death, at first he supported Carloman of Bavaria for the Italian throne. After Charles the Bald obtained the crown, he pacified with him but in February 876 he was stripped of the duchy of Spoleto, in favour of the previous duke, Lambert I.

Suppo III died between March 877, when he is mentioned in a document, and August 879, when a letter from Pope John VIII laments his death. Suppo's wife was a sister of Eberhard of Friuli and he had a son named Unroch, who in turn had a son named Rudolph.

== Sources ==
- Wickham, Chris. Early Medieval Italy: Central Power and Local Society 400-1000. MacMillan Press: 1981.
- Hlawitschka, Eduard. Franken, Alemannen, Bayern und Burgunder in Oberitalien (774-962), 1960

Italian nobility
Preceded by Lambert I	Duke of Spoleto; 871–876	Succeeded by Lambert I
