= Gesta Berengarii imperatoris =

Start of the Gesta in the Marciana manuscript, with the title in Greek

The Gesta Berengarii imperatoris (or "Deeds of the Emperor Berengar") is a Latin epic poem chronicling the career of Berengar of Friuli (d. 924), King of Italy from 887 and Emperor from 915. It follows Berengar's career from its inception (c. 874) until his imperial coronation in Rome in December 915. It is a court panegyric and highly laudatory of its namesake.

The poem is in four books, with a total of 1,090 hexameters. It was composed still during Berengar's lifetime, in the period 915–924. Its author may have been John, bishop of Cremona, who was Berengar's chancellor from 916. There are numerous parallels with Waltharius, but it remains unclear which of the two works has priority. Entire verses of "Berengar" were lifted from the Thebaid. It is preserved in Biblioteca Marciana, Venice, ms. lat. XII, 45 (= ms. 4165), a manuscript of the 11th century.

== Editions ==
- 1663. Henricus Valesius, Carmen panegyricum de laudibus Berengarii augusti et Adalberonis episcopi Laudunensis, Paris, pp. 19–56.
- 1707. Gottfried Wilhelm Leibniz, Incerti auctoris Carmen panegyricum in laudem Berengarii augusti, Scriptores rerum Brunsvicensium 1, pp. 235–256.
- 1841. Georg Heinrich Pertz, Monumenta Germaniae Historica t. VI (1841), pp. 189–210 (reprinted in PL 151, coll. 1285–1312).
- 1871. Ernst Dümmler, ed. Gesta Berengarii imperatoris. Halle: Verlag der Buchhandlung des Waisenhauses.
- 1899. P. von Winterfeld, MGH Poetae, 4/1, pp. 355–401.
- 2009. F. Stella (intr., transl., comm.)-G. Albertoni, Gesta Berengarii. Scontro per il regno nell'Italia del X secolo, Pisa, Pacini.

== Bibliography ==
- Previté-Orton, C. W. "Italy and Provence, 900-950." The English Historical Review, Vol. 32, No. 127. (Jul., 1917), pp 335-347.
- Reuter, Timothy (trans.) The Annals of Fulda. (Manchester Medieval series, Ninth-Century Histories, Volume II.) Manchester: Manchester University Press, 1992.
- E. Dümmler, Nachträge zu den Gesta Berengarii imperatoris, in Anselm der Peripatetiker, Halle 1872, pp. 107-111.
- E. Dümmler, Zu den Gesta Berengarii imperatoris, Forschungen zur deutschen Geschichte, 13, 1873, pp. 415-417.
- E. Bernheim, Der Glossator der Gesta Berengarii imperatoris, Forschungen zur deutschen Geschichte, 14, 1874, pp. 138-154
- F. Gabotto, Di alcuni passi male interpretati del libro II dei „Gesta Berengarii regis”, in: Raccolta di scritti storici in onore del prof. Giacinto Romano, Pavia 1907, pp. 339-361.
- F. Marani, Gesta Berengarii Imperatoris. Qualche osservazione linguistica e metrica, Archivum romanicum, 22, 1938, pp. 383-391.
- M. Lawo, „Gesta Berengarii“ und „Waltharius“, in: Arbor amoena comis. Festschrift zum 25jährigen Bestehen des Mittellateinischen Seminars der Universität Bonn, cur. E. Könsgen, Stuttgart 1990, pp. 101-111.
- B. H. Rosenwein, "The Family Politics of Berengar I, King of Italy (888-924)", Speculum (Cambridge, Mass.), 71, 1996, pp. 259-262, 278-281.
- P. Ch. Jacobsen, Gesta Berengarii und Waltharius-Epos, Deutsches Archiv für Erforschung des Mittelalters, 58, 2002, pp. 205-211.
- B. K. Vollmann, Gesta Berengarii und Waltharius-Epos, Deutsches Archiv für Erforschung des Mittelalters, 61, 2005, pp. 161–164.
