= Gisela of Friuli =

Countess of Ivrea (c. 876 – c. 913)

Gisela

Countess of Ivrea
- Born: c. 876
- Died: after 23 January 913
- Spouses: Adalbert I of Ivrea
- Issue: Berengar II of Italy; Bertha, abbess of Modena
- Father: Berengar I of Italy
- Mother: Bertila of Spoleto
- Religion: Catholic Church

Gisela of Friuli (also Gisla) (c. 876 – after 23 January 913) was a medieval Italian noblewoman. She was the daughter of Berengar I of Italy and Bertila of Spoleto. Through her marriage to Adalbert I of Ivrea, Gisela was countess of Ivrea, and mother of Berengar II of Italy.

== Life ==
Little is known about Gisela's life. Her father was Berengar I of Italy, who was Margrave of Friuli and who became King of Italy during Gisela's childhood. Gisela's mother was probably Bertila, Berengar's first wife, whom he married in 875. Gisela is thus presumed to have been born after 876. Gisela's sister, Bertha, later became abbess of Santa Giulia in Brescia. Gisela married Adalbert I of Ivrea sometime between 898 and 905, and probably by 902/3. This was a political alliance which was intended to reconcile Adalbert and Gisela's father, Berengar I of Italy. Gisela and Adalbert's son, Berengar II of Italy, must have been born by 903, as by 918 he was fifteen years old, and was named count and imperial missus. When Gisela died is not known: she was still alive in January 913, when her father, Berengar, issued a diploma referring to her husband Adalbert as his son-in-law (gener noster), but by 915 Adalbert had married Ermengarde of Tuscany, suggesting that Gisela had died.

== Issue ==
With Adalbert, Gisela had at least two children:

- Berengar II of Italy
- Bertha, abbess of Modena

== Sources ==
- A. Bedina, 'Gisla,' In: Dizionario Biografico degli Italiani, Vol. LXI (Rome, 2001).
- Liutprand of Cremona, Antapodosis, in J. Becker, ed., Die Werke Liutprands, MGH SS rer Germ 41 (Hannover, 1915).
- P. Squatriti, trans., The Complete Works of Liutprand of Cremona (Washington, DC, 2007).
- L. Schiaparelli, I diplomi di Berengario I (Rome, 1903).
- B. Rosenwein, 'The family politics of Berengar I, King of Italy (888-924),' Speculum LXXI (1996),
- E. Hlawitschka, Franken, Alemannen, Bayern and Burgunder in Oberitalien (774-962) (Freiburg i.Br. 1960).
- P. Buc, 'Italian Hussies and German Matrons. Liutprand of Cremona on Dynastic Legitimacy,' Frühmittelalterliche Studien 29 (1995), 207–225.
