= Walfred of Friuli =

Walfred (or Waltfred) (died 896) was the Count of Verona and then Margrave of Friuli in the last decades of the ninth century.

Walfred was an early supporter of Berengar of Friuli in his bid for the Iron Crown of Lombardy following Charles the Fat's deposition in 887. He was described as his "highest counsellor." He was a consiliarius and marchio by appointment of Charles and he was the greatest magnate in eastern Lombardy after Berengar. He even succeeded Berengar in Friuli, but under what circumstances scholarly opinion is divided.

He may have succeeded Berengar, by Berengar's appointment around 890, when he is last heard of in Friuli. The Annales Fuldenses under the year 896, tell how Walfred died in office and how he had held Verona with "great fidelity to the emperor," meaning Arnulf of Carinthia, specifying that his death was the circumstance for Berengar to reassert his claim to kingship after his falling out with Arnulf earlier that year. It has been suggested that Walfred was placed in Berengar's office by Arnulf in 896 after Berengar's defection from Arnulf's camp early in that year. Walfred held Friuli less than a year in that case.
