= William Bernard McCabe =

Irish journalist and historian (1801–1891)

William Bernard McCabe (23 November 1801 – 8 December 1891) was an Irish poet and author of historical romances.

Born in Dublin, he worked as a journalist for local newspapers before moving to London in 1833. He was employed by The Morning Chronicle and The Morning Herald to provide coverage of parliamentary debates and to review new books.

In 1852 he returned to Dublin and edited the "Dublin Telegraph" for the next five years.

He also carried out translation work, including the Funeral Oration on Daniel O’Connell by R F Ventura and Ireland and the Irish During the Repeal Year, 1843 by Jacob Venedey.

After retiring, he settled in Brittany.

== Publications ==
His works include;

- A Catholic History of England (1847–54)
- Bertha (1851)
- Florine, Princess of Burgundy (1855)
- Adelaide, Queen of Italy (1856).
- Agnes Arnold (1860)
- The last days of O’Connell
