= Suppo II =

Suppo II (835 – 885) was a member of the Supponid family. Engelberga, the wife of Louis II may have been his sister. He was Count of Parma, Asti, and Turin. Along with his cousin, Suppo III, he was the chief lay magnate in Italy during Louis's reign.

His father was Adelchis I of Spoleto and his mother is unknown. He himself had four sons: Adelchis II of Spoleto, Arding, Boso, and Wifred. He also left a daughter, Bertila, who married Berengar I of Italy.

== Sources ==
- Wickham, Chris. Early Medieval Italy: Central Power and Local Society 400-1000. MacMillan Press: 1981.
