= Lothair II of Italy =

King of Italy from 947 to 950

Lothair II

King of Italy
- Reign: 947–950
- Predecessor: Hugh
- Successor: Berengar II
- Born: 926/8
- Died: 22 November 950
- Spouse: Adelaide of Italy (m. 947)
- Issue: Emma, Queen of West Francia
- Dynasty: Bosonids
- Father: Hugh of Provence
- Mother: Alda (or Hilda)
- Signum manus

Lothair II (926/8 – 22 November 950), often Lothair of Arles, was the King of Italy from 947 to his death. He was of the noble Frankish lineage of the Bosonids, descended from Boso the Elder. His father and predecessor was Hugh of Provence, grandson of Lothair II, King of Lotharingia, and his mother was a German princess named Alda (or Hilda).

Although he held the title of rex Italiae, he never succeeded in exercising power there. In 931, Lothair's father, Hugh, made him co-regent. He was married, 12 December 947, to the fifteen-year-old Adelaide, the spirited and intelligent daughter of Rudolph II of Burgundy and Bertha of Swabia.

Their marriage was part of a political settlement designed to conclude a peace between her father and his. In 933, Hugh of Arles had given up his kingdom (Provence) to his inveterate enemy Rudolph II, who merged the two kingdoms into a new Kingdom of Burgundy, but died in 937. The couple had a daughter, Emma, born as early as 948, who was married in 966 to the Carolingian Lothair of France.

Lothair's power in Italy was nominal. From the time of the successful uprising of the nobles in 945, when Hugh was forced into exile, Berengar of Ivrea kept all real power and patronage in his hands. In 950, Lothair died at Turin, perhaps poisoned by Berengar, who attempted to cement his usurped political power in Lombardy by forcing Lothair's widow to marry his son Adalbert. Instead she entreated the protection of Otto I of Germany, whom she married.

Lothair figures briefly in the part related to Adelaide in the Gesta Ottonis, an epic poem about Otto I of Germany, an epic poem about written ca. 960 by Hroswitha of Gandersheim.

== Bibliography ==
- Bouchard, Constance B. (1988). "The Bosonids or Rising to Power in the Late Carolingian Age". French Historical Studies. 15, No. 3 (Spring): 407–431. doi:10.2307/286367. JSTOR 286367.
- Duckett, Eleanor Shipley (1988). Death and Life in the Tenth Century. University of Michigan Press.
- Flodoard of Reims (2004). Bachrach, Bernard S.; Fanning, Steven (eds.). The Annals of Flodoard of Reims, 919-966. University of Toronto Press.
- Previte-Orton, C.W. (1922). "Italy in the Tenth Century". In Gwatkin, H.M.; Whitney, J.P.; Tanner, J.R.; Previte-Orton, C.W. (eds.). The Cambridge Medieval History. Vol. III: Germany and the Western empire. The Macmillan Company. pp. 148–178.
- Pierre Riché. Les Carolingiens, une famille qui fit l'Europe. Paris: 1983. ISBN 2-01-009737-8 (in French)
- Jean-Charles Volkmann. Bien Connaître les généalogies des rois de France. ISBN 2-87747-208-6 (in French)
- "Lothar II." Encyclopædia Britannica. Retrieved April 25, 2007, from Encyclopædia Britannica Online: http://www.search.eb.com/eb/article-9049021.
- "Lothar koenig von Italien" Genealogical references (in German).

Regnal titles
Preceded by Hugh	King of Italy; 947–950	Succeeded by Berengar II
