= Franz Staab =

Franz Staab (21 November 1942 in Budenheim - 26 April 2004 in Stadecken-Elsheim) was a German historian.

== Life ==
Franz Staab was born on 21 November 1942 in Budenheim. He married Jane Darby, née Anderson, with whom he had one son and one daughter.

Staab completed his studies and doctorate at the University of Mainz, where he worked as a research assistant and university assistant from 1971 to 1985. His dissertation (with Alfons Becker) was published in 1972 under the title Untersuchungen zur Gesellschaft am Mittelrhein in der Karolingerzeit (tr. "Investigations into the Society on the Middle Rhine in the Carolingian period"). His written habilitation of 1984, Das Erzstift Mainz im 10. und 11. Jahrhundert (tr. "The Mainz Archdiocele in 10th and 11th and 11th Century") was published in 2008 by the Vereinigung der Heimatfreunde am Mittelrhein. After a professorship in Mainz from 1985 to 1987 he became a professor at the University of Education in Landau (since 1990 University of Koblenz-Landau).

Staab was President of the Pfälzischen Gesellschaft zur Förderung der Wissenschaften ("Palatinate Society for the Advancement of Sciences") from 1998 and vice-chairman of the Historischer Verein der Pfalz ("Historical Association of the Palatinate") from 1997. From 2001 until his death, he also served as President of the Gesellschaft für mittelrheinische Kirchengeschichte ("Society for Middle Rhine Church History"); he is also listed as an author in the Neue Deutsche Biographie.

His special interest as a medievalist was the early and high medieval history of the present-day federal state of Rhineland-Palatinate. In meticulous essays, he often succeeded in expanding limited source material through discoveries in early modern manuscripts. Staab's last work was a biography of Hildegard von Bingen.

As a wine historian Franz Staab introduced experimental historical research on wine, reviewing the production of wines as documented in ancient writings and suggesting means of reproducing ancient types of wine.

Staab was buried in Hauptfriedhof Mainz, Mainz's main cemetery. From the estate of Franz Staab, the Mainz City Library acquired approximately 1500 books.

== Writings ==
- Untersuchungen zur Gesellschaft am Mittelrhein in der Karolingerzeit ("Studies on the Society on the Middle Rhine in the Carolingian period") (Geschichtliche Landeskunde "History of Regional Studies"). Volume 11. Franz Steiner, Wiesbaden 1975, ISBN 3-515-01910-3.
- Das Erzstift Mainz im 10. und 11. Jahrhundert ("The Archbishopric of Mainz in the 10th and 11th centuries"). Vereinigung der Heimatfreunde am Mittelrhein ("Association of Local History Enthusiasts of the Middle Rhine"), Bingen 2008.
- Hildegard von Bingen. Fragmente einer Biographie der Heiligen ("Hildegard von Bingen. Fragments of a biography of the saints"). From the estate of Franz Staab. The "canonisation" of Hildegard of Bingen by Georg May. With annexes by Teresa Tromberend and Werner Lauter. Vereinigung der Heimatfreunde am Mittelrhein ("Association of Local History Enthusiasts of the Middle Rhine"), Bingen 2012.
- 7 works by Staab are listed in the deutsche digitale bibliothek
- philpapers.org lists 38 works attributed to Staab

== Literature ==
- Pirmin Spiess: In memoriam Franz Staab. Archiv für mittelrheinische Kirchengeschichte ("Archive for Middle Rhine Church History") 56 (2004), p. 551–553.
