= San Sisto, Piacenza =

Church in Piacenza, Italy

Coordinates: 45°03′26″N 9°41′35″E

San Sisto is a Renaissance style, Roman Catholic church, located on the Via of the same name in north-central Piacenza, Region of Emilia Romagna, Italy.

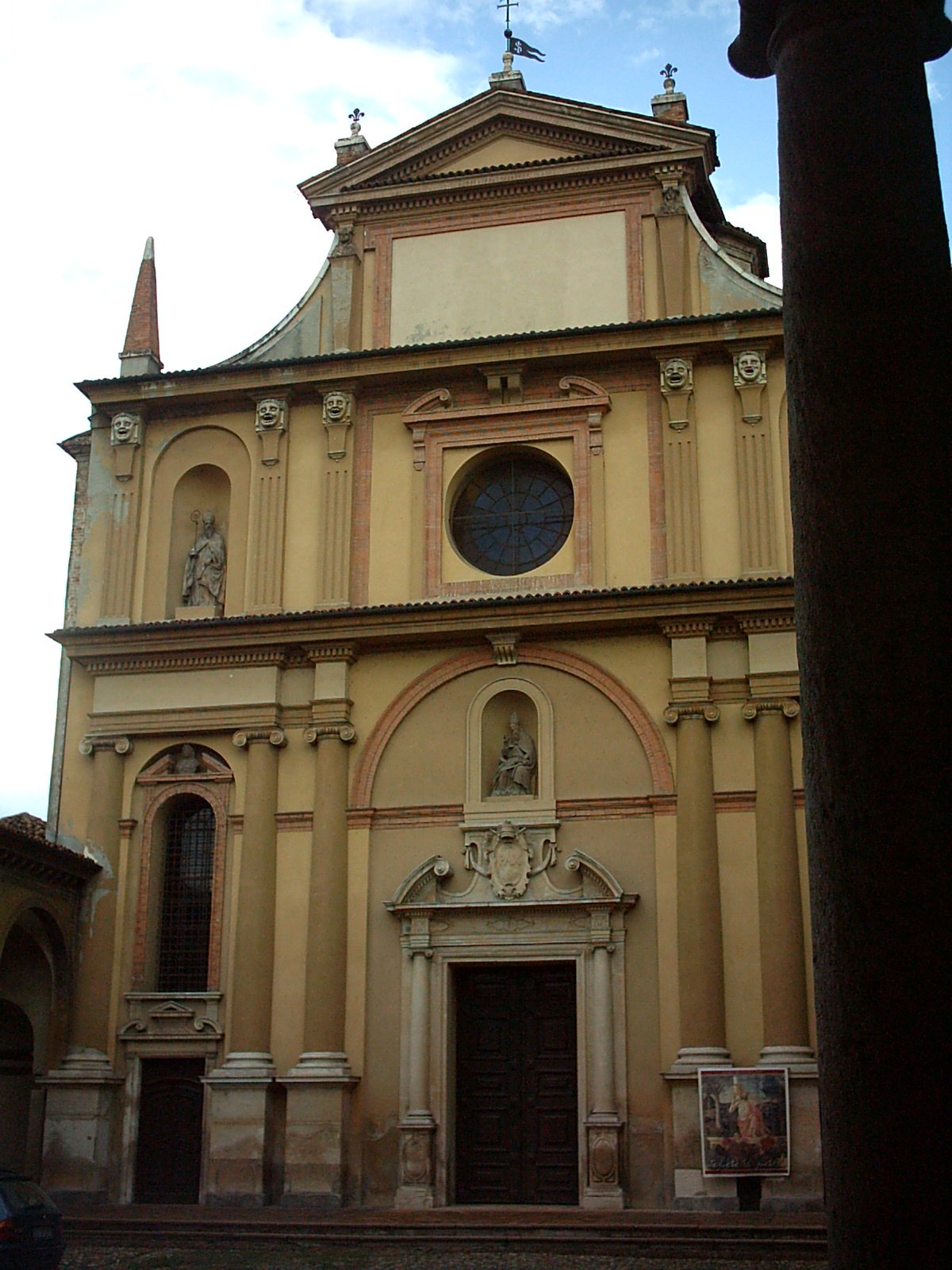
Mannerist facade

== History ==
The church and an adjacent convent and hospital were founded in 874 by Queen Angilberga, wife of the Emperor Louis II. She had been exiled some years after his death, but in 882, she was allowed to return to Italy, where she became abbess of the Benedictine convent, presumably this one.

The convent became wealthy due to grants of significant privileges and properties in northern Italy. Over the centuries, several orders of monks and nuns competed for control of the convent until 1425, when it was assigned to the Benedictine order of Monte Cassino. In 1499, the convent commissioned the present church building from Alessio Tramello. It was consecrated in 1511.

== Facade ==
The Mannerist facade was not competed until 1591. Asymmetries and odd touches abound. Side doors are smaller than the central one. The entry portal has a broken tympanum holding a central statuary niche within a rounded arch with a central bracket. The ground floor of the facade has half-columns, while the second floor has shorter pilasters topped by smiling gorgon masks that drain rainwater through their mouths. The central rose window is framed in a square, again with a broken tympanum and two central brackets. The facade has three life-sized statues of San Germano, San Sisto, and St. Benedict. San Sisto is the church's namesake, while San Germano and St. Benedict are both associated with Cassino, the location of the first Benedictine monastery. The busts of two female saints, Barbara and Martina, also appear on the façade, above each of the side windows.

The adjacent Renaissance-style convent (1591–1596) is owned by the military and closed to visitors. The cloister has a number of medallions frescoed by Bernardino Zacchetti.

== Interior ==
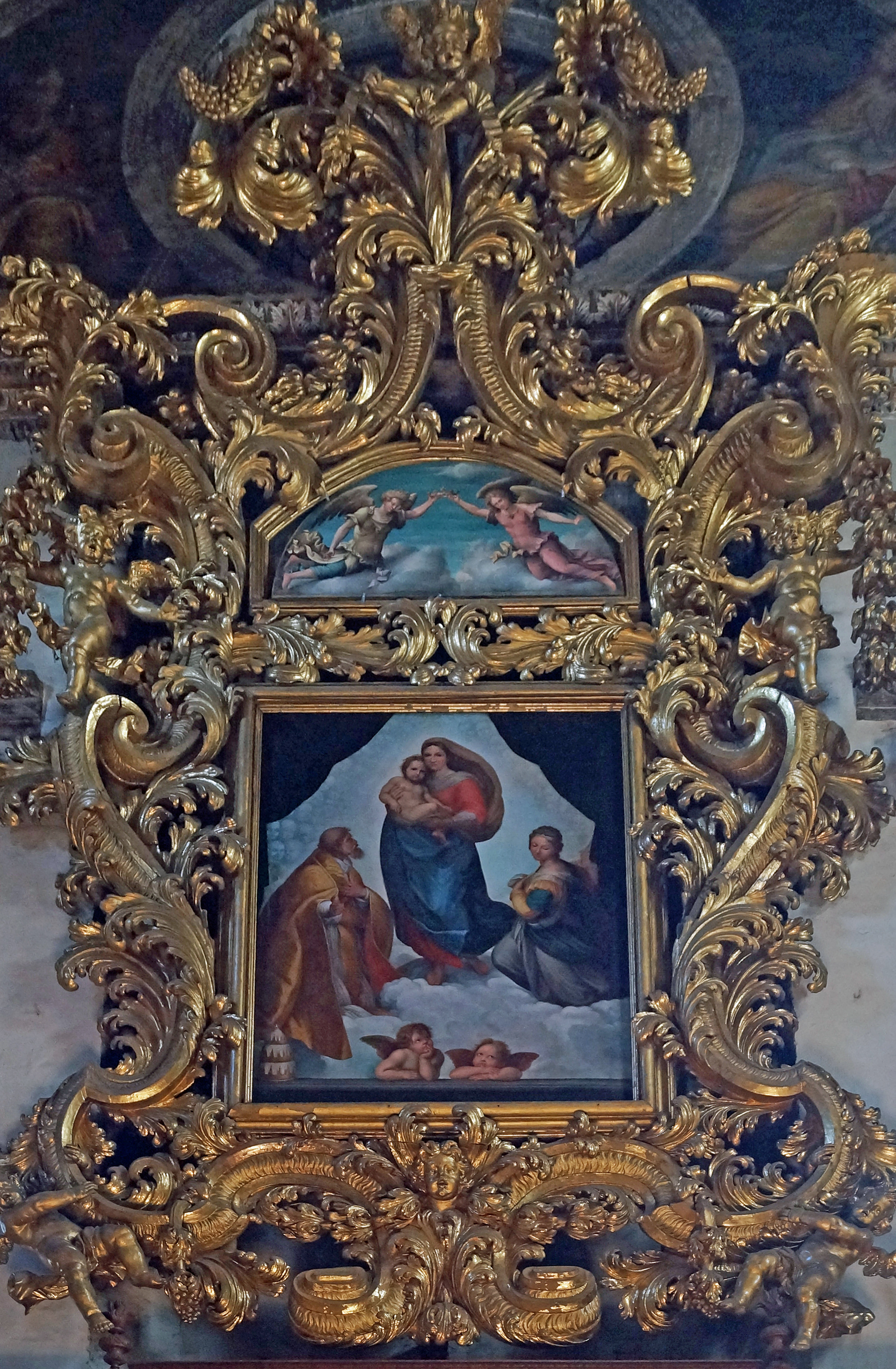
Sistine Madonna attributed to Pietro Antonio Avanzini

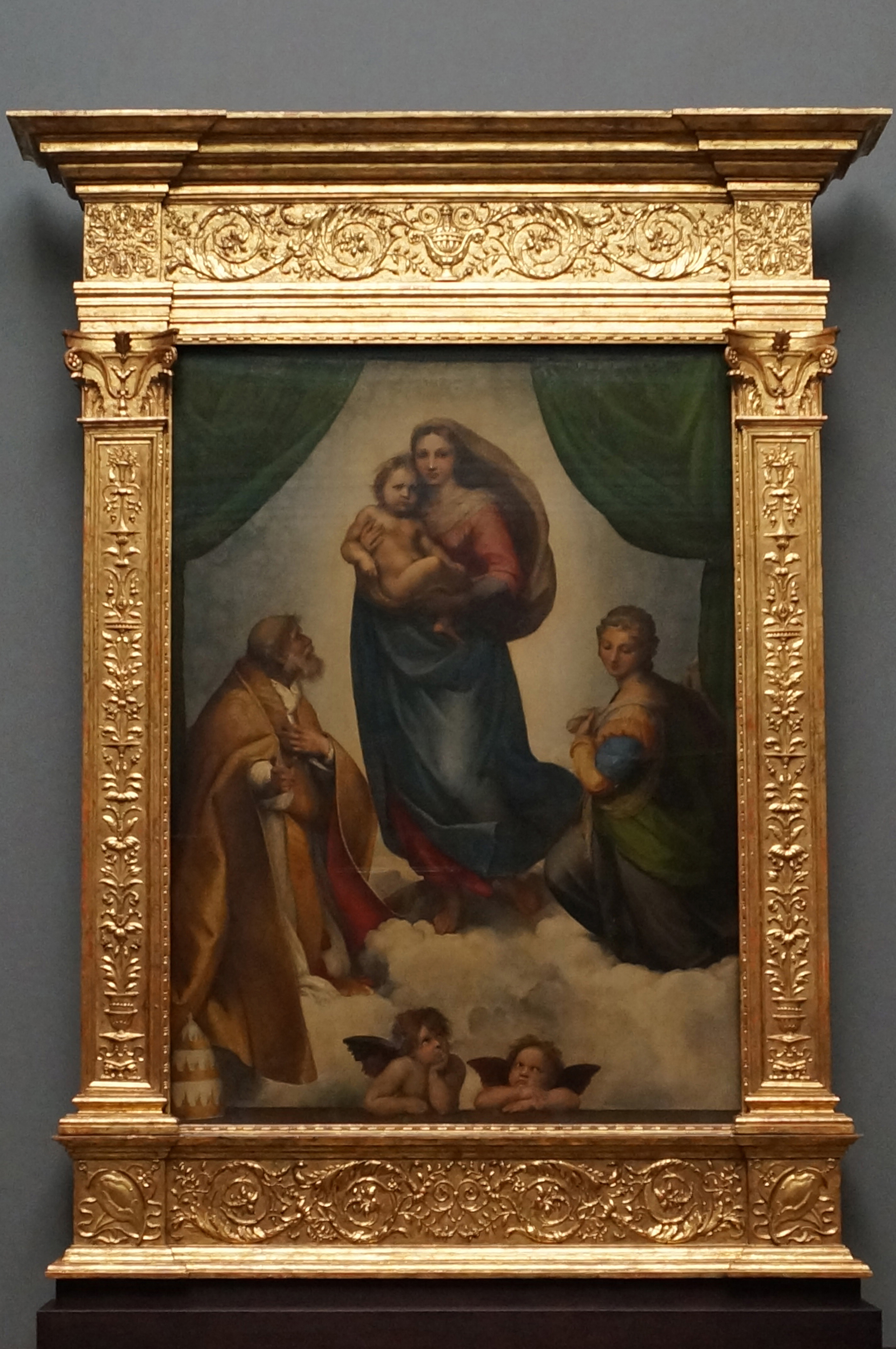
Sistine Madonna by Raphael

The interior has chapels frescoed by Antonio and Vincenzo Campi, there is an altarpiece in the choir of massacre of the innocents by Camillo Procaccini and another painting by Jacopo Palma il Giovane in the choir. The cupola at the center of the transept was frescoed by Bernardino Zacchetti.

At the end of the Nave, in the choir of the apse is a copy of the Raphael's Sistine Madonna attributed to Pietro Antonio Avanzini. To the great loss of Piacenza, the Benedictines pawned off the original in 1754 to Augustus III, King of Poland for the lordly sum of twelve thousand zecchini. The painting is now one of the masterpieces on display at the Gemäldegalerie in Dresden;

To the left of the transept is the altar and tomb dedicated to Margaret of Parma, designed by Simone Moschino. On the facing side is the monumental chapel of St Barbara (1926), patron saint of artillery men. The nave ceiling is painted with a pattern of a cassettoni or geometric squares on a barrel ceiling.

== See also ==
- 16th-century Western domes
