= Supponids =

The Supponids were a Frankish noble family of prominence in the Carolingian regnum Italicum in the ninth century. They were descended from Suppo I, who appeared for the first time in 817 as a strong ally of the Emperor Louis the Pious. He and his descendants were on and off dukes of Spoleto, commonly in opposition to the Guideschi clan, another Frankish family powerful in central Italy.

== History ==
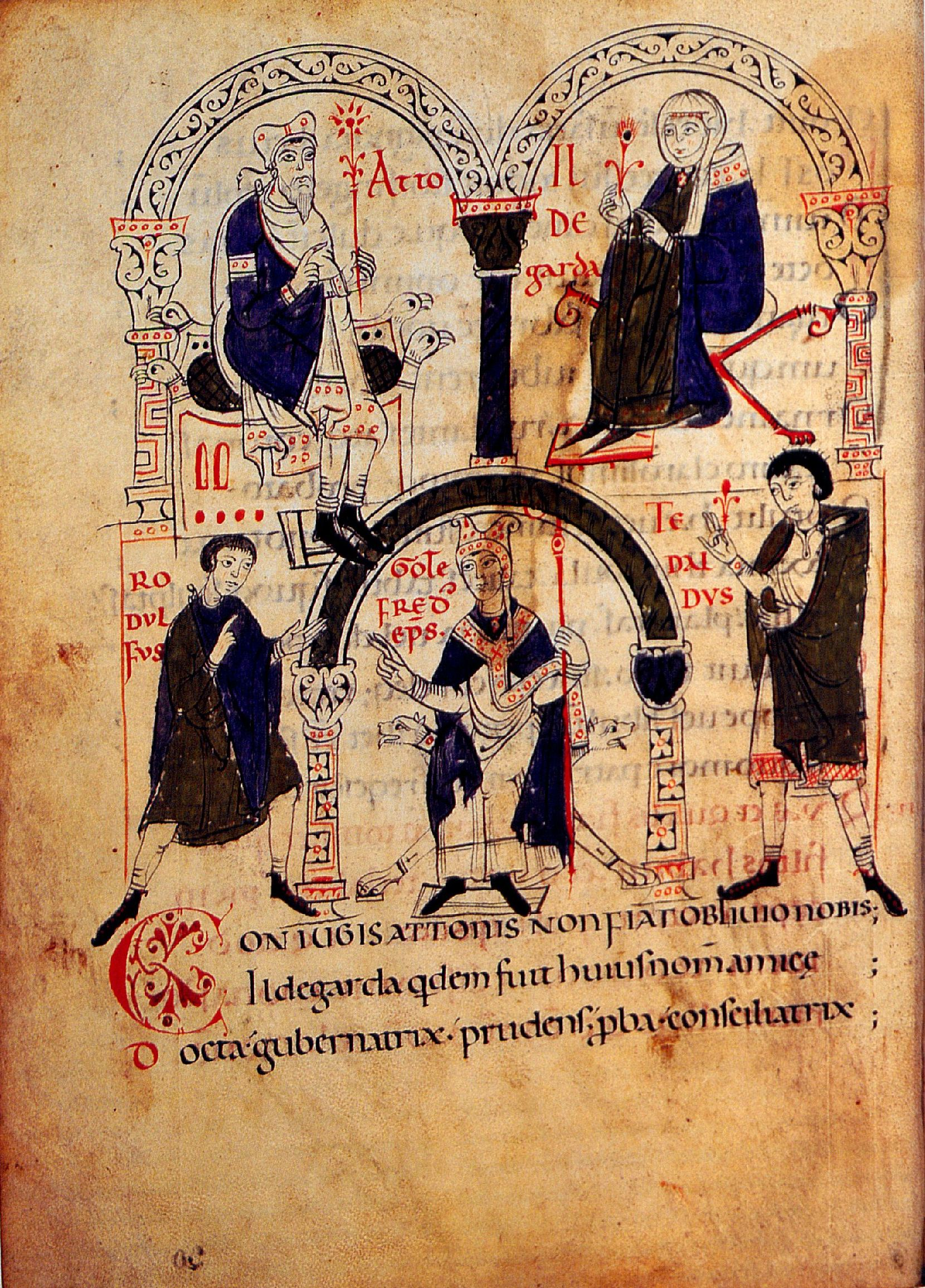
Hildegard (a Supponid daughter) and her husband Adalbert-Atto of Canossa, are depicted in a Medieval manuscript under noble arches and above their three sons Rudolph, Geoffrey (Gotofred), and Tedald (the grandfather of Matilda of Tuscany)

The family consolidated its holdings in northern Italy through the 820s, 830s, and 840s, often controlling the counties of Brescia (hereditarily), Parma, Cremona, and Piacenza among others. Their power was extended and not highly centralised. They shared power with the bishops in the cities and were stoutly loyal to the emperors in order to ensure the peace and stability necessary to rule their vast and separated domains in the Po Valley. This loyalty bought them great power, especially in their heartland of Emilia.

A Supponid daughter, Engelberga, married the Emperor Louis II. With her influence, the Supponids became the most powerful noble family in Italy during the two decades of Louis's reign and one of the few to hold high offices. Following Louis's death, the Supponids supported their relatives, the dukes of Friuli, and the German claimants for the Italian crown against the Guideschi dukes of Spoleto and the West Franks. Their influence declined rapidly after they fell out with Berengar I in 913 and joined the faction of Rudolph II of Burgundy in 922.

During the tenth century another Supponid daughter, Hildegard, married Adalbert-Atto of Canossa and they were the paternal great-grandparents of Matilda of Tuscany, who became one of the most important governing figures of the Italian Middle Ages.

The Supponid family is not documented often after the middle of the tenth century.

== Prominent members ==
- Suppo I (d. 824)
- Adelchis I (d. c. 834), second son of Suppo I
- Suppo II, son of Adelchis I
  - Boso, Count of Parma
  - Wifred I, Count of Piacenza
- Suppo III (d. 877/879), cousin of Suppo II
- Suppo IV
- Mauring
- Engelberga (d. 896/901), wife of Louis II, Holy Roman Emperor

== Sources ==
- Wickham, Chris. Early Medieval Italy: Central Power and Local Society 400-1000. MacMillan Press: 1981.
