= Berengar II of Italy =

King of Italy from 950 to 961

Berengar II
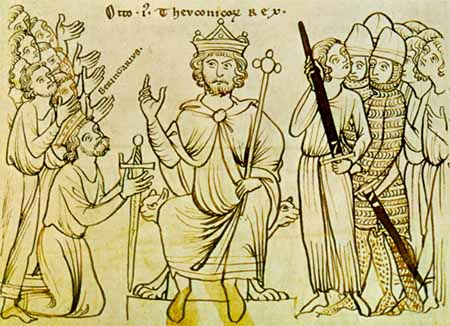
- Berengar bows to King Otto, Manuscriptum Mediolanense, c. 1200

King of Italy
- Reign: 950–961
- Predecessor: Lothair II
- Successor: Otto I
- Born: c. 900
- Died: 4 August 966; Bamberg Castle, March of the Nordgau, Kingdom of Germany
- Spouse: Willa of Tuscany
- Issue: Adalbert, King of Italy; Guy, Margrave of Ivrea; Conrad, Margrave of Ivrea; Rozala, Queen of the Franks
- House: Anscarids
- Father: Adalbert I of Ivrea
- Mother: Gisela of Friuli

Berengar II (c. 900 – 4 August 966) was the king of Italy from 950 until his deposition in 961. He was a scion of the Anscarid and Unruoching dynasties, and was named after his maternal grandfather, Berengar I. He succeeded his father as margrave of Ivrea around 923 (whence he is often known as Berengar of Ivrea), and after 940 led the aristocratic opposition to kings Hugh and Lothair II. In 950 he succeeded the latter and had his son, Adalbert, crowned as his co-ruler. In 952 he recognised the suzerainty of Otto I of Germany, but he later joined a revolt against him. In 960 he invaded the Papal States, and the next year his kingdom was conquered by Otto. Berengar remained at large until his surrender in 964. He died imprisoned in Germany two years later.

== Ruling Ivrea (923–50) ==
Berengar was a son of Margrave Adalbert I of Ivrea and his wife Gisela of Friuli, daughter of the Unruoching king Berengar I of Italy. He succeeded his father as margrave about 923 and married Willa, daughter of the Bosonid margrave Boso of Tuscany and niece of King Hugh of Italy. The chronicler Liutprand of Cremona, raised at Berengar's court at Pavia, gives several particularly vivid accounts of her character.

About 940 Berengar led a revolt of Italian nobles against the rule of his uncle. To evade an assault by Hugh's liensmen, he, forewarned by the king's young son Lothair, had to flee to the court of King Otto I of Germany. Otto avoided taking sides; nevertheless, in 945 Berengar was able to return to Italy with hired troops, welcomed by the local nobility. Hugh was defeated and retired to Arles, and he was nominally succeeded by Lothair. From the time of Berengar's successful uprising, all real power and patronage in the Kingdom of Italy was concentrated in his hands, with Hugh's son Lothair as titular king. Lothair's brief reign ended upon his early death in 950, presumably poisoned.

== Ruling Italy (950–61) ==
Berengar then assumed the royal title with his son Adalbert as co-ruler and were crowned in Pavia, in the Basilica of San Michele Maggiore. He attempted to legitimize his kingship by forcing Lothair's widow Adelaide, the respective daughter, daughter-in-law, and widow of the last three Italian kings, into marriage with Adalbert. However, the young woman fiercely refused, whereafter Berengar had her imprisoned at Garda Castle, allegedly mistreated by Berengar's wife Willa. With the help of Count Adalbert Atto of Canossa she managed to flee and entreated the protection of King Otto of Germany. Otto, himself a widower since 946, took the occasion to gain the Iron Crown of Lombardy: Adelaide's requests for intervention resulted in his 951 invasion of Italy. Berengar had to entrench himself at San Marino, while Otto received the homage of the Italian nobility, married Adelaide himself, and assumed the title of a King of the Lombards. He afterwards returned to Germany, appointing his son-in-law Conrad Italian regent at Pavia.

Berengar by Conrad's agency appeared at the 952 Reichstag in Augsburg and paid homage to Otto. He and his son Adalbert remained Italian kings as Otto's vassals, though they had to cede the territory of the former March of Friuli to him, which the German king enfeoffed to his younger brother Duke Henry I of Bavaria as the Imperial March of Verona. When Otto had to deal with the revolt of his son, Duke Liudolf of Swabia in 953, Berengar attacked the Veronese march and also laid siege to Count Adalbert Atto's Canossa Castle.

== Losing control and death (961–66) ==
In 960, Berengar invaded the Papal States under Pope John XII, on whose appeal finally King Otto, aiming at his coronation as Holy Roman Emperor, again marched against Italy. Berengar's troops deserted him and Otto by Christmas 961 had taken Pavia by default and declared Berengar deposed. He proceeded to Rome, where he was crowned emperor on 2 February 962. He then once more turned against Berengar, who was besieged at San Leo.

Meanwhile, Pope John had entered into negotiations with Berengar's son Adalbert, which in 963 caused Otto to move into Rome, where he deposed the pope and had Pope Leo VIII elected. The next year, Berengar finally surrendered to Otto's forces; he was imprisoned at Bamberg in Germany, where he died in August 966. His wife Willa spent the rest of her life in a German nunnery.

== Notes ==
Preceded by Lothar II	King of Italy; 950–961 with Adalbert	Succeeded by Otto I
Preceded by Adalbert I	Margrave of Ivrea; 923–966	Succeeded by Adalbert II
