= Engelberga =

Carolingian empress from 851 to 875

- Abbess of San Salvatore, Brescia

Empress consort of the Carolingian Empire
- Tenure: 5 October 851 – 12 August 875
- Born: c. 830
- Died: between 896 and 901
- Burial: St. Emmeram's Abbey, Regensburg
- Spouse: Louis II of Italy
- Issue: Ermengard of Italy
- House: Supponids
- Father: Adelchis I of Spoleto

Engelberga (or Angilberga, died between 896 and 901) was the wife of Emperor Louis II and thus Carolingian empress to his death on 12 August 875. As empress, she exerted a powerful influence over her husband.

== Youth ==
Engelberga was probably the daughter of Adelchis I of Spoleto and a member of one of the most powerful families in the Kingdom of Italy at that time, the Supponids.

Born around 830, Engelberga probably spent her youth in Pavia. She married Louis II in 860, after being his concubine for roughly ten years, but did not play a role in political life until after the death of his father, Lothair I, in 855. Upon his death, Lothair's kingdom was divided between his three sons and, as the eldest, Louis received Italy and the title of emperor.

== Empress ==
Engelberga had far more political influence than was usual of a consort, partially due to Louis' love for her. Engelberga's active participation in politics was unusual, when queens were typically consigned to the domestic sphere.

In 856, the imperial couple were hosted in Venice by Doge Pietro Tradonico and his son Giovanni Tradonico. A few years later, Engelberga began to exert her influence in a conflict between Pope Nicholas I and Archbishop John of Ravenna. Seen as insubordinate by the Pope, John was thrice summoned to appear before a papal tribunal. Instead, he took refuge in the imperial court at Pavia, where Engelberga attempted to intervene with Rome on his behalf. Though ultimately unsuccessful, the incident was the beginning of Engelberga's efforts to assert her influence as empress.

In 862, Louis's brother Lothair II sought to annul his marriage to Teutberga, as she had failed to bear him any children. The local bishops had blessed the annulment and Lothair's subsequent remarriage, but in November 863, Pope Nicolas summoned the bishops to Rome and excommunicated them for their violation of ecclesiastical law. The bishops fled to Louis's court and pleaded their case, resulting in the Emperor laying siege to the Holy See in January 864. Engelberga sent a communication to Nicholas, guaranteeing his safety if he were to come to court to negotiate with her husband. Their meeting resulted in an agreement whereby the bishops were allowed to return and the siege was ended.

In subsequent years Engelberga was granted additional titles by her husband, due in large part to her diplomatic role. In 868, she became abbess of San Salvatore, Brescia, a convent with a history of royal abbesses. Engelberga's control of San Salvatore is indicative of her power, as this monastery was typically owned by royal women and served as a power base for the royal family. Engelberga maintained control of San Salvatore following Louis' death in 875, which was unusual, because this meant the monastery was no longer controlled by a direct relative of the monarch. Engelberga also founded her own monastery, San Sisto, Piacenza in 874.

In January 872, the aristocracy tried to have her removed, as she had not borne the emperor any sons, only having two daughters. The nobility attempted to replace Engelberga with the daughter of a local aristocrat, Winigisus. Louis ordered Engelberga to remain in the northern regions of his land during this period, but Engelberga disobeyed and joined Louis in the south, ending any potential rift between the couple. Instead, Louis opened negotiations with Louis the German, king of East Francia, to make him his heir. In order to sideline Engelberga, the nobility elected Charles the Bald, king of West Francia, on Louis's death in 875.

== Widowhood ==
Boso V of Arles, a faithful of Charles, kidnapped Engelberga and her only surviving daughter, Ermengard. He forced the latter to marry him in June 876, at the same time he was made Charles' governor in Italy with the title of dux.

With Engelberga's backing, Boso declared himself King of Provence on 15 October 879. Subsequently, Engelberga was banished to Swabia. After Charles the Fat's forces took Vienne in 882, Engelberga was allowed to return to Italy. In 896, Engelberga became abbess of her own foundation of San Sisto, Piacenza, but died shortly afterward.

== Notes ==
Preceded by Ermengarde of Tours	Carolingian empress 855–875	Succeeded by Richilde of Metz
Preceded by Ermengarde of Tours	Queen consort of Italy; 851–875	Succeeded by Richilde of Metz
