= Adelchis I of Spoleto =

Italian nobleman (died c. 861)

Adelchis I or Adelgis I (died c. 861) was the Count of Parma by the 830s, of Cremona after 841, and eventually of Brescia. According to some sources, he succeeded to the Duchy of Spoleto in 824. He was a second son of Suppo I and father of Suppo II. His main area of interest was in the Aemilia and eastern Lombardy. His wife was Bertha, the daughter of Count Wifred I of Piacenza.

Regnal titles
Preceded by Mauring	Duke of Spoleto; 824–834	Succeeded by Lambert
