= Battle of Wels =

10th-century battle between Hungary and Austria

- Part of the Hungarian invasions of Europe
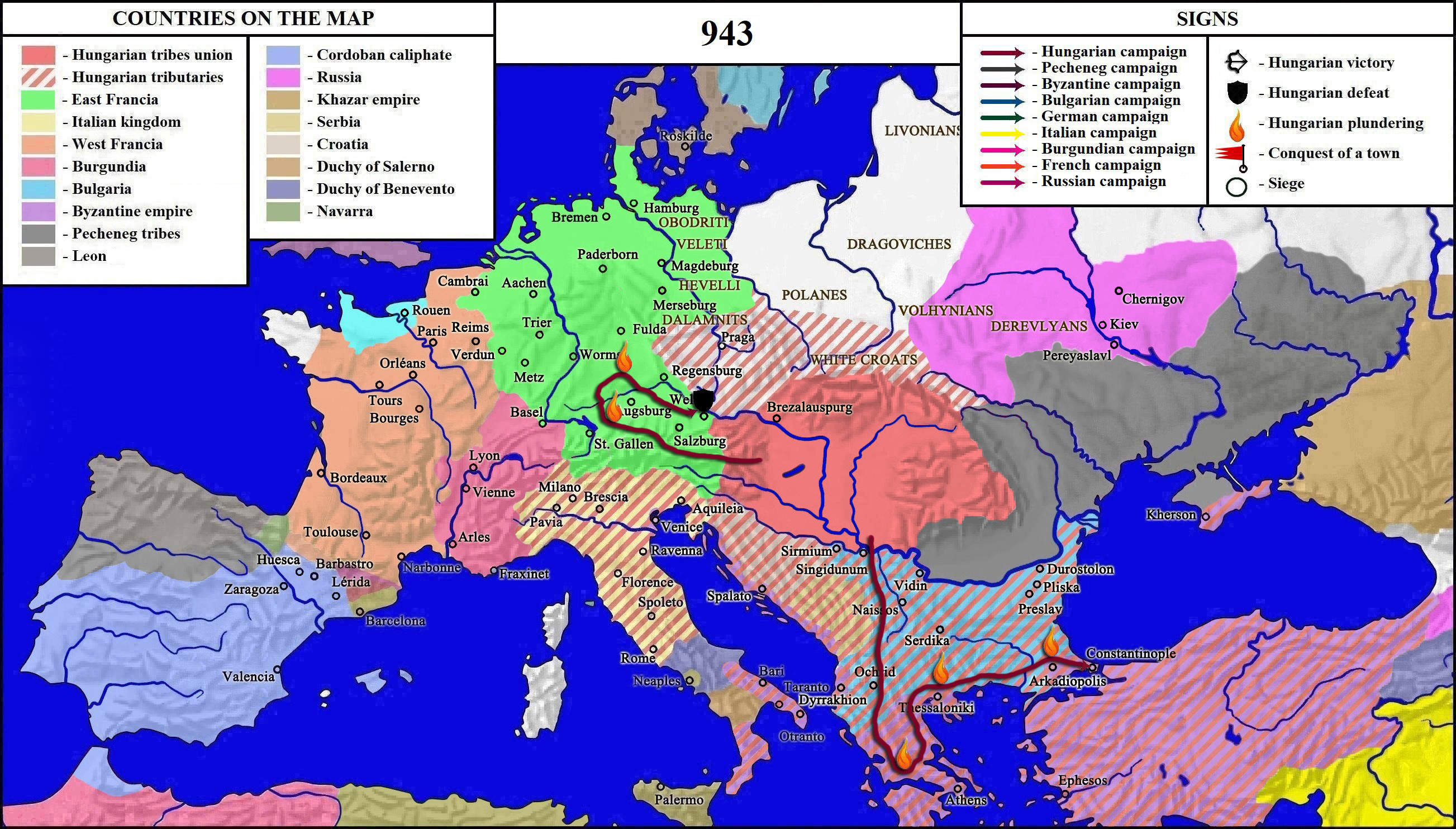
- The Hungarian campaign in Europe in 943. Battle of Wels marked.
Date	10/12 August 943
Location	Wels, today Austria
Result	Bavarian–Carantanian victory

Belligerents
East Francia: Duchy of Bavaria; March of Carinthia	Principality of Hungary

Commanders and leaders
Berthold, Duke of Bavaria	Unknown

Strength
Unknown	Unknown

Casualties and losses
Unknown	Heavy

The Battle of Wels (10/12 August 943) was fought between a joint Bavarian–Carantanian army and a Hungarian force near Wels in the Traungau, on the plain of the Welser Heide, nowadays a part of Austria.

== Background ==
The battle took place at the height of the Hungarian invasions of Europe. The Bavarians and Carantanians were victorious under the command of the Bavarian leader Berthold. The victory is mentioned widely in contemporary histories, in Widukind of Corvey's Deeds of the Saxons, in Hermann of Reichenau's Chronicon and by Adalbert of Weissenburg in his continuation of the Chronicon of Regino of Prüm. It is also mentioned in the Annals of Saint Gall, the Annals of Salzburg and the Annals of Magdeburg, and in the necrology of Freising Cathedral.

The cause of the battle may have originated with the Bavarians, since under the previous duke, Eberhard, they had been on good relations with the Hungarians and poor relations with the king of Germany. Berthold, who was the brother of Eberhard's father, Duke Arnulf, is said by Widukind to have been "administering" Bavaria on behalf of King Otto I after Eberhard's banishment in 938. The change in government in Bavaria may have precipitated the war. As recently as 937, Arnulf had allowed the Hungarians to pass peacefully through Bavaria to raid parts further west. Under Arnulf, Berthold had been duke of a region south of the Alps and attached to Bavaria, the old region of Carantania, the future Duchy of Carinthia. After 938, the Bavarians and Carantanians were thus united under a single ruler, a factor Adalbert may have seen as critical to their success in 943.

== Battle ==
While the sources do not provide details on the battle itself, the historian Charles Bowlus has suggested that the Hungarians may have been surprised by the Bavarians and Carantanians while returning from pasturing their horses on the steppe-like grasslands of the Welser Heide. There was a crossing of the Enns river at Ennsburg. At the time, Welser Heide lay on the Bavarian side of the border with Hungary, which was the Enns. Wels lies on the Traun, and the site of the battle may have been a no-man's-land between the Enns and the Traun. It was essentially a border action and not deep within Bavaria, which the Hungarians had penetrated many times before. Herwig Wolfram, on the other hand, believes that they were defeated at the outset of a new expedition before they had gotten much further than their own frontier.

According to Widukind, Berthold was "renowned for this celebrated triumph". Adalbert, who identifies the place of the battle as Wels but places it in the year 944, states that the Hungarians were defeated "as they had never been defeated by our men before". The Annals of Salzburg add that "only a few Hungarians escaped", while those of Saint Gall that "their entire army was wiped out". These comments suggest that the victory of 943 was superior to that of King Henry I at the Battle of Riade (933) ten years earlier, although it would be superseded by Otto's victory at the Lechfeld in 955.
