= Cunigunde of Swabia =

Queen of the Franks from 913 to 918

Cunigunde

Queen consort of the Franks German queen
- Tenure: 913–918

Margravine of Bavaria
- Tenure: –907
- Born: c. 878
- Died: 7 February after 918
- Burial: Lorsch Abbey
- Spouse: Luitpold, Margrave of Bavaria; Conrad I of Germany
- Issue: Arnulf, Duke of Bavaria; Berthold, Duke of Bavaria
- House: Ahalolfings
- Father: Berchthold I (Erchanger), Count Palatine of Swabia
- Mother: Gisela

Cunigunde of Swabia (c. 878 – 7 February after 918), a member of the Ahalolfing noble family, was Margravine of Bavaria until 907 by her first marriage with Margrave Luitpold and German queen (Queen of the Franks) from 913 to 918 by her second marriage with King Conrad I, the first and sole ruler of the Conradine dynasty.

== Life ==
Cunigunde was the daughter of the Swabian count palatine Berchthold I. Her mother possibly was Gisela, a daughter of the Carolingian king Louis the German and his consort Emma of Altdorf. Cunigunde's brother Erchanger became Duke of Swabia in 915.

Very little is known of her. She married first the Bavarian margrave Luitpold who became the ancestor of the Luitpolding dynasty. Her sons by him were Arnulf the Bad and Berthold, both ruling as Dukes of Bavaria later on. Luitpold was killed in the 907 Battle of Pressburg fighting against the Hungarian forces.

According to the Annales Alamannici, in 913 Cunigunde married King Conrad I of Germany who was striving to strengthen the ties with the Bavarian stem duchy.The marriage left no male heirs; two children are assumed, both born 913: Herman, who died young, and Cunigunda, who married Werner of Worms and was possibly the mother of Conrad the Red, the founder of the Salian dynasty. First mentioned as queen consort in June 914, Cunigunde apparently did not play a significant political role while her son Arnulf remained in constant conflict with the king. In 915 she chose Lorsch Abbey as her burial place.

King Conrad died in December 918 after a long illness, possibly by a heavy injury during a campaign against Arnulf of Bavaria. He was succeeded by the Saxon duke Henry the Fowler.

== Sources ==
- MacLean, Simon (2017). Ottonian Queenship. Oxford University Press. p. 26. ISBN 978-0-19-880010-1.

Cunigunde of Swabia Ahalolfings Born: c. 878 Died: 7 February after 918
Preceded by Ota	Margravine of Bavaria –907	Succeeded by Judith of Friuli
Preceded by Ota	German Queen (Queen of East Francia); 913–918	Succeeded by Matilda of Ringelheim
