= Luitpold, Margrave of Bavaria =

10th-century German nobleman

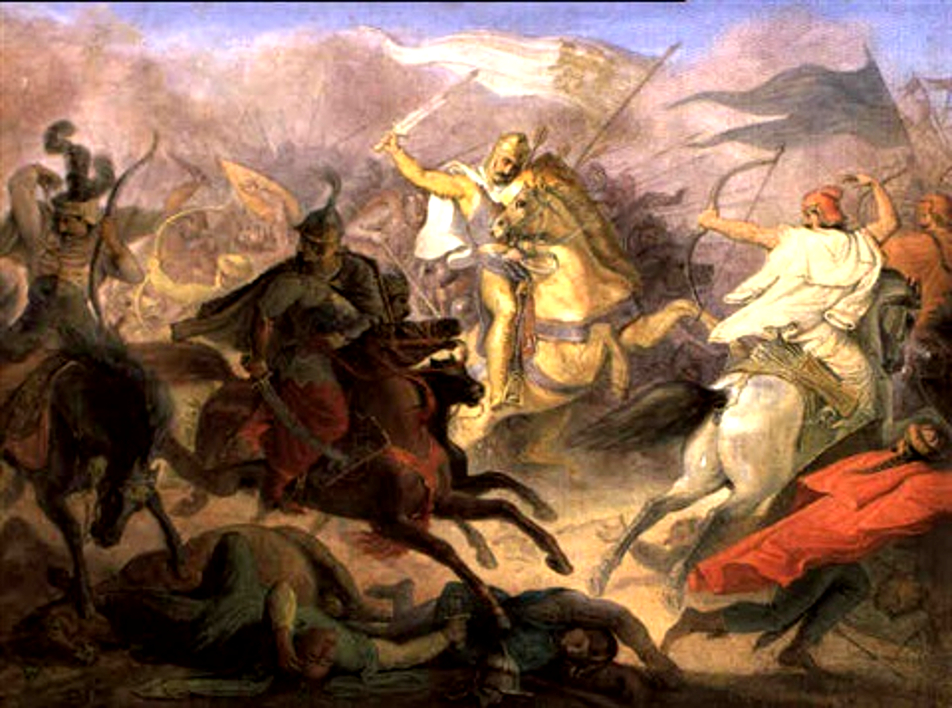
Death of Luitpold in the Battle of Pressburg (Wilhelm Lindenschmit the Elder)

Luitpold (or Liutpold) (modern Leopold) (died 4 July 907), perhaps of the Huosi family or related to the Carolingian dynasty by Liutswind, mother of Emperor Arnulf of Carinthia, was the ancestor of the Luitpolding dynasty which ruled Bavaria and Carinthia until the mid-tenth century.

== Biography ==
In 893, he was appointed margrave in the March of Carinthia and Upper Pannonia by Arnulf of Carinthia, then King of East Francia. Luitpold succeeded the deposed Margrave Engelschalk II of the Wilhelminer family; unlike his predecessors he could extend his power unimpeded by the mighty Margrave Aribo, acquiring numerous counties in Carinthia as well as on the Danube and in the Nordgau around Regensburg from 895 on, and setting himself up as the most prominent of Bavaria's aristocracy. Though he thereby laid the foundations of the renewed stem duchy, it was his son Arnulf the Bad who, based on his father's acquisitions, first assumed the title of a Bavarian duke.

As Luitpold remained a loyal supporter of the Carolingian monarch Arnulf of Carinthia and his son Louis the Child, he enjoyed their support and was entrusted with the defence at the Hungarian and Moravian borders. In 898 he fought successfully against Mojmír II, the king of Great Moravia, on behalf of the king's rebellious brother Svatopluk II and forced Mojmír to become a vassal of Arnulf. In 903, Luitpold held the title of a dux Boemanorum, "Duke in Bohemia". He organised the Frankish defence against the Magyars under Grand Prince Árpád after invading Hungary, on 4 July 907 was killed east of Vienna in the Battle of Pressburg.

== Marriage and issue ==
Luitpold married Cunigunde of Swabia, daughter of Berthold I, royal Count palatine in Swabia, and sister of Duke Erchanger of Swabia, a member of the Ahalolfing dynasty. After Luitpold's death Cunigunda married King Conrad I of Germany in 913. Luitpold had two sons by her:

- Arnulf the Bad, Duke of Bavaria from 907 to 937
- Berthold, Duke of Bavaria from 938 to 948.

From his descendants' titles, Luitpold is often called a duke of Bavaria or margrave of Bavaria, the latter title being more accurate to his actual status.

== Sources ==
Muller-Mertens, Eckhard (1999). "The Ottonians as kings and emperors". In Reuter, Timothy; McKitterick, Rosamond (eds.). The New Cambridge Medieval History: Volume 3, C.900-c.1024. Cambridge University Press.239

Luitpold, Margrave of Bavaria Luitpolding Died: 907
Preceded by Engeldeo	Margrave of Bavaria; 889–907	Succeeded by Arnulf the Bad
