= Henry III of Bavaria =

Henry the Younger
- Duke of Bavaria
- Fresco of Henry III among the guests at the wedding of Otto II and Theophanu, c. 972 (Abbazia di San Michele Arcangelo, Schifanoia)
- Born: c. 940
- Died: 5 October 989
- Buried: Niederaltaich Abbey
- Noble family: Luitpoldings
- Spouse: Hildegard (?)
- Father: Berthold, Duke of Bavaria
- Mother: Wiltrud of Bergen

Henry III (c. 940 – 5 October 989), called the Younger, a member of the Luitpolding dynasty, was the first Duke of Carinthia from 976 to 978, Duke of Bavaria from 983 to 985 and again Duke of Carinthia from 985 to 989.

== Life ==
Henry the Younger was the only surviving son of Duke Berthold of Bavaria, who at the time of his birth was a loyal supporter of the royal Ottonian dynasty descending from Saxony. In 921 Henry's uncle Arnulf the Bad after two years of struggle had finally acknowledged the rule of Henry the Fowler as King of Germany and in turn achieved a certain autonomy for his Duchy of Bavaria. However, this exceptional status was denied by King Henry's son and successor Otto I, who in 938 had Arnulf's son and successor Duke Eberhard deposed and banned. King Otto appointed Arnulf's younger brother Berthold duke instead, after he had pledged allegiance and renounced the Bavarian privileges.

Duke Berthold remained a loyal vassal of the king, however, his son Henry the Younger was still a minor upon his father's death in 947 and King Otto I took the occasion to cede the Bavarian duchy to his own younger brother Henry I. As Henry I about 937 had married Judith, Duchess of Bavaria, a daughter of the late duke Arnulf the Bad, he could raise claims to the ducal title.

=== Early years ===
After he became of age, Henry the Younger waited patiently, though it seemed that Bavaria was ultimately lost for the Luitpoldings, when upon the death of the Ottonian duke Henry I in 955 he was succeeded by his four-year-old son Henry the Wrangler (as Henry II) under the tutelage of his mother Judith. Coming of age, Duke Henry II of Bavaria increased his power: in 954 his sister Hadwig had married Duke Burchard III of Swabia, in 972 he himself married Gisela of Burgundy, the niece of Emperor Otto's wife Adelaide of Italy. The tables began to turn upon Otto's death on 7 May 973, followed by the death of Henry's brother-in-law Duke Burchard III of Swabia on 12 November: Duke Henry II, not satisfied with Bavaria, raised claims to Burchard's Duchy of Swabia upon, trading on the difficulties of the new emperor, his cousin Otto II, to establish his rule. His demands were denied, when Emperor Otto II enfeoffed his nephew Otto, son of late Duke Liudolf, with Swabia.

The next year Duke Henry II of Bavaria openly revolted against his Ottonian cousin Emperor Otto II, backed by Bavarian and Saxon nobles, and even obtained the support of Duke Boleslaus II of Bohemia and Mieszko I of Poland. Emperor Otto II had to struggle for his rule, finally in 976 he marched against the Bavarian capital Regensburg and declared Duke Henry II deposed.

=== Duke of Carinthia ===
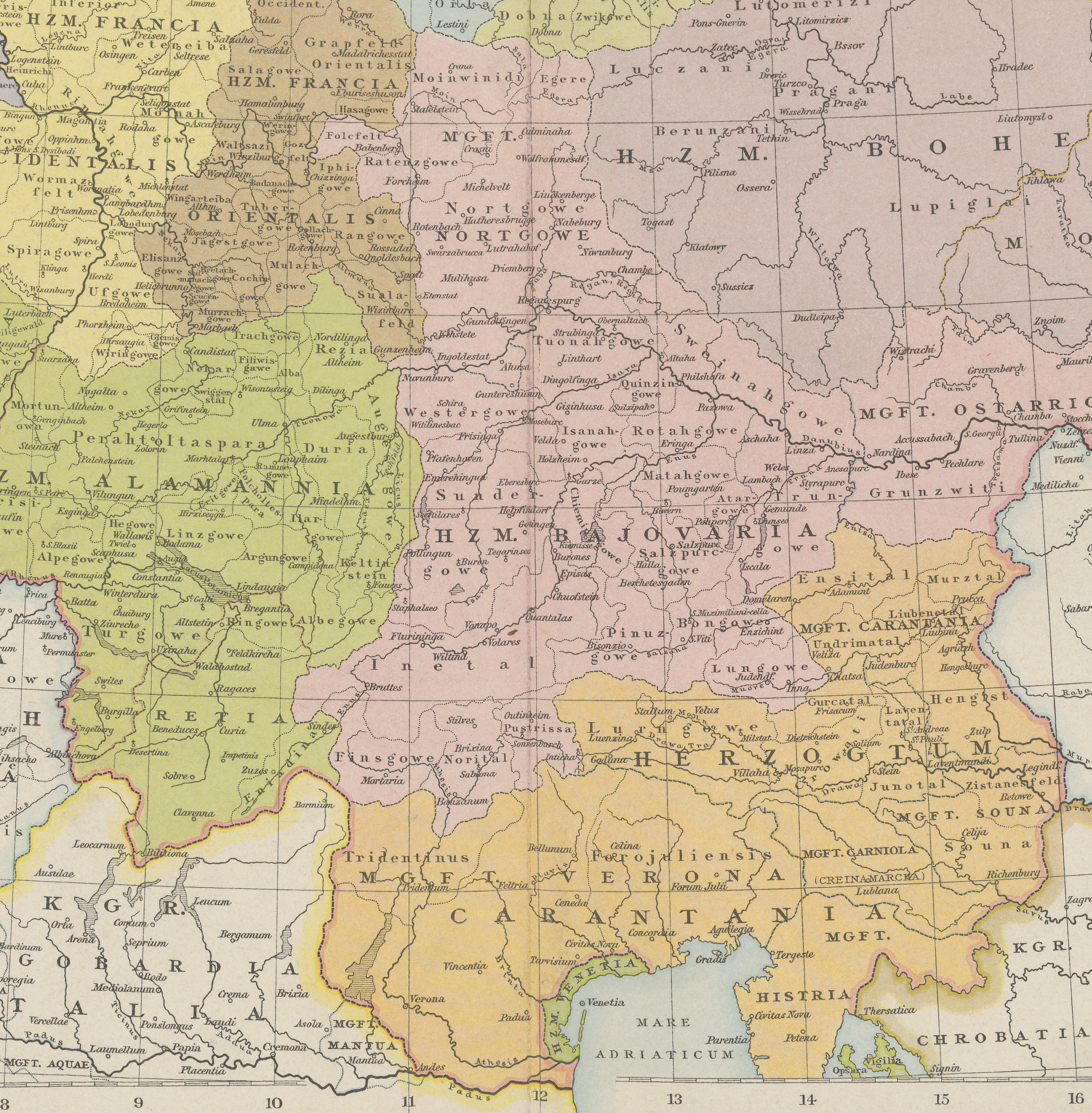
Duchy of Carinthia with Veronese march (orange), about 1000

Now the patient Luitpolding heir Henry the Younger finally gained some compensation, when the emperor took the occasion to rearrange the southeastern German territories. He severed the lands of the former March of Carinthia from Bavaria and Henry the Younger was enfeoffed with the newly established Duchy of Carinthia (as Henry I), including the rule over the marches of Styria, Carniola and Istria, as well as the Italian March of Verona (his father Berthold had already received the title of a Carinthian duke by King Henry I of Germany in 927). The scaled-down Bavarian duchy passed to the loyal Ottonian duke Otto I of Swabia, while Count Leopold of Babenberg was vested with the remaining Bavarian Margraviate of Austria.

In 978 however, Henry the Younger himself was banned, probably because he now had joined the rebellion against Emperor Otto II in the War of the Three Henries, instigated by his predecessor the deposed duke Henry the Wrangler and Bishop Henry I of Augsburg during the emperor's campaign against Bohemia. Together with the forces of Duke Boleslaus II they occupied the Bavarian town of Passau, but were defeated by Otto's troops. At the Easter Imperial Diet of Magdeburg, the emperor deposed Henry the Younger and enfeoffed his Salian nephew Otto of Worms with the Carinthian duchy. All Southern German duchies — Swabia, Bavaria and Carinthia — then were held by the emperor's relatives.

=== Later years and death ===
Enfeebled by his defeat against the Sicilian Kalbids at the 982 Battle of Stilo, Emperor Otto II upon the death of Duke Otto I of Swabia and Bavaria recalled Henry the Younger from banishment in 983 and instated him as Bavarian duke (as Henry III) at the Imperial Diet of Verona. Nevertheless, his rule still remained contested by Henry the Wrangler and after the emperor died in the same year, Dowager Empress Theophanu on behalf of the succession of her minor son Otto III finally reconciled with him in 985. Duke Henry III had to renounce Bavaria in favour of Henry the Wrangler and again was given the Duchy of Carinthia instead, which Otto of Worms was forced to cede to him.

When Henry the Younger died without issue in 989, the male line of the Luitpoldings became extinct. He was succeeded in Carinthia and Verona by Henry the Wrangler, who thereby once again united the Bavarian and Carinthian estates under his rule. Henry the Younger was buried at Niederaltaich Abbey.

Henry III of Bavaria Luitpoldings Born: c. 940 Died: 5 October 989
Regnal titles
New title	Duke of Carinthia; Margrave of Verona; 976–978	Succeeded by Otto I
Preceded by Otto I	Duke of Bavaria; 983–985	Succeeded by Henry II
Preceded by Otto I	Duke of Carinthia; Margrave of Verona; 985–989	Succeeded by Henry II
