= Bohemian March =

The Bohemian March may refer to either:

- the March of Moravia, a marcher state existing in various forms from 1182 to 1918
- the March of the Nordgau, a margraviate in the north of the duchy of Bavaria in the High Middle Ages
