= Luitpoldings =

Early medieval dynasty in Bavaria, Germany

- Ruling dynasty of Bavaria in the ninth century
- Country: East Francia, Kingdom of Germany
- Founded: 9th century, by Luitpold
- Titles: Margrave of Carinthia; Duke of Carinthia; Margrave of Upper Pannonia; Count/Margrave of the Nordgau; Duke of Bavaria; Count palatine of Bavaria
- Dissolution: 989, by death of Henry III, the Younger
- Cadet branches: Houses of Dießen; Andechs; Schweinfurt (?); Younger Babenberg (?); Wittelsbach (?)

The Luitpoldings were an East Frankish dynasty that ruled the German stem duchy of Bavaria in the ninth century. They are named after their descent from Margrave Luitpold (or Liutpold) of Bavaria, who reasserted Bavarian autonomy in the early 10th century. His son Arnulf the Bad first assumed the title of Duke of Bavaria.

The Luitpoldings would remain dukes until 947, when the king ceded the Bavarian duchy to his own brother Henry I instead. The Luitpoldings disappear from history after the 10th century, but several houses that are thought to descend from them (such as the Wittelsbach and the Babenberger) would continue to thrive.

== History ==
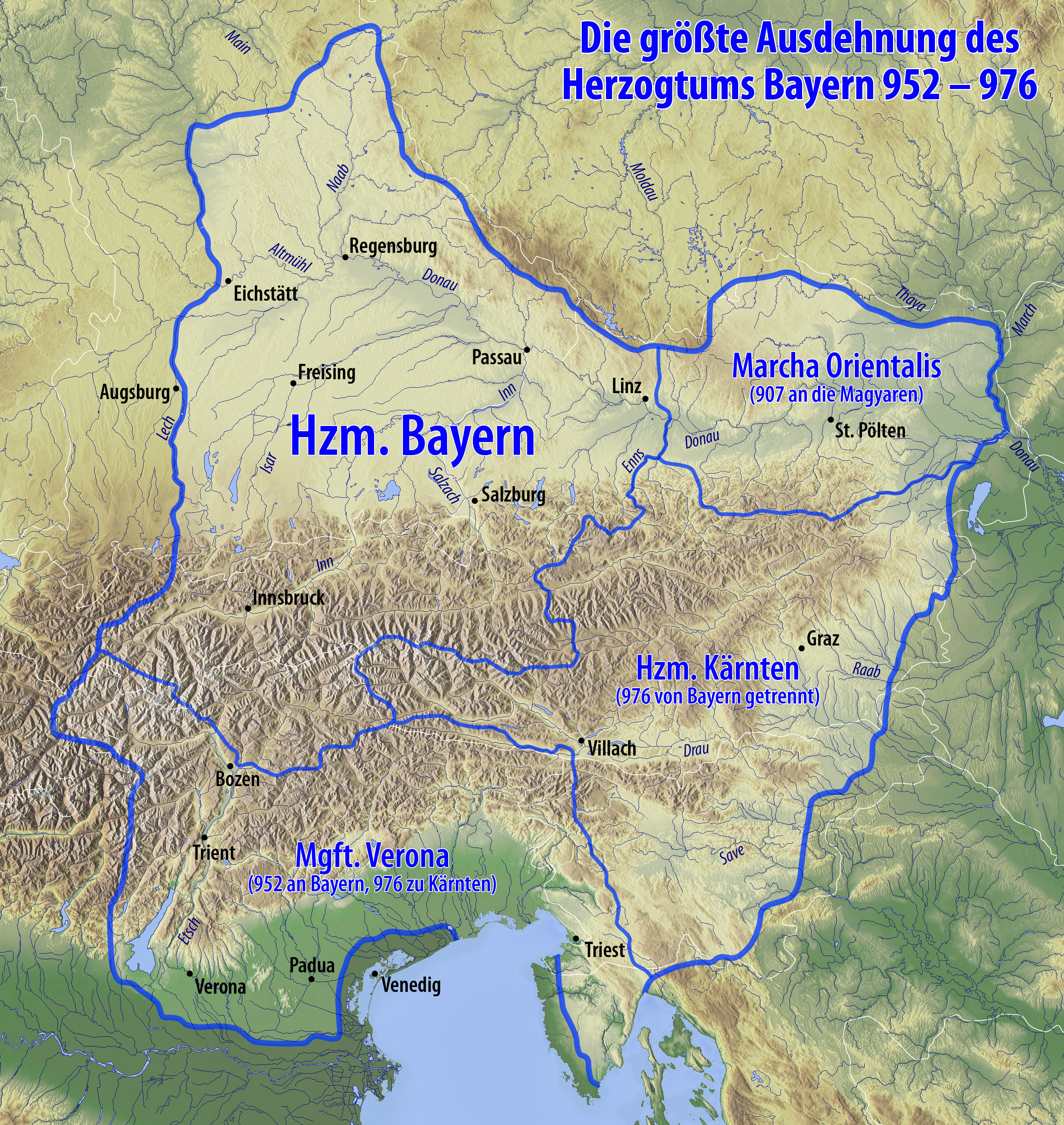
Duchy of Bavaria (952–976)

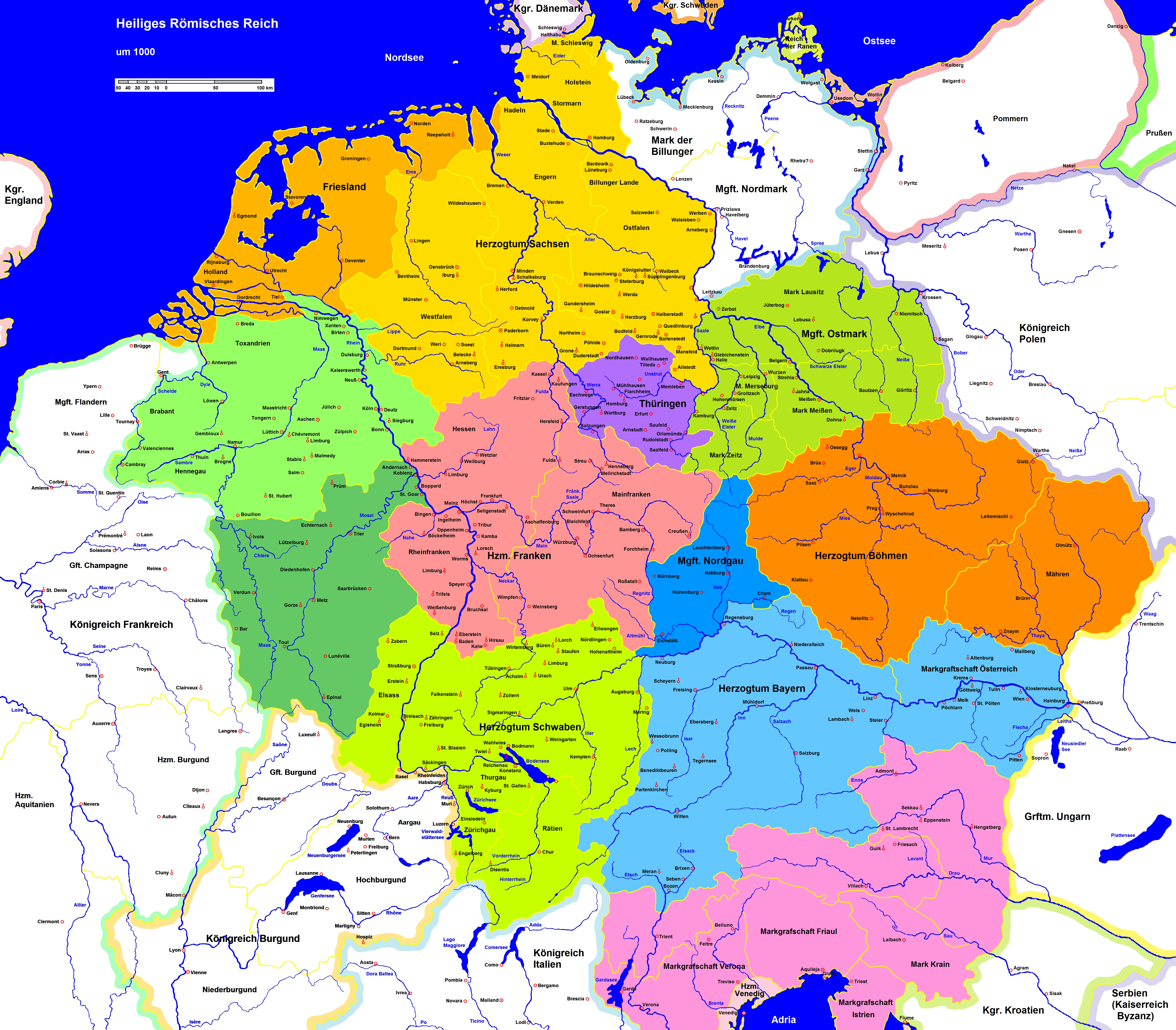
The Holy Roman Empire around 1000

=== Historical context ===
After the last Agilolfing duke of Bavaria, Tassilo III, was deposed in 788, Charlemagne and his successors placed Bavaria under the rule of non-hereditary governors and civil servants. By the late 9th century however, Frankish direct power had waned in the region. The conquests of the Hungarians and their recurring invasions had allowed Bavaria's local rulers to grab greater independence.

Margrave Luitpold, the progenitor of the Luitpoldings, set himself up as the most prominent of Bavaria's aristocracy and thereby laid the foundations of the renewed stem duchy.

=== Origins ===
==== Ernstides and Huosi ====
Luitpold's descent has not been conclusively established. Luitpold and his ancestors are said to have been an offshoot of the early medieval Bavarian Huosi, one of the five leading Bavarian dynasties during the time of the formation of the Bavarian tribes, who flourished in the 8th and 9th century.

His father may have been Ernst II, of the Ernstides dynasty [de]. In this case, his aunt would have been married to Gebhard of the Lahngau, the progenitor of the Conradines. A namesake, Luitpold, who died in 846, could have been a relative.

Emperor Arnulf of Carinthia calls him a blood relative and a cousin. This relation may have gone through Luitpold's father Ernst II, whose possible sister Liutswind was married to the Carolingian King Carloman of Bavaria, and were the parents of Arnulf. If correct, this would explain the transmission of the dukedom of the Bavarian/Bohemian march from Ernst I to Luitpold, both of whom are also recorded as Counts in the Nordgau.

==== Babenberger ====
According to early tradition (as well as later Babenberger chroniclers), Luitpold descended from the Popponids or Elder House of Babenberg, who in turn descending from the Frankish Robertians. At the same time, the Younger Babenberger, through their progenitor Leopold I, Margrave of Austria, are often assumed in older literature to descend from Luitpold (most likely due to the similarity of their names). Thus Luitpold would be the link between the Elder and Younger Babenberger.

But in fact, Luitpold was probably linked with the enemies of the Elder Babenberger, the Conradines, through his aunt and seemed to have played an active role by heading a Conradine army during the early phases of the clashes around the Babenberg Feud [de] that led to their near-extinction.

One possible link could have been created after the fall of the Babenberger, through Luitpold's unnamed sister. Apart from fathering Luitpold and his direct heir, Ernst III, Ernst II also had a daughter. This daughter married Henry III of Babenberg, a surviving son after the Feud, binding the two dynasties together and adding further legitimacy to Luitpold's power.

==== Welf ====
Luitpold's mother is not known, but she is speculated to have been a Welf daughter of Conrad I the Elder.

=== Dukes of Bavaria ===
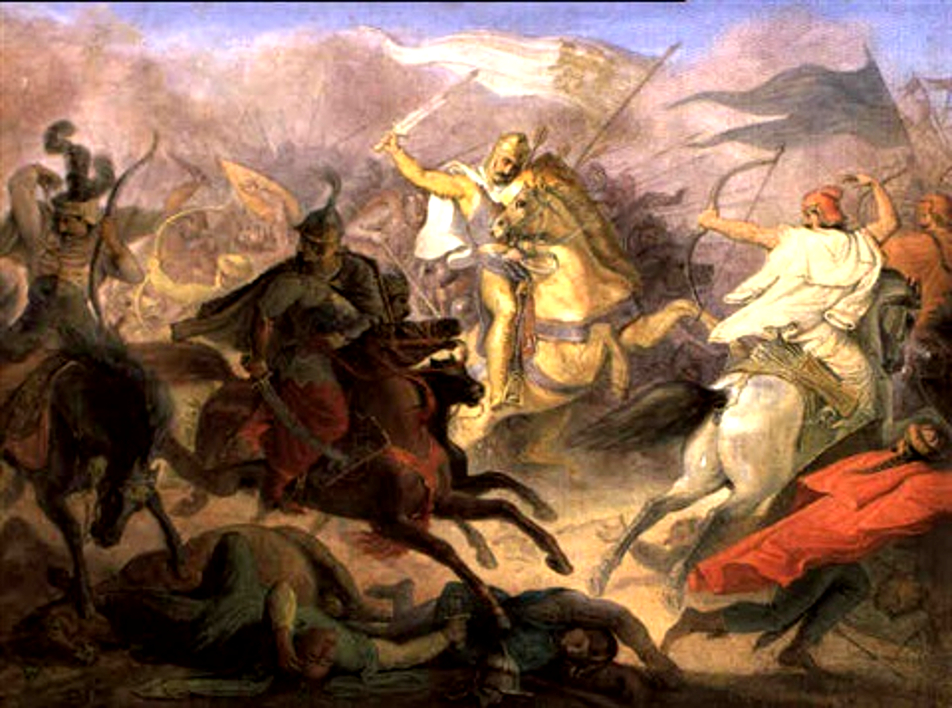
The death of Luitpold in the Battle of Pressburg, by Wilhelm Lindenschmit the Elder

In 893, Emperor Arnulf appointed Luitpold Margrave of Carinthia and Upper Pannonia to succeed to the Wilhelminer margrave Engelschalk II. Luitpold was able to enlarge his Bavarian possessions around Regensburg and in the adjacent March of the Nordgau. He became a military leader during the Hungarian invasions and was killed in the 907 Battle of Pressburg.

While the Kingdom of Germany emerged under the rule of King Conrad I and his successors of the Ottonian dynasty, Luitpold's son and heir Arnulf the Bad was backed by the local nobility and adopted the Bavarian ducal title. He reorganized the duchy's defenses against the Hungarian invaders and, according to the contemporary Annales iuvavenses, built up a king-like position at his Regensburg residence. He interfered with the Ottonian King Henry I of Germany, whose rule he finally acknowledged in 921, but he reserved numerous privileges for himself. Given a free hand, he campaigned in the lands of the Přemyslid duke Wenceslaus of Bohemia and even invaded the Kingdom of Italy in 933–934 in order to obtain the Iron Crown of Lombardy for his son Eberhard, though without success.

=== Decline ===
Eberhard succeeded his father as Duke of Bavaria in 937. However, he soon struggled with King Otto I of Germany, who had no intention to respect the Bavarian autonomy. King Otto declared Eberhard deposed and banned him the next year.

Instead of Eberhard, King Otto appointed Arnulf's brother Berthold duke, after the latter had renounced the exercise of the Bavarian liberties. Berthold would remain a loyal supporter of King Otto.

Nevertheless, upon Berthold's death in 947, the hereditary title was denied to his son Henry the Younger and the king ceded the Bavarian duchy to his own brother Henry I instead, on the grounds that he was married to Arnulf's daughter Judith. In 976, Henry the Younger received a certain compensation from Emperor Otto II with the newly established Duchy of Carinthia, and even managed to regain the Bavarian ducal title in 983. Only two years later, however, he had to yield that title to the force of the Ottonian Duke Henry the Wrangler. With the death of Henry the Younger in 989, the line of the Luitpoldings ended.

== Genealogy ==
=== Genealogical table ===
Luitpold (died 907), Margrave of Carinthia and Upper Pannonia, Count in the Nordgau
⚭ 1. N.N.

- Arnulf the Bad (died 937), 907-937 Duke of Bavaria, 921 has to accept the overlordship of King Henry the Fowler
  - Eberhard, 937-938 Duke of Bavaria, 938 deposed and banned by King Otto I of Germany
  - Arnulf II (913 – 954), 938 Bavarian Count palatine
    - Berthold of Reisensburg (930 – 999), Bavarian Count Palatine
  - (?) Berthold of Schweinfurt, mentioned as Arnulf's son in older literature, known to be Leopold of Austria's brother or uncle, Count of Schweinfurt, Margrave of the Nordgau, founder of the House of Schweinfurt
    - Henry of Schweinfurt, Margrave of the Nordgau
  - Judith, Duchess of Bavaria (925 – 985), married Henry I (younger brother of King Otto I, 939-940 Duke of Lotharingia, 948-955 Duke of Bavaria until his death in 955), 955-972 Regent of Bavaria during the minority of her son Henry the Wrangler
  - (?) Leopold I, Margrave of Austria, mentioned as Arnulf's son or grandson in older literature, known to be Berthold of Schweinfurt's brother or nephew, founder of the House of Babenberg

⚭ 2. Kunigunde of Swabia (c. 882 – 915), an Alaholfing, sister of Count Erchanger, possibly a daughter of Count palatine Berchthold I of Swabia a sister of Empress Richardis, remarried King Conrad I after Luitpold's death

- Berthold (died 947), 938-947 Duke of Bavaria (upon the deposition of his nephew Eberhard)
  - Henry the Younger, 976-978 Duke of Carinthia, 983-985 Duke of Bavaria, 985-989 Duke of Carinthia

=== Schematic family tree ===
The key Luitpoldings are shown below. Since heraldry did not yet exist, a plain grey coat of arms for the Luitpoldings has been added only for people to be easily recognized. The reconstruction is uncertain and based on Roskilde Historie. The addition of Berthold of Schweinfurt and Leopold I of Austria and their descendants here is tentative.

N.N.
Luitpold ⚭ 1. N.N. ⚭ 2. Kunigunde Alaholfing of Swabia	Herold
Arnulf I, the Bad ⚭ Judith of Friuli	Berthold ⚭ Wiltrude von Bergen
Eberhard ⚭ Liutgarde of Lotharingia	Arnulf II ⚭ N.N.	Judith ⚭ Henry I of Bavaria	Berthold of Schweinfurt ⚭ Eilika of Walbeck	Henry III, the Younger ⚭ Gisela of Burgundy
Wichburg ⚭ Hartwig I Walpot von Isengau	Wichfried	Berthold ⚭ N.N. of Lotharingia	Counts of Schweinfurt	Leopold I ⚭ Richeza of Saulafeldgau
Fredrick ⚭ Emma (Kunigunde) von Oehningen	Counts of Scheyern	Margraves of Babenberg
Counts of Dießen	Counts of Andechs	House of Wittelsbach	Dukes of Babenberg

Duke
Landgrave / Margrave / Count Palatinate
Count

=== Descendants ===
- Counts of Diessen and Andechs (likely)
  - These extinct noble houses are thought to descend from Arnulf II the son of Arnulf the Bad.
- Younger House of Babenberg (possibly)
  - Leopold I is known to have been either a brother or a nephew of Berthold of Schweinfurt, and he is speculated to be a grandson of Luitpold I through Arnulf the Bad.> Alternatively, they could have descended through a sister of Luitpold instead. In addition, Leopold I, the House's progenitor, was married to Richardis, the daughter of Count Ernest IV of Sualafeldgau (an Ernstide and distant cousin of Luitpold).
- Counts of Schweinfurt (possibly)
  - Berthold of Schweinfurt, founder of the House of Schweinfurt and a possible ancestor of the Counts of Scheyern and the later Wittelsbach dynasty, is also speculated to be a grandson of Luitpold I through Arnulf the Bad. Alternatively, as the Babenberger, they could have descended through a sister of Luitpold instead.
- Counts of Scheyern and House of Wittelsbach (possibly)
  - An affiliation with the Bavarian House of Wittelsbach is possible through the Counts of Schweinfurt. Count palatine Arnulf II had a castle built at Scheyern around 940; the descendants of Count Otto I of Scheyern are rated as ancestors of the Wittelsbachs.
- Babonids
  - The Babonids are sometimes thought to be descending from the Luitpoldings, but it is more likely that the same caveat exists for them as the Schweinfurt and Younger Babenberger, i.e. that they are likely descending from a sister of Luitpold. In addition, Count Babo I, the House's progenitor, was married to Kunigunda of Bavaria, a possible daughter of the Luitpolding Duke Berthold of Bavaria.
