= Margraviate of the Nordgau =

Administrative unit of the Duchy of Bavaria

Margraviate of the Nordgau Marcgraveschaft Nortgou
- Gau of the Duchy of Bavaria
- c. 806–1329
- Map of the March of the Nordgau within the Duchy of Bavaria c. 1000 CE. Nordgau; Other parts of Bavaria; Rest of the German Kingdom
- Capital: Munich (from 1255)
  - Type: Margraviate
- Historical era: Medieval Europe
  - Established: c. 806
  - Treaty of Pavia: 4 August 1329
Succeeded by
Egerland
Prince-Bishopric of Bamberg
Electoral Palatinate
- Today part of: Czech Republic; Germany

The Margraviate of the Nordgau (Modern German: Markgrafschaft Nordgau, Middle High German: Marcgraveschaft Nortgou) or Bavarian Nordgau (Bayerischer Nordgau) was a medieval administrative unit (Gau) on the northern frontiers of the Duchy of Bavaria. It comprised the region north of the Danube and Regensburg, roughly covered by the modern Upper Palatinate, and stretching towards the Upper Franconia. Its eastern borders towards the Duchy of Bohemia were guarded by marches centred in Cham and Nabburg.

== History ==
Nordgau during the 11th and 12th centuries

The area east of Franconia proper up to the Bohemian Forest had been settled by Germanic Varisci and Armalausi tribes in ancient times; after the Migration Period, the forces of the proto-Merovingian king Chlodio (died c. 450) occupied the district. From the mid-6th century onwards, the region was Christianised by several wandering bishops, among them Saints Boniface (lived c. 675 to 754) and Emmeram of Regensburg. In 739, the Diocese of Regensburg was founded. At the insistence of Saint Boniface, Charles Martel (lived c. 688 to 741) built the great fortress of Wogastisburg.

When King Charlemagne deposed Duke Tassilo III of Bavaria in 788, he entered the Nordgau and brought the Carolingian Empire into contact with Bohemia permanently. For this reason, the incorporated Nordgau has been called the Bohemian March on occasion, although this term also designates the later Margraviate of Moravia. By an 806 deed issued at Thionville, Charlemagne separated out the Bavarian lands on the left bank of the Danube, including the ducal residences of Regensburg and Lauterhofen, called pagum, qui dicitur Northgowe. His chancellor Einhard submitted the deed to Pope Leo III for confirmation.

The Nordgau was again separated from Bavaria following the death of the Luitpolding duke Arnulf in 937. There has been some confusion over whether or not the Nordgau was separated from Bavaria at this date or only as late as 976, when the East Franconian count Berthold of Schweinfurt, who had helped to suppress the rebellion of the Bavarian duke Henry the Wrangler against Emperor Otto II, was appointed margrave to administrate the region as a distinct march.

Likewise, Berthold's son Count Henry of Schweinfurt appeared as Margrave of the Nordgau in 994. He backed the election of Duke Henry IV of Bavaria as King of the Romans in 1002, however, the new king (Henry II) responded with ingratitude. Count Henry soon after joined a revolt (the Schweinfurt feud of 1003) in association with the German–Polish War (1002–1018) against the Polish ruler Bolesław I the Brave, after which he was deposed and arrested. In 1004, King Henry II installed his brother-in-law, Count Henry of Luxembourg, as Bavarian duke and gave the temporal authority of the Nordgau region over to the Bishopric of Bamberg, which he heavily favoured throughout his career. However, the margravial title survived in a succession of families in the region. Count Henry's possessions were partly restored and his descendants used the title "Margrave of Schweinfurt".

Throughout the 11th and 12th centuries, the Nordgau functioned as a pathway for invading armies from Bohemia and Hungary and for the countering armies of the Holy Roman Empire. In the mid-11th century, the Salian emperor Henry III had an Imperial castle erected at Cham to encounter the forces of Duke Bretislav I of Bohemia. It became the residence of the Rapotonen noble family, who eventually received the margravial title by royal grant about 1073, passing it down as "Margrave of Vohburg" to their descendants.

Margrave Diepold III (d. 1146) was a loyal supporter of Emperor Henry V and founder of the abbeys in Reichenbach and Waldsassen. From about 1125, he had the fortress of Eger (Cheb) erected at the border with Bohemia. His daughter Adelaide married the Swabian duke and later emperor Frederick Barbarossa in 1147.

The Egerland was incorporated as a Hohenstaufen imperial territory upon Diepold's death and the town of Eger itself was inherited by Emperor Frederick Barbarossa in 1167. It attained the immediate status of an Imperial city, while the Bavarian House of Wittelsbach controlled large parts of the Nordgau from the mid-13th century onwards. In 1322, the Wittelsbach emperor Louis IV gave the Egerland in pawn to the Kingdom of Bohemia. By the 1329 Treaty of Pavia, he ceded the remaining Nordgau region to his Palatinate nephews Rudolf II and Rupert I, whereafter it became known as the "Upper Palatinate" (German: Oberpfalz).

== Margraves ==
- Ernest (d. 865), served until 861
- Rodold (d. c. 880), served 861–c. 880
- Engildeo (d. aft. 895), served c. 880–895
- Luitpold (d. 907), served 895–903
- Poppo of Thuringia (d. 906), served from 903
- Arnulf (d. 937), served 907–937
- Berthold of Schweinfurt (d. 980), served from 976
- Henry of Schweinfurt (970–1017), served 994–1004
- Otto of Schweinfurt (d. 1057), served 1024–1031
- Henry II of Hildrizhausen (d. 1078)
- Diepold II of Vohburg (d. 1078)
- Diepold III of Vohburg (d. 1146), served 1093–1146

== See also ==
- History of Bavaria
- Bavaria Slavica

== Sources ==
- Bowlus, Charles R. (1995). Franks, Moravians, and Magyars: The Struggle for the Middle Danube, 788-907. Philadelphia: University of Pennsylvania Press.
- Goldberg, Eric J. (2006). Struggle for Empire: Kingship and Conflict under Louis the German, 817-876. Ithaca, NY: Cornell University Press.
- Reuter, Timothy (2013) [1991]. Germany in the Early Middle Ages c. 800–1056. London and New York: Routledge.
- Stieldorf, Andrea (2026) [2012]. Marken und Markgrafen: Studien zur Grenzsicherung durch die fränkisch-deutschen Herrscher (2nd ed.). Wiesbaden: Harrassowitz Verlag.
- Thompson, James Westfall. (1928). Feudal Germany, Volume II. New York: Frederick Ungar Publishing.
