= Engeldeo =

9th-century Bavarian monarch

Engeldeo or Engildeo (floruit 878–895) was the Margrave of Bavaria from 890 to 895.

The first reference to Engeldeo dates to 3 December 878, when he was already a comes (count), for on that date King Carloman granted land in the pagus of "Tonageuue" in Engeldeo's county to a priest named Iob. In 889 King Arnulf granted land at "Phuncina" (from Latin Pons Aeni, modern Innsbruck) in the pagus of the Nordgau in Engeldeo's county to a certain Gotahelm, Engeldeo's vassal.

Under the year 895, the Annales Fuldenses record that "Engildieo marchensis Baioariorum" (Engeldeo, margrave of the Bavarians) was deprived of his benefices and removed from office, replaced by Luitpold. At the same time the annalist records that Hildegard, daughter of Louis the Younger, was accused of acting unfaithfully towards King Arnulf and deprived of her benefices (publicis honoribus). On 5 May that year Arnulf had had to intervene to return some land wrongfully taken from Megingoz, a vassal of Erkenbold, Bishop of Eichstätt, by Engeldeo and Hildegard. That these latter two were acting in concert at the same time as they were both deprived of public office in Bavaria suggests that they were allies against the interests of the king. Perhaps they were kinsman, perhaps they were engaged in an affair. The king's action was justified by the "judgement of the Franks, Bavarians, Saxons, and Alemans".
