= Erchanger, Duke of Swabia =

Erchanger or Erchangar (c. 860/880 – 21 January 917) was the duke of Swabia from September 915 to his death. He was the son of Berthold I, count palatine of Swabia, who is sometimes called Erchanger as well, in which case the duke is Erchanger II. His mother was possibly Gisela, daughter of Louis the German and his family is known as the Ahalolfinger.

He was originally a missus dominicus in Swabia. In 911, he allied with Bishop Solomon III of Constance due their common political goals. At the time, Erchanger was striving for greater political power in Swabia at the expense of duke Burchard I and his son Burchard II, and he played a part in the downfall of the elder Burchard, who was convicted of high treason and executed in 911. With the fall of the Burchards, Erchanger and his younger brother Berthold were the most powerful counts in the tribe. In 913, Erchanger and King Conrad I of Germany fell out, but Erchanger married off his sister Cunigunda, whose husband, Luitpold, had just died, to the king. With this diplomatic marriage, Erchanger became the king's representative in Swabia. With this, his alliance with Bishop Solomon broke and the bishop opposed his rise. Seeing his income diminished by the bishop, Erchanger imprisoned Solomon in 914. Conrad opposed this and freed the bishop, exiling Erchanger.

Erchanger returned in 915 and was fighting alongside his nephew Arnulf of Bavaria and his old enemy Burchard II against the Magyars. Erchanger and Burchard then turned against Conrad. Defeating him at the Battle of Wahlwies in the Hegau, Erchanger was proclaimed duke. (Note: Jackman contends that primary sources make no mention who Erchanger was fighting at Wahlwies.) However, at a high court in Hohenaltheim in September 916, Erchanger was condemned to a monastery for offences against king and bishop. He was executed on the instructions of the king on 21 January 917.

== Sources ==
- Duckett, Eleanor Shipley (1988). Death and Life in the Tenth Century. The University of Michigan Press.
- Jackman, Donald C. (2009). Ius hereditarium Encountered II: Approaches to Reginlint. Editions Enlaplage.

Regnal titles
Preceded by Burchard I	Duke of Swabia; 915–917	Succeeded by Burchard II
