= Stem duchy =

Constituent duchy of the Kingdom of Germany during the 10th century

The Holy Roman Empire, circa 1000 Duchy of Saxony Lower Lorraine Upper Lorraine Duchy of Franconia Duchy of Swabia Duchy of Bavaria

A stem duchy (German: Stammesherzogtum, from Stamm, meaning "tribe", in reference to the Franks, Saxons, Bavarians and Swabians) was a constituent duchy of the Kingdom of Germany at the time of the extinction of the Carolingian dynasty (death of Louis the Child in 911) and through the transitional period leading to the formation of the Ottonian Empire. The Carolingians had dissolved the original tribal duchies in the 8th century, but as the Carolingian Empire declined during the 9th century, the old tribal areas assumed new identities. The five stem duchies (sometimes also called "younger stem duchies" in contrast to the pre-Carolingian tribal duchies) were Bavaria, Franconia, Lotharingia, Saxony and Swabia (Alamannia). The Salian emperors (reigned 1027–1125) retained the stem duchies as the major divisions of Germany, but already during the reign of Hohenstaufen emperors (reigned 1138–1254), the process of their dissolution was formalized, leading to divisions of traditional stem duchies into smaller and more numerous territorial duchies.

The term Stammesherzogtum as used in German historiography dates to the mid-19th century, and from the beginning was closely related to the question of national unification. The term's applicability, and the nature of the stem duchies in medieval Germany, consequently have a long history of controversy.

The overly literal or etymologizing English translation "stem duchy" was coined in the early 20th century. While later authors tend to clarify the term by using the alternative translation "tribal", use of the term "stem duchies" has become conventional.

== German tribes (Stämme) ==
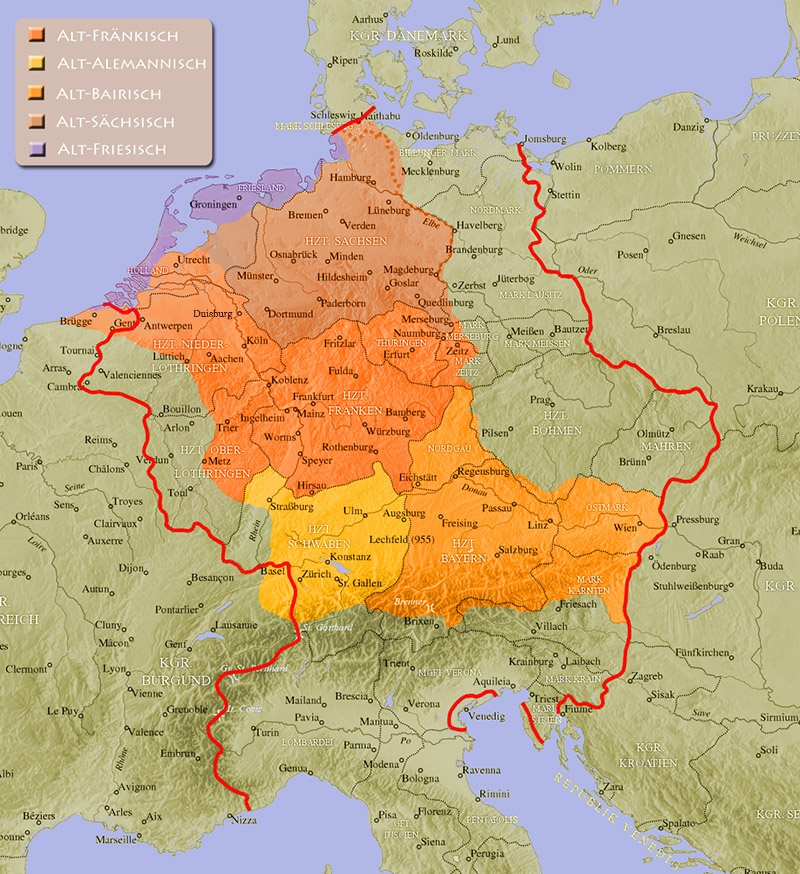
Linguistic map of Old High German (Alemannic and Bavarian), Old Frankish, Old Saxon and Old Frisian at the time of Otto I, 10th century

The derivation of the German people from a number of German tribes (Deutsche Stämme; Volksstämme) developed in 18th to 19th century German historiography and ethnography. This concept of German "stems" relates to the early and high medieval period and is to be distinguished from the more generic Germanic tribes of late antiquity. A distinction was sometimes made between the "ancient stems" (Altstämme), which were in existence in the 10th century, and "recent stems" (Neustämme), which emerged in the high medieval period as a result of eastward expansion. The delineation of the two concepts is necessarily vague, and as a result the concept has a history of political and academic dispute. The terms Stamm, Nation or Volk variously used in modern German historiography reflect the Middle Latin gens, natio or populus of the medieval source material.

Traditional German historiography counts six Altstämme or "ancient stems", viz. Bavarians, Swabians (Alemanni), Franks, Saxons, Frisians and Thuringians. All of these were incorporated in the Carolingian Empire by the late 8th century. Only four of them are represented in the later stem duchies; the former Merovingian duchy of Thuringia was absorbed into Saxony in 908 while the former Frisian Kingdom had been conquered into Francia already in 734. The customary or tribal laws of these groups were recorded in the early medieval period (Lex Baiuvariorum, Lex Alamannorum, Lex Salica and Lex Ripuaria, Lex Saxonum, Lex Frisionum and Lex Thuringorum). Franconian, Saxon and Swabian law remained in force and competed with imperial law well into the 13th century.

The list of "recent stems" or Neustämme, is much less definite and subject to considerable variation; groups that have been listed under this heading include the Märker, Lausitzer, Mecklenburger, Upper Saxons, Pomeranians, Silesians, and East Prussians, roughly reflecting German settlement activity during the 12th to 15th centuries.

The use of Stämme, "tribes", rather than Völker "nations, peoples", emerged in the early 19th century in the context of the project of German unification. Karl Friedrich Eichhorn in 1808 still used Deutsche Völker "German nations". Friedrich Christoph Dahlmann in 1815 asked for unity of the German nation (Volk) in its tribes (in seinen Stämmen). This terminology became standard and is reflected in the preamble of the Weimar constitution of 1919, reading Das deutsche Volk, einig in seinen Stämmen [...] "The German nation (people), united in its tribes (stems) ...".

The composition of the German population of these stems or tribes as a historical reality is mostly recognized in contemporary historiography, while the caveat is frequently made that each of them should be treated as an individual case with a different history of ethnogenesis, although some historians have revived the terminology of "peoples" (Völker) rather than "tribes" (Stämme).

The division remains in current use in the former classification of German dialects into Franconian, Alemannic, Thuringian, Bavarian and Low Saxon (including Friso-Saxon, with Frisian languages being regarded as a separate language). In the Free State of Bavaria, the division into "Bavarian stems" (bayerische Stämme) remains current for the populations of Altbayern (Bavaria proper), Franconia and Swabia.

== East Francia ==
Within East Francia were large duchies, sometimes called kingdoms (regna) after their former status, which had a certain level of internal solidarity. Early among these were Saxony and Bavaria, which had been conquered by Charlemagne, and Alamannia, placed under Frankish administration in 746. In German historiography they are called the jüngere Stammesherzogtümer, or "more recent tribal duchies", although the term "stem duchies" is common in English. The duchies are often called "younger" (newer, more recent, etc.) in order to distinguish them from the older duchies which were vassal-states of the Merovingian monarchs. Historian Herwig Wolfram denied any real distinction between older and younger stem duchies, or between the stem duchies of Germany and similar territorial principalities in other parts of the Carolingian empire:

I am attempting to refute the whole hallowed doctrine of the difference between the beginnings of the West-Frankish, "French", principautés territoriales, and the East-Frankish, "German", stem-duchies. . . Certainly, their names had already appeared during the Migrations. Yet, their political institutional, and biological structures had more often than not thoroughly changed. I have, moreover, refuted the basic difference between the so-called älteres Stammesfürstentum [older tribal principalities] and jüngeres Stammesfürstentum [newer tribal principalities], since I consider the duchies before and after Charlemagne to have been basically the same Frankish institution. . .

After the division of the Kingdom in the Treaty of Verdun (843), Treaty of Meerssen (870), and Treaty of Ribemont (880), the Eastern Frankish Kingdom or East Francia was formed out of Bavaria, Alemannia, and Saxony together with eastern parts of the Frankish territory. The kingdom was divided in 864–865 among the sons of Louis the German, largely along the lines of the tribes. Royal power quickly disintegrated after 899 under the rule of Louis the Child, which allowed local magnates to revive the duchies as autonomous entities and rule their tribes under the supreme authority of the King.

== Holy Roman Empire ==
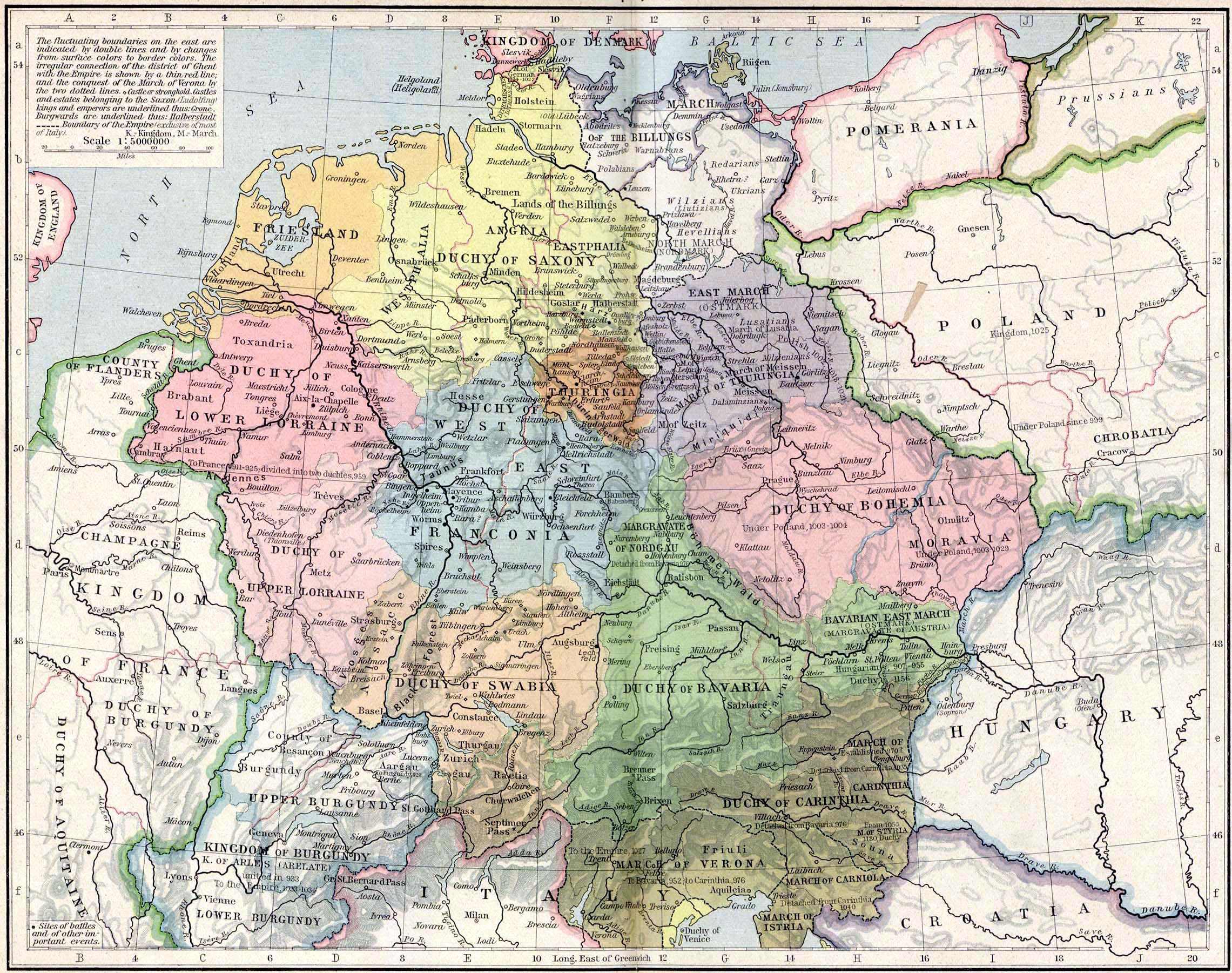
The Eastern Frankish Kingdom (919–1125) with the later stem duchies: Saxony in yellow, Franconia in blue, Bavaria in green, Swabia in light orange, and Lotharingia in pink

After the death of the last Carolingian, Louis the Child, in 911, the stem duchies acknowledged the unity of the kingdom. The dukes gathered and elected Conrad I to be their king. According to Tellenbach's thesis, the dukes created the duchies during Conrad's reign. No duke attempted to set up an independent kingdom. Even after the death of Conrad in 918, when the election of Henry the Fowler was disputed, his rival, Arnulf, Duke of Bavaria, did not establish a separate kingdom but claimed the whole, before being forced by Henry to submit to royal authority. Henry may even have promulgated a law stipulating that the kingdom would thereafter be united. Arnulf continued to rule it like a king even after his submission, but after his death in 937 it was quickly brought under royal control by Henry's son Otto the Great. The Ottonians worked to preserve the duchies as offices of the crown, but by the reign of Henry IV the dukes had made them functionally hereditary.

The five stem duchies were:

Franconia (until 939)
The Conradine family, close to the royal court, obtained ducal hegemony in Franconia but never managed to fully unify the region. Franconia did not encompass the entire tribal territory of the Franks, known as Austrasia, that was split into three parts by the Treaty of Verdun of 843. The southeastern part of Austrasia on the middle Rhine and Main rivers was awarded to the East Frankish Realm and became known as Franconia. After attaining the Kingship in 911, the Conradines had to yield the crown to the Saxon Liudolfings. After a failed rebellion, the Conradines were deposed and the Duchy made into a land of the crown. The region fragmented into a conglomerate of noble territories and ecclesiastical principalities as early as 939 and was never restored as a political entity or administrative division. Neither did Franconia retain its cultural or linguistic identity; the Franconian dialects are now arrayed along the dialect continuum known as the "Rhenish fan", split into High Franconian, Central Franconian and Low Franconian branches and their sub-dialects.

Lotharingia (until 959-965)
As a core region of the Frankish kingdom, with an essentially Frankish tribal identity, central parts of Austrasia along the Moselle river were initially organized as a Mosellan duchy (Latin: ducatus Moslensis; ducatum Mosselicorum) that existed in the second half of the 8th century, and in the first half of the 9th century. That region was awarded to the Middle Frankish Kingdom in 843, later becoming nucleus of the newly created realm of king Lothair II (855-869), known as Lotharingia. By 903, it was reorganized into the Stem Duchy of Lotharingia. The region kept changing position between the Eastern and the Western kingdoms until 939, when it was finally incorporated into the Eastern Kingdom. In 959-965, the Duchy was divided into two distinctive jurisdictions, one for the norther half, that became known as the Duchy of Lower Lotharingia, and the other for the southern half, that became known as the Duchy of Upper Lotharingia. By the end of the 12th century, Lower Lotharingia (also known as Lower Lorraine) was dissolved into several minor duchies and other territories, while Upper Lotharingia (also known as Upper Lorraine) remained a duchy, also known in sources as the Duchy of Mosellans (Latin: Ducatus Mosellanorum), with its duke being titled as the Duke of Mosellans (Latin: dux Mosellanorum), but the old Lotharingian ducal traditions prevailed, and the southern duchy became known simply as the Duchy of Lorraine.

Swabia (until 1268)
Alamannia had been nominally associated with the Frankish kingdom since the end of the 5th century, but it became a duchy under direct Frankish control only in 746. The names Alemannia and Swabia were used more or less interchangeably during the high medieval period. The Thurgau-based Hunfridings first rose to the position of Dukes but soon lost the rule in their struggle with the Liudolfing kings. After various families, the Duchy passed to the Hohenstaufen family in 1079. Their rise to the Kingship made Swabia a royal base, but their fall in the 13th century left Swabia in complete disarray, with remains falling to the Wittelsbach, Württemberg, and Habsburg families, the latter soon after facing the secession of the Old Swiss Confederacy. The core territory of Swabia continued its existence as the County of Württemberg, raised to the status of Duchy in 1495, which in turn became the Kingdom of Württemberg within 19th-century Germany.

Saxony (until 1296)
The Liudolfing family, which had long been employed in the administration of Saxony, rose to the position of Dukes and even Kings after 919. In the 11th century, the Duchy was ruled by the Billungs. After 1137 the House of Welf dominated the duchy. The fall of Duke Henry the Lion in 1180 resulted in the dismantling of the stem duchy, splitting off the Duchy of Westphalia and the Duchy of Brunswick-Lüneburg, leaving a core Duchy of Saxony on the river Elbe, enfeoffed to the Ascanians. This remainder was eventually split into Saxe-Lauenburg and Saxe-Wittenberg in 1296, the latter raised to the status of Electorate in 1356, which became independent as the Kingdom of Saxony after the disintegration of the Holy Roman Empire.

Bavaria
The Luitpolding family, responsible for the defense of the March of Carinthia, rose to the position of Dukes. They were succeeded by a branch of the Liudolfing dynasty and eventually the Welfs, whose struggle with the Hohenstaufen Kings resulted in Bavaria being stripped of Austria (1156), Styria and Tyrol (1180). The reduced territorial duchy was given to the Wittelsbach family. Bavaria remained under the control of the Wittelsbach family until the First World War, although it was repeatedly divided into sub-duchies among branches of the family during the 13th to 15th centuries, re-united under Albert IV, Duke of Bavaria in 1503. In 1623, it was raised to the status of Electorate, and following the disintegration of the Holy Roman Empire it became independent as a Kingdom.

== Legacy ==
The complicated political history of the Holy Roman Empire during Middle Ages led to the division or disestablishment of most early medieval duchies. Frederick Barbarossa in 1180 abolished the system of stem duchies in favour of more numerous territorial duchies. The duchy of Bavaria is the only stem duchy that made the transition to territorial duchy, eventually emerging as the Free State of Bavaria within modern Germany. Some of the other stem duchies emerged as divisions of the Holy Roman Empire; thus, the Electorate of Saxony, while not directly continuing the duchy of Saxony, gives rise to the modern state of Saxony. The duchies of Franconia and Swabia, on the other hand, disintegrated and correspond only vaguely to the contemporary regions of Swabia and Franconia. The Merovingian duchy of Thuringia did not become a stem duchy of the Holy Roman Empire but was demoted to landgraviate within Saxony in 908, and the modern state of Thuringia was established in 1920.

== See also ==
- Imperial circle
- Kingdom of Germany
- Peerage of France
- Prince-elector

== Sources ==
- Anton, Hans Hubert (1986). "Verfassungsgeschichtliche Kontinuität und Wandlungen von der Spätantike zum Hohen Mittelalter: Das Beispiel Trier". Francia: Forschungen zur westeuropäischen Geschichte. 14: 1–25.
- Hirschmann, Frank G. (2005). "Landesbewußtsein im Westen des Reiches? Die Niederlande, die Rheinlande und Lothringen". Spätmittelalterliches Landesbewußtsein in Deutschland. Ostfildern: Jan Thorbecke Verlag. pp. 223–264.
- MacLean, Simon (2013). "Shadow Kingdom: Lotharingia and the Frankish World, c. 850–c. 1050". History Compass. 11 (6): 443–457.
- Nelson, Janet L., ed. (1991). The Annals of St-Bertin. Manchester: Manchester University Press.
- Pernot, François (2014). "L'Europe «lotharingienne», une idée géopolitique IXe-XXIe siècles". Revue de géographie historique. 4: 3–23.
- Reuter, Timothy (2013) [1991]. Germany in the Early Middle Ages c. 800–1056. London and New York: Routledge.
- Schneider, Jens (2010). Auf der Suche nach dem verlorenen Reich: Lotharingien im 9. und 10. Jahrhundert. Köln: Böhlau Verlag.
- West, Charles (2023). The Fall of a Carolingian Kingdom: Lotharingia, 855-869. Toronto: University of Toronto Press.
