= Berthold of Schweinfurt =

German nobleman (died 980)

- Died: 15 January 980
- Noble family: Popponids (House of Babenberg) or Luitpoldings
- Spouse: Eilika of Walbeck
- Issue: Henry of Schweinfurt; Bucco; Hedwig (possibly)
- Father: (?) Henry III of Babenberg, Arnulf, Duke of Bavaria, Berthold, Duke of Bavaria

Berthold of Schweinfurt (died 15 January 980) was a German nobleman.

== Life ==
He was first mentioned as a Count in 941. In 960, he was mentioned as Count in the Radenzgau. In 961, he appears as count on the lower Raab and in 973 as count in the Volkfeld shire. After successful battles in Bohemia and Hungary, he was named as Margrave in 976. In 980, he appears as count in eastern Franconia.

His background is disputed. He is often assumed to be a son of Henry III of Babenberg of the Popponid (Elder House of Babenberg) family and a Luitpolding mother. Alternatively, he may have been a son (or grandson) of Arnulf, Duke of Bavaria or his brother Berthold, Duke of Bavaria, both from the Luitpolding dynasty. It is certain that his brother, or nephew, Leopold I, Margrave of Austria was the founder of the Younger or Austrian House of Babenberg. The name 'Leopold' is a modernization of 'Luitpold', and would strengthen the argument for ties with the Luitpoldingers.

The Comes Bertholdus who was mentioned in 941, was tasked by Emperor Otto I with guarding Lothar II, Count of Walbeck, who had been taken prisoner. Lothar was pardoned the following year, and Berthold married his daughter Eilika (d. 19 August 1015). She later initiated the construction of the minster in Schweinfurt, where she was buried.

In 964, Berthold was tasked by Otto with guarding another prisoner, King Berengar II of Italy, who was kept prisoner in Bamberg. In 973, Berthold participated in the ousting of the rebellious Henry II, Duke of Bavaria.

== Marriage and issue ==
Berthold was married to Eilika (or Eila) of Walbeck, daughter of Lothar II, Count of Walbeck. They had at least two children:

- Henry of Schweinfurt (d. 18 September 1017), who was Berthold's heir
- Bucco, who was mentioned in 1003
- possibly a daughter named Hedwig, mother of Cunigunde of Luxembourg

In 1010, a lady named Eilika was abbess of Niedernburg Abbey in Passau. It is thought this Eilika may have been a daughter of Berthold and his wife.
