= Berthold, Duke of Bavaria =

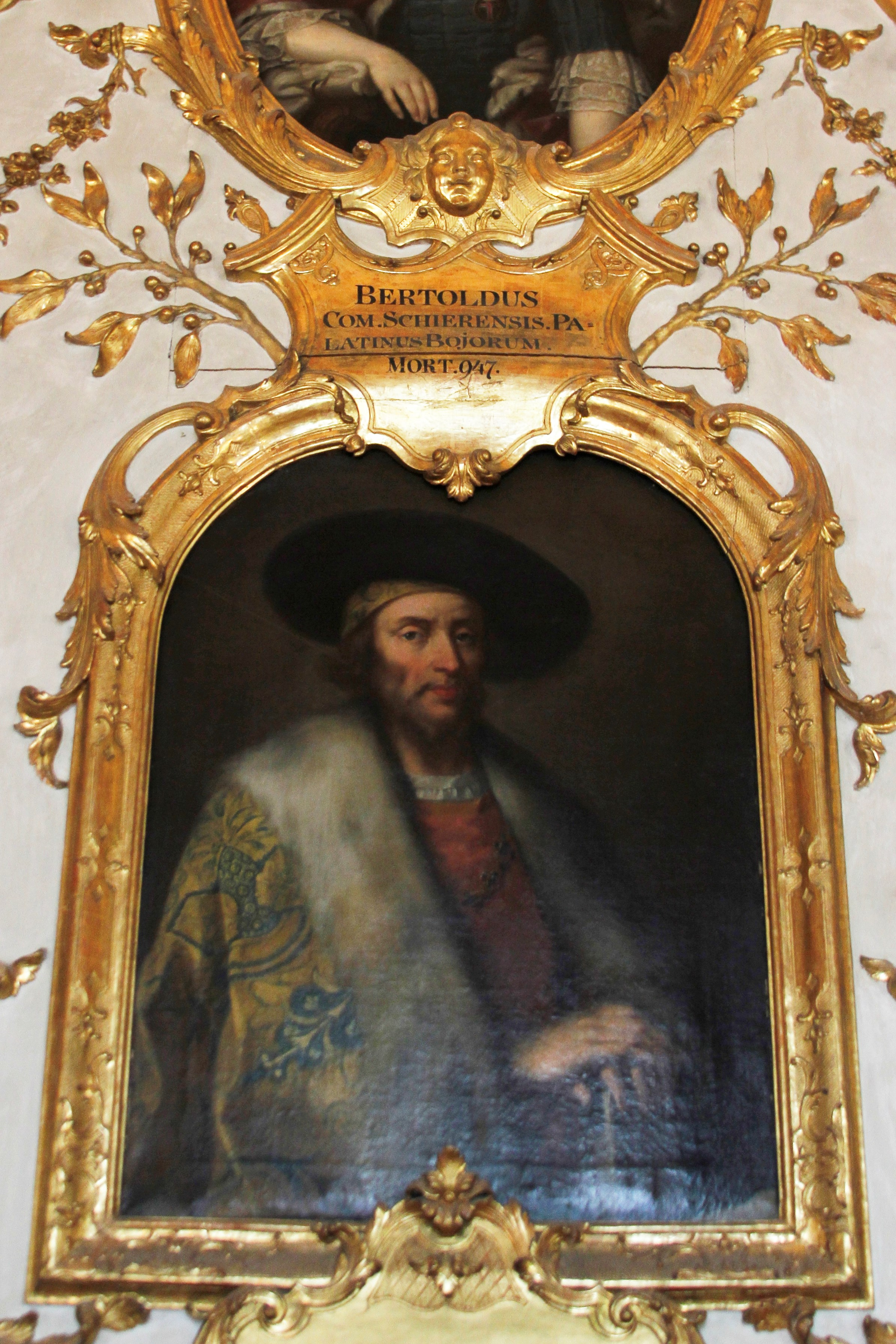
Berthold, Duke of Bavaria

Berthold (c. 900 – 23 November 947), of the Luitpolding dynasty, was the younger son of Margrave Luitpold of Bavaria and Cunigunde of Swabia. He followed his nephew Eberhard as Duke of Bavaria in 938.

It is known that Berthold was a count in the March of Carinthia in 926 while his elder brother Arnulf the Bad was Bavarian duke. In 927 German King Henry the Fowler vested him with ducal rights in Carinthia. When in 938, Arnulf's son and successor Eberhard tried to retain the autonomous status of the Bavarian duchy, he was removed and banished by King Otto I the Great, who appointed Berthold in his place.

Unlike the powerful late duke Arnulf, Berthold was not given the right to appoint bishops or administer royal property, but he remained loyal to the Ottonian dynasty throughout his reign. He even planned to marry Otto's sister Gerberga, widow of Duke Gilbert of Lorraine, and later Hedwige, another sister, but these plans fell through. Instead he married Biltrude, a Bavarian noblewoman, about 939. In 943, he dealt defeat to the Magyars at the battle of Wels (12 August) and staved off their attacks for a while, as Arnulf had done before him.

With Berthold's accession to the throne, Bavaria and the Carinthian march were once again united. After his death in 947, however, King Otto I the Great did not enfeoff Berthold's minor son Henry the Younger with his duchy, but instead gave it to his own brother Henry I, who had married Arnulf's daughter Judith. In 976 Henry the Younger received the severed Duchy of Carinthia in compensation.

Duke Berthold is buried at Niederaltaich Abbey.

== Sources ==
- Leyser, Karl (1965). "The Battle at the Lech, 955. A Study in Tenth-Century Warfare". History. 50 (168). Wiley: 1–25. doi:10.1111/j.1468-229X.1965.tb01113.x.

Berthold, Duke of Bavaria Luitpolding Died: 947
New title	Duke of Carinthia; 927–938	Vacant Title next held by Henry I
Preceded by Eberhard	Duke of Bavaria; 938–947	Succeeded by Henry I
