= Arnulf, Duke of Bavaria =

German duke (d. 937)

Arnulf II
- Duke of Bavaria
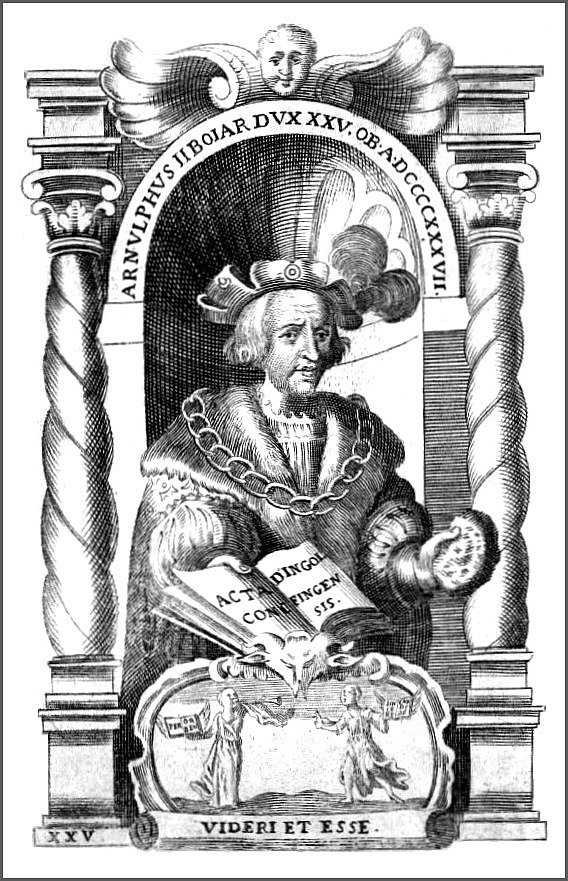
- Reign: 907–937
- Died: 14 July 937; Regensburg, Bavaria
- Buried: St. Emmeram's Abbey
- Noble family: Luitpoldings
- Spouse: Judith
- Issue: Eberhard, Duke of Bavaria; Judith, Duchess of Bavaria
- Father: Luitpold, Margrave of Bavaria
- Mother: Cunigunde of Swabia

Arnulf II (birth unknown; died 14 July 937), also known as the Bad (German: der Schlimme), the Evil (der Böse) or the Wicked, a member of the Luitpolding dynasty, held the title of Duke of Bavaria from about 907 until his death in 937. He is numbered in succession to Arnulf of Carinthia, counted as Arnulf I.

== Life ==
The year of Arnulf's birth is unknown, but it is said that he was the namesake of other Arnulfs born around the time of the reign of the seventh-century bishop Arnulf of Metz and the Carolingian king Arnulf of Carinthia. Arnulf was the son of Margrave Luitpold of Bavaria and Cunigunde, herself a member of the Ahalolfing dynasty, daughter of Berthold I, the count palatine of Swabia. Her brother Erchanger assumed the Swabian ducal title in 915.

Under the weak rule of the East Frankish king Louis the Child, Margrave Luitpold had already achieved a strong position in the Bavarian lands, succeeding the Wilhelminer margraves. He ruled over extended estates along the Danube with Regensburg (Ratisbon), and in the adjacent Nordgau.

=== Duke of Bavaria ===
Together with numerous Bavarian nobles, Arnulf's father was killed in the 907 Battle of Pressburg (Bratislava), when the Bavarian Heerbann under his command suffered a crushing defeat in a campaign against the Hungarian forces of Grand Prince Árpád. After the death of his father, Arnulf succeeded him in his Bavarian lands, and soon after he assumed the title of a "Duke of Bavaria" as ruler of the estates around Regensburg. An energetic and combative man, he received broad support from the local nobles, however, already during his ascension in to dukedom, he was faced with constant raids from the Hungarians. These attacks had laid waste the East Frankish lands of Bavaria, Saxony, and Thuringia.

Besieged by frequent Hungarian raids and desperate to raise funds to finance a re-organized defense, Arnulf strengthened his power through confiscation of church lands and the secularization of numerous monastery estates, which earned him the nickname "the Bad" by medieval chroniclers. In several skirmishes he was able to force back the Hungarian invaders and he defeated them in battle in 913 with the support of his Swabian relatives. Having re-established the stem duchy of Bavaria, he eventually negotiated a truce with the Hungarian princes, who thereafter largely passed through Bavaria on their raids into other German duchies.

=== Imperial politics ===
Duke Arnulf pursued a policy of independence from the East Frankish kings. Though in 911 he participated in the election of King Conrad I of Germany in 911; in Conrad's conflict with Erchanger of Swabia he backed his Swabian uncle and later challenged Conrad's Saxon successor, King Henry the Fowler. The dispute was only temporarily settled when in 913 Arnulf's widow mother Cunigunda married King Conrad.

In 916 Conrad's forces invaded Bavaria, attacking and pillaging Regensburg. These attacks drove Arnulf into exile with his former enemies in Hungary. In September, the king convoked a church council in Hohenaltheim, attended by the Bavarian episcopate, which summoned Arnulf and his younger brother Berthold on the grounds of excommunication at Regensburg on 1 November. It is more than likely that Arnulf and his family never appeared at the convocation, or that the council meeting was never held. As a result, they remained exiled among the Hungarians. In January 917, King Conrad, angered at the situation, called for the execution of his rebellious Swabian brother-in-law, Erchanger and his brother Berthold, giving Arnulf more pause for concern.

In 919, the death of Conrad I allowed Arnulf to return to Bavaria and expel the king's forces. Conrad I being childless, the throne was open to Arnulf, again. On his return, according to the Annales iuvavenses, in 920, Baiuarii sponte se reddiderunt Arnolfo duci et regnare ei fecerunt in regno teutonicorum ("the Bavarians freely submitted themselves to Duke Arnulf and asked him to reign within the realm of the Germans"). The 919 ascension of Henry the Fowler would bring forth a battle for the throne; however, whether the Bavarians, with some other East Franks, actually elected Arnulf anti-king in opposition to Henry has not been conclusively established.

In any case, Arnulf's "reign" was short-lived; King Henry I turned out to be a strong opponent and defeated him in two campaigns in 921. When Arnulf was besieged by Henry in Regensburg, the duke entered into peace negotiations and recognized the sovereignty of the German king. King Henry confirmed Arnulf's autonomous rule over Bavaria, including the right of investiture and several important regalia, in return for Arnulf's renunciation of his royal claim.

=== Later years ===
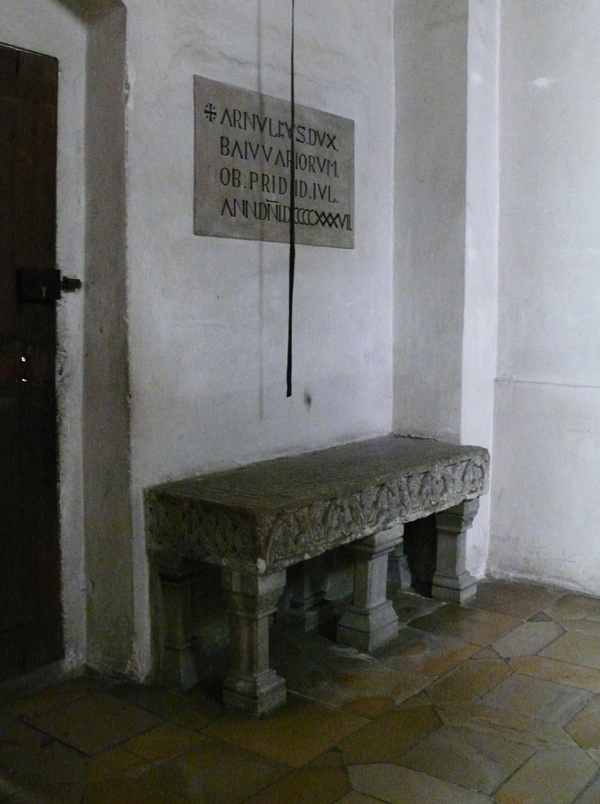
Gravestone at St. Emmeram's Abbey

Arnulf accompanied King Henry I on his 928 campaign against Duke Wenceslaus of Bohemia. In 935 he launched an attack against King Hugh of Italy to obtain the Iron Crown of Lombardy for his eldest son Eberhard, which only resulted in defeat. After King Henry had died in 936, the Duke attended the coronation of his son Otto as King of the Romans at Aachen Cathedral.

Duke Arnulf died in his Regensburg residence on 14 July 937; he was succeeded by his son Eberhard, who nevertheless was deposed by King Otto in 938. Arnulf is buried at St. Emmeram's Abbey. A commemorative plaque in tribute to him was attached to the Walhalla memorial in 1842.

== Marriage and children ==
Historians believed Arnulf was married to Judith of Friuli, a member of the Unruoching dynasty, daughter of Count Eberhard of Friuli (d. 866). The dates, however, do not match up. Judith of Friuli died ca. 881. This would have made a marriage between a boy (or at least young) Arnulf and an elder Judith, who was supposed to have produced several children 23 years or so after her death. More likely, therefore, is that he was married to Judith of Sülichgau (born ca. 888), daughter of Margrave Eberhard's grandson Count Eberhard of Sülichgau (d. after 889) and Gisela of Verona.

They had the following children:

- Eberhard (c. 912 – c. 940), Duke of Bavaria from 937 to 938
- Arnulf II (c. 913 – 954), Count palatine of Bavaria from 938
- Herman (d. 954)
- Henry
- Louis (born c. 930, died after 974)
- Judith (died after 984), married the Ottonian duke Henry I of Bavaria, brother of Otto I, Holy Roman Emperor.
- Berthold I, Margrave of Nordgau (maybe identical to Berthold, Count of Schweinfurt, Margrave of Nordgau), founder of the branch of Schweinfurt.
- Adelheid married Burkhard, Margrave of marchia orientalis (later Austria)

== Sources ==
- Bernhardt, John W. (1996). Itinerant Kingship and Royal Monasteries in Early Medieval Germany, C.936-1075. Cambridge University Press.
- Kirsch, Johann Peter (1907). "Arnulf of Bavaria" . In Herbermann, Charles (ed.). Catholic Encyclopedia. Vol. 1. New York: Robert Appleton Company.

Arnulf, Duke of Bavaria Luitpolding Died: 937
Preceded by Luitpold as margrave	Duke of Bavaria; 907–937	Succeeded by Eberhard
