= Alaholfings =

The Alaholfings (occasionally Ahalolfings) were a noble family of Alemannia in the Early Middle Ages. They were related to the previous rulers of Alemannia, to the Bavarian Agilolfings and to the Geroldings. Their original power base was around the upper Neckar and Danube rivers. They came to possess lands in not only Alemannia, but also in Bavaria, Franconia and Italy.

The Ahalolfings are divided into two groups, the older and the younger. It is not certain how the two groups are related. The older group descends from a Berthold who was the joint founder, with Hnabi, of Reichenau Abbey in 724. His most famous descendant was Cadolah, Duke of Friuli, who defended the Pannonian plains into Italy from the Avars.

A certain Halaholf founded Marchtal Abbey as a proprietary monastery in the mid-8th century. His descendants gave it to the Abbey of Saint Gall in 776. In modern scholarship, the family is named after Halaholf, although in later generations the family's leading name was Berthold.

The younger branch of the family itself comprises two branches. Empress Richardis descends from Erchanger. Her sister married Berthold I and was the mother of the other branch of the family, which included the famous Erchanger, Duke of Swabia, and his brother Berthold II. The Ahalolfings died out when Berthold III died in 973, though the House of Zähringen may be descended from them.

== Sources ==
- Reuter, Timothy (1991). Germany in the Early Middle Ages 800–1056. New York: Longman.
- Störmer, Wilhelm (1980). "Alaholfinger". Lexikon des Mittelalters, I: Aachen bis Bettelordenskirchen (in German). Stuttgart and Weimar: J. B. Metzler. col. 263. ISBN 3-7608-8901-8.
