= Eberhard, Duke of Bavaria =

Eberhard was the eldest son and successor of the Luitpolding duke Arnulf of Bavaria (907–937). His dukedom was short, however, for he was banished by King Otto I of Germany in 938.

In 933 or 934, Eberhard, in view of his maternal Unruoching descendance, was offered the Iron Crown of Lombardy by supporters of King Rudolph II of Burgundy in the conflict with rivalling Hugh of Arles. After Rudolph himself had renounced all claims on the Italian throne, the Bavarian duke allied with Bishop Ratherius and marched against Verona, but the campaign failed. In 935, Eberhard was designated by his father as his heir to the duchy. Duke Arnulf reached the consent of King Henry the Fowler and also made the Bavarian nobility pay homage to his son at Reichenhall in July. At about this time, Eberhard married Liutgard.

On his father's death, he succeeded without fanfare, but quickly came into conflict with Henry's son King Otto, who opposed the privileges won by late Duke Arnulf from his father. Such being the privilege to nominate bishops, that leading to Eberhard's rebellion, which did not garner full support of Bavaria, but did cause Eberhard of Franconia to rebel alongside Eberhard. In two campaigns in 938, in spring and fall, Otto defeated Eberhard and banished him. In his place he appointed his loyal uncle Berthold. Eberhard's place of banishment and date of death are unknown. He may have died around 940, or may have fled to Hungary, even assisting the rebels of 953.

Eberhard, Duke of Bavaria Luitpolding Died: c. 940/953?
Preceded by Arnulf	Duke of Bavaria; 937 – 938	Succeeded by Berthold
