= March of Carinthia =

Former frontier district of the Carolingian Empire

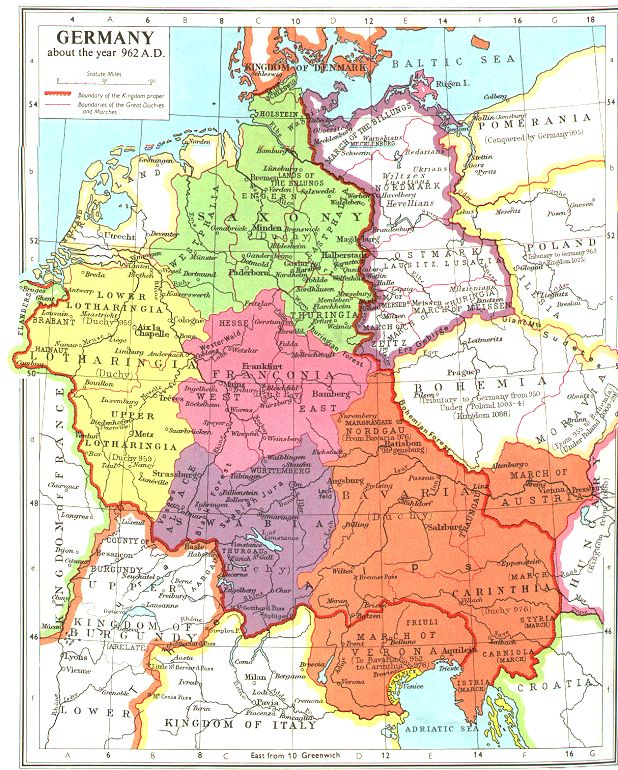
The Eastern Francia (Germany) in 962, with the March of Carinthia as the central portion of the collection of Bavarian marches hatched in orange in the lower right.

The March of Carinthia (Markgrafschaft Karantanien) was a frontier district (march, or margraviate) of the Carolingian Empire. It was created in 889, by king Arnulf of East Francia, encompassing the region of Carantania. Before it became a march, it was organized as a county, since 828 under the Bavarian jurisdiction. In 976, the march of Carinthia was raised into a duchy, the Duchy of Carinthia.

In the meantime, a new Carinthian "transalpine" march (that is, a march beyond the mountains, defending the Carinthia proper) was created in eastern regions, on the river Mur (thus also known as the march on the Mur), and that new province was later transformed into the March of Styria.

== Background ==
Sometime before 743, an independent Slavic principality Carantania was faced with growth of the Avar threat, and thus allied with the Duchy of Bavaria, a vassal of the Frankish Kingdom. With this, the Bavarian and Frankish influence was extended, and imposed more directly by crushing the 772 rebellion of Carantanian Slavs. In the meantime, the Christianisation of local Slavic tribes was initiated, through the Archdiocese of Salzburg, and the Carantanian principality continued to exist as a vassal state of the rising Frankish Empire, being from the time of Charlemagne (d. 814) placed under the jurisdiction of the Duchy of Friuli.

Between 819 and 823, the native Slavic population of Carantania supported prince Ljudevit of Lower Pannonia in revolt against Frankish overlordship. In 827, the Bulgars attacked Carantania and, in 828, emperor Louis the Pious reorganized the Duchy of Friuli into four counties, the two northernmost of which — Carantania and Lower Pannonia — were detached from the Italian kingdom and placed under jurisdiction of the March of Pannonia, within the Bavarian realm of Louis the German. From that time, Carantanians were no longer ruled by native dukes, but by appointed counts. The new county administration was mixed, both Franco-Bavarian and Slavic.

== Carloman and Arnulf ==
In 855, Radbod, Prefect of the Ostmark was deposed for unfaithfulness and Rastislav of Moravia rebelled against East Frankish suzerainty. In place of Radbod, Louis appointed his eldest son Carloman (856). Carloman took control of the other eastern marches, Carinthia and Pannonia, and in 858 campaigned heavily against Rastislav, forcing him to come to terms. In 861, Pabo, margrave of Carinthia, rebelled with his counts and Carloman replaced him with Gundachar. In 863, Louis, fearing a filial rebellion, invaded Carinthia, Carloman's home base. Gundachar went over to the king with a large army he had been given to command the defence of the Schwarza. Consequently, Carloman was captured and deprived of his prefecture, which was bestowed on Gundachar.

When Carloman reconciled with his father and was created King of Bavaria, he granted Carinthia to his son by a Carinthian concubine, Arnulf. Arnulf kept his seat at Moosburg (Mosapurc) and the Carinthians treated him as their native duke. After Carloman was incapacitated by a stroke in 879, Louis the Younger inherited Bavaria and confirmed Arnulf in Carinthia by an agreement with Carloman. Bavaria, however, was ruled more or less by Arnulf. Arnulf had ruled Bavaria during the summer and autumn of 879 while his father arranged his succession and he himself was granted "Pannonia," in the words of the Annales Fuldenses, or "Carantanum," in the words of Regino of Prüm.

== March ==
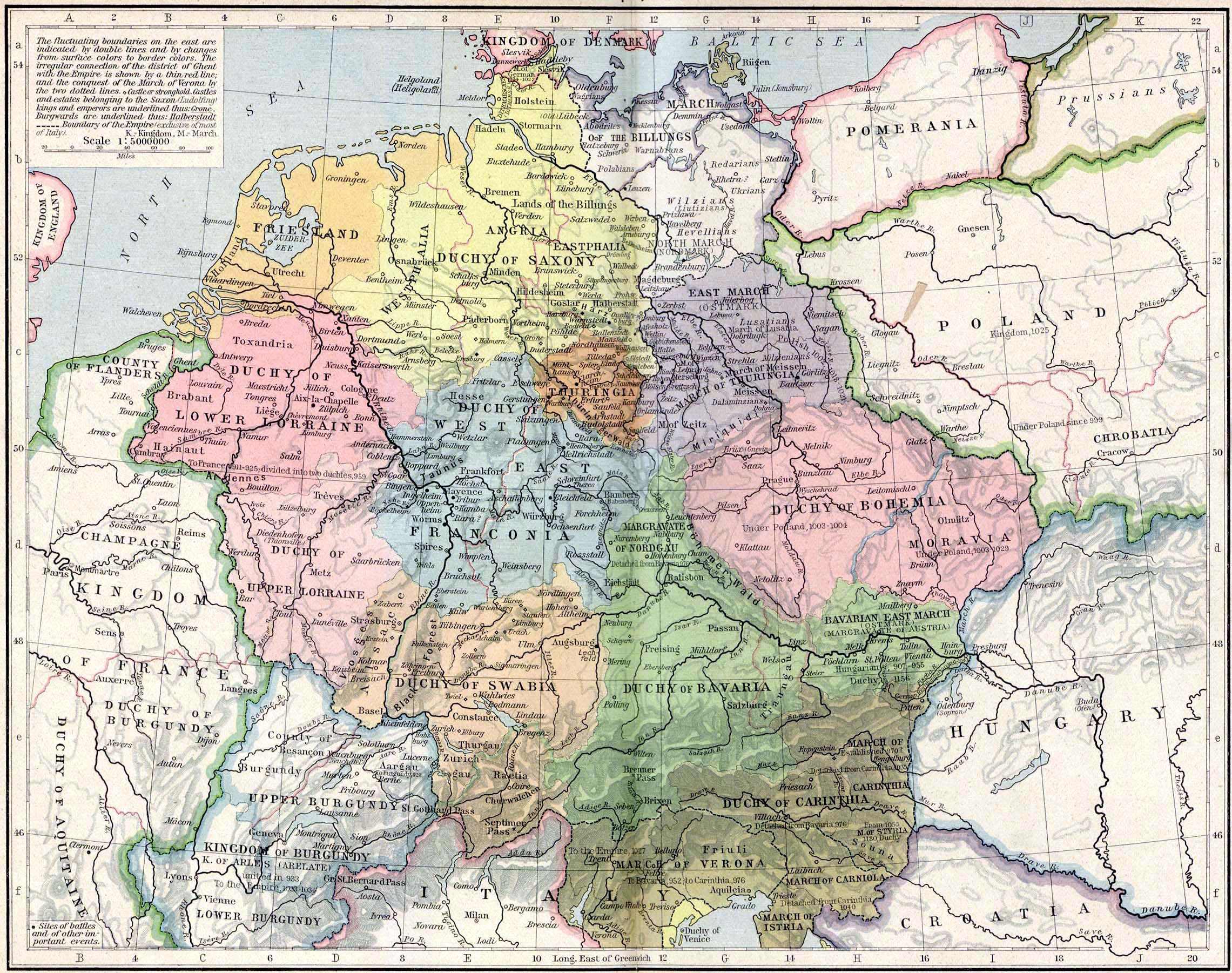
Holy Roman Empire about 1000: The succeeding Duchy of Carinthia shown in brown with the marches of Verona, Istria, Carniola and Styria, according to William Robert Shepherd, 1923

After he in turn became King of all East Francia, Arnulf created a march of Carinthia. Alongside it were the marches of Istria, Austria, and Carniola. The southernmost marches, Carinthia and Carniola, were especially susceptible to Magyar raids. In 901, just two years after their first contact with western Europe, Carinthia was ravaged by the Magyars. In 952, Carinthia was placed under the Duchy of Bavaria, as were Carniola, Istria, and Friuli.

The march's major cities were Friesach and Villach. The only known Carinthian margrave from this period — though many counts are known — is Markward III, who was a preses de Carinthia.

In 976, the Emperor Otto II made his nephew Otto I Duke of Bavaria and separated the March of Caranthia and the other marches from the duchy. He made Carinthia a duchy for the Liutpoldinger Henry, who acted as a sort of "chief of the border police," controlling Istria, Friuli, and Carniola.

In the meantime, during the 10th century, eastern regions were detached from the Carinthia proper, and reorganized into a new march, originally called the Carantanian transalpine march (marchia transalpina), but also known as the March on the Mur (Mark an der Mur), in reference to the main river of the region. That newly created province was designated as "Carantanian" because it was detached from the Carinthia proper, and organized as the march [i.e. frontier district] of the Bavarian duchy, and later of the newly formed Carinthian duchy. The Carantanian transalpine march was later to become the Duchy of Styria.

== See also ==
- The Annals of Fulda (AF)

== Sources ==
- Bowlus, Charles R. (1995). Franks, Moravians, and Magyars: The Struggle for the Middle Danube, 788-907. Philadelphia: University of Pennsylvania Press. ISBN 9780812232769.
- Goldberg, Eric J. (2006). Struggle for Empire: Kingship and Conflict under Louis the German, 817-876. Ithaca, NY: Cornell University Press.
- Luthar, Oto, ed. (2008). The Land Between: A History of Slovenia. Frankfurt am Main: Peter Lang.
- McKitterick, Rosamond (1983). The Frankish Kingdoms Under the Carolingians, 751-987. Harlow: Longman.
- MacLean, Simon (2003). Kingship and Politics in the Late Ninth Century: Charles the Fat and the end of the Carolingian Empire. New York: Cambridge University Press.
- McKitterick, Rosamond (1983). The Frankish Kingdoms Under the Carolingians, 751-987. Harlow: Longman.
- Reuter, Timothy, ed. (1992). The Annals of Fulda. Manchester: Manchester University Press.
- Reuter, Timothy (2013) [1991]. Germany in the Early Middle Ages c. 800–1056. London and New York: Routledge.
- Semple, Ellen Churchill (1915). "The Barrier Boundary of the Mediterranean Basin and Its Northern Breaches as Factors in History". Annals of the Association of American Geographers. 5: 27–59. doi:10.1080/00045601509357037. hdl:2027/uc2.ark:/13960/t2c825k1f.
- Schutz, Herbert (2004). The Carolingians in Central Europe, Their History, Arts, and Architecture: A Cultural History of Central Europe, 750-900. Leiden-Boston: Brill.
- Štih, Peter (2010). The Middle Ages between the Eastern Alps and the Northern Adriatic: Select Papers on Slovene Historiography and Medieval History. Leiden-Boston: Brill.
- Wilson, Peter (2016). Heart of Europe: A History of the Holy Roman Empire. Cambridge: Harvard University Press.
