= Giselle (given name) =

- Pronunciation: English: /dʒɪˈzɛl/ jiz-EL; French: [ʒizɛl]
- Gender: Female

Origin
- Origin: Old German
- Meaning: to pledge

Other names
- Related names: Ghislain, Gisela, Gisele, Gisèle

Giselle is a female given name of French origin. It is derived from the Germanic word geisil, "pledge". Variants include Ghislain, Ghislaine, Gisela, Gisele, Gisèle, Gizel and Gizele.

Notable people with the name include:

- Giselle (singer) (born 2000), Japanese singer and member of the South Korean girl group Aespa
- Giselle of Bavaria (985–1065), Queen of Hungary
- Giselle Ansley (born 1992), British field hockey player
- Giselle Bellas, Cuban-American singer-songwriter
- Giselle Blondet (born 1964), Puerto Rican actress and television host
- Giselle Bonilla (born 1994), American actress
- Giselle Byrnes, New Zealand historian
- Giselle Corbie-Smith, American physician and health equity researcher
- Giselle Fernández (born 1961), American journalist
- Giselle Itié (born 1982), Brazilian actress
- Giselle Juárez (field hockey) (born 1991), Argentine field hockey player
- Giselle Juarez (softball) (born 1998), American softball player
- Giselle Kañevsky (born 1985), Argentine field hockey player
- Giselle Khoury (born 1961), Lebanese journalist
- Giselle Laronde (born 1963), Trinidadian model and 1986 Miss World
- Giselle Lazzarato (born 1992), Canadian internet personality known professionally as Gigi Gorgeous
- Giselle Loren (born 1964), American actress
- Giselle Martin-Kniep (1956–2021), American educator
- Giselle Monteiro (politician) (born 1984), Brazilian politician
- Giselle Patrón (born 1987), Peruvian model
- Giselle Pereira de Vasconcellos (born 1983), Brazilian women's international footballer
- Giselle Rosselli (born 1990), Australian musician
- Giselle Salandy (1987–2009), Trinidadian boxer
- Giselle Soler, Argentinian artistic roller skater
- Giselle Tavera (born 1993), Dominican-American singer
- Giselle Toengi (born 1978), Filipina actress
- Giselle Zado Wasfie (born 1976), American writer
- Giselle Zarur (born 1987), Mexican sports journalist and television reporter

== Fictional characters ==
- Giselle, in the 2007 Disney film Enchanted
- Giselle, in the Open Season films
- Giselle Villard, in Mystic comics
- Giselle, in the 2003 film Mona Lisa Smile
- Giselle, a 1976 Lancia Scorpion that the titular protagonist falls in love with in Herbie Goes to Monte Carlo
- Gisele Yashar, in The Fast and the Furious franchise
- Giselle, one of the main characters of The House in Fata Morgana
- Giselle, title character in the ballet Giselle
- Giselle Gewelle, a Quincy and a member of the Wandenreich's Sternritter with the designation "Z"—"The Zombie"—in Bleach (manga)
- Giselle Marie Tanyag, a character in the Philippine drama series Abot-Kamay na Pangarap
- Giselle Bellamy, a character from The Next Step and Lost & Found Music Studios. She is the former dance captain.

== See also ==
- Giselle (disambiguation)
- Gisella
- Gisela (name)
- Gisele (given name)
