= Gisela (name) =

Gicela or Gisela
- Gender: Female

Origin
- Origin: Germanic
- Meaning: pledge

Other names
- Related names: Giselle, Gísli, Gisle

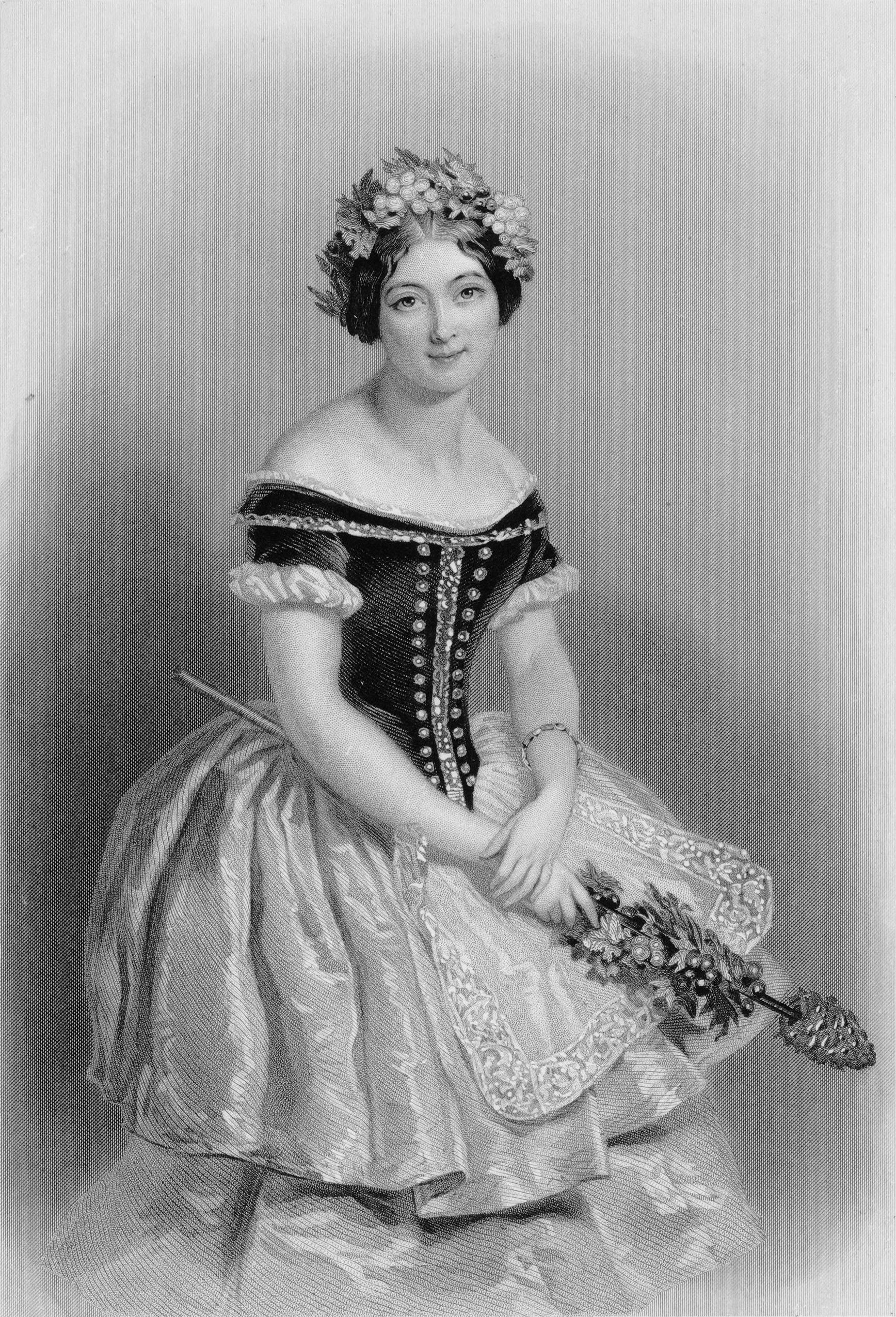
Portrait of Carlotta Grisi in the title role of Giselle, c. 1842

Gisela is a female given name of Germanic origin. The name derives from the Old High German word gīsal, "pledge".

Variations on the name in other languages include:

- Spanish: Gisela, Gicela, Gicelberta
- Catalan: Gisela
- German: Gisela
- French: Gisèle, Giselle
- Hungarian: Gizella
- Italian: Gisella
- Polish: Gizela
- Portuguese: Gisela

The male forms is Gísli and Gisle, from Gísla saga (Gisli's saga) possibly known from place names such as Gislaved, a municipality in Sweden.

== Noble Giselas ==
- Gisela (daughter of Pepin the Short) (757 - 810-11), abbess
- Gisela, daughter of Charlemagne (in or before 781 - after 808)
- Gisela of Burgundy (c. 955 - 1007), daughter of Conrad, king of Burgundy, wife of Henry the Wrangler
- Giselle of Bavaria (c. 1085 - 1065), her daughter (also Gisela of Hungary), wife of Stephen I of Hungary
- Gisela of Swabia (c. 990-1043), Holy Roman Empress, wife of Conrad II, Holy Roman Emperor
- Gisela Agnes of Rath (1669-1740), Duchess of Anhalt-Köthen, Countess of Nienburg, regent of Anhalt-Köthen
- Archduchess Gisela of Austria (1856-1932), daughter to Emperor Franz Joseph I
- Princess Gisela of Liechtenstein (born 1990), great-granddaughter of Emperor Charles I of Austria

== Notable Giselas ==
- Gisela (singer) (born 1979), Catalan singer
- Gisela Arendt (1918–1969), German swimmer
- Gisela Biedermann (born 1948), Liechtensteiner physician and politician
- Gisela Bleibtreu-Ehrenberg (1929–2025), German sociologist, ethnologist, sexologist and writer
- Gisela Boniel (1977–2017), Filipino politician
- Gisela Casimiro (born 1984), Portuguese writer and activist
- Gisela Depkat (born 1942), Canadian cellist and teacher
- Gisela Dulko (born 1985), Argentine tennis player
- Gisela Grothaus (born 1955), German slalom canoeist
- Gísela López (born 1968), Bolivian journalist and politician
- Gisela McDaniel (born 1995), Indigenous Chamorro visual artist
- Gisela Richter (1882–1972), British-born archaeologist
- Gisela Steineckert (born 1931), German writer
- Gisela Storz, American microbiologist
- Gisela Stuart (born 1955), German-born British politician
- Gisela Valcárcel (born 1963), Peruvian TV host
- Gisela Vidal (1940–2022), Venezuelan athlete
- Gisela Wuchinger (born 1950), German Austrian singer, also known as Gilla

== See also ==
- Gisela (disambiguation)
- Gisella (name)
- Giselle (given name)
- Gisele (given name)
