= Gisele (given name) =

- Pronunciation: English: /dʒɪˈzɛl/ jiz-EL; French: [ʒizɛl]
- Gender: Female

Origin
- Origin: Old German
- Meaning: "pledge"

Other names
- Related names: Gisela, Giselle

Gisele or Gisèle is a given name. The name is from Old German gesel meaning to "pledge" and variant of Giselle, Gisela etc.

Notable people with the name include:

== Gisele ==
- Gisele Ben-Dor (born 1955), American Israeli orchestra conductor of Uruguayan origin
- Gisele Bennett, American Professor of Electrical Engineering
- Gisele Bomentre, Brazilian belly dancer and Brazilian Arabic singer
- Gisele Bündchen (born 1980), Brazilian supermodel
- Gisele Barreto Fetterman, Brazilian-American activist
- Gisele Jackson, American house music diva
- Gisele MacKenzie (1927–2003), Canadian singer
- Gisele Marvin (born 1987), American ice hockey player
- Gisele Miró (born 1968), Brazilian tennis player
- Gisele de Oliveira (born 1980), Brazilian triple jumper

== Gisèle ==
- Gisèle Barreau (born 1948), French composer
- Gisèle Biémouret (born 1952), French politician and member of the National Assembly of France
- Gisèle Bienne (born 1946), French writer and novelist
- Gisèle Caille, French racing cyclist
- Gisèle Casadesus (1914–2017), French actress
- Gisèle d'Estoc (1845–1894), French writer, sculptor, feminist
- Gisèle Freund (1908–2000), German-born French photographer
- Gisèle Gautier (born 1938), French politician and a member of the Senate of France
- Gisèle Grandpré (1912–2002), French actress
- Gisèle Halimi (1927–2020), French-Tunisian lawyer, feminist activist and essayist
- Gisèle Lagacé (born 1970), Canadian webcomic creator
- Gisèle Lalonde (1933–2022), mayor of the city of Vanier from 1985 to 1991
- Gisèle Lamoureux, Canadian photographer, botanist and ecologist from Quebec
- Gisèle Lestrange (1927–1991), French graphic artist
- Gisèle Mendy (born 1979), Senegalese judoka
- Gisèle Meygret (1963–1999), French fencer
- Gisèle Moreau (born 1941), French politician
- Gisèle Ory (born 1956), Swiss politician from the Canton of Neuchâtel
- Gisèle Pascal (1921–2007), French actress and a former lover of Rainier III, Prince of Monaco
- Gisèle Pelicot (born 1952), French victim of Mazan mass rape case
- Gisèle Pineau (born 1956), French novelist, writer and former psychiatric nurse
- Gisèle Prassinos (1920–2015), French writer of Greek heritage, associated with the surrealist movement
- Gisèle Printz (born 1933), French politician and member of the Senate of France
- Gisèle Sapiro (born 1965), French sociologist and historian
- Gisèle Wibaut (1913–1978), Belgian resistance fighter and politician
- Gisèle Wulfsohn (1957–2011), South African photographer

== See also ==
- Gisele (disambiguation)
- Gisela (name)
- Gisella (name)
- Giselle (given name)
