= Princess Gisela =

Princess Gisela could refer to:

- Archduchess Gisela of Austria (1856–1932), Austrian royal
- Gisela of Burgundy (c.955–1007), Duchess of Bavaria
- Gisela (daughter of Charlemagne) (c.781–c.808), Frankish royal
- Gisela, daughter of Louis the Pious (born 820), Frankish royal
- Gisela of France, Frankish royal
- Gisela of Hungary (c.985–1065), Queen of Hungary
- Princess Gisela of Liechtenstein (born 1990), Liechtensteiner royal
- Gisela of Swabia (c.990–1043), Holy Roman empress
