= Gisela =

Gisela may refer to:

== People ==
- Gisela (name)

=== Full name ===
- Gisela, Abbess of Chelles (757–810), daughter of Pepin the Short, sister of Charlemagne
  - Gisela, daughter of Charlemagne (781–808)
- Gisela, daughter of Louis the Pious (born 821), consort of Eberhard of Friuli
- Gisela of France, also Gisella or Giséle (fl. 911), traditionally, a daughter to the king of France, Charles the Simple and a consort of Rollo
- Gisela of Burgundy (c. 975 – 1006), daughter of Conrad, king of Burgundy
  - Gisela of Hungary (c. 985 - 1065), her daughter
- Gisela of Swabia (989 or 990 – 1043), Holy Roman Empress, wife of Conrad II, Holy Roman Emperor
- Archduchess Gisela of Austria (1856–1932), daughter to Emperor Franz Joseph I of Austria and Elisabeth of Bavaria, named after Giselle of Bavaria
- Gisela (singer) (born 1979), Spanish singer
- Princess Gisela of Liechtenstein (born 1990), great-granddaughter of Charles I of Austria

== Other uses ==
- Gisela, Arizona, a US census-designated place
- Gisela (magazine)

== See also ==
- Gisella, a name
- Giselle (disambiguation)
