= Gísli =

- Gender: Male

Origin
- Origin: Germanic
- Meaning: pledge, guarantee, hostage
- Region of origin: Iceland, Faroe Islands

Other names
- Related names: Gisle, Gisela

Gísli (Icelandic pronunciation: [ˈcistlɪ]) is an Icelandic and Faroese masculine given name. Gisle is the Norwegian variant of the name. Notable people with the name include:

- Gisli (contemporary musician), Icelandic musician
- Gísli Marteinn Baldursson (born 1972), Icelandic TV host and politician
- Gísli S. Einarsson (born 1945), Icelandic politician
- Gísli Eyjólfsson (born 1994), Icelandic footballer
- Gísli Guðjónsson (born 1947), Icelandic scientist
- Gísli Halldórsson (1927–1998), Icelandic actor
- Gísli Örn Garðarsson (born 1973), Icelandic actor and director
- Gísli Jónsson (1889–1970), Icelandic politician
- Gísli Rúnar Jónsson (1953–2020), Icelandic actor
- Gísli Konráðsson (1787–1877), Icelandic farmer, folklorist and historian
- Gísli Þorgeir Kristjánsson (born 1999), Icelandic handball player
- Gísli Magnússon (1929–2001), Icelandic pianist
- Gísli Pálsson (born 1949), Icelandic anthropologist and author
- Gisli Sursson, the protagonist of the Gísla saga
- Gísli Torfason (1954–2005), Icelandic football defender and goalkeeper
- Gísli Þórðarson (born 2004), Icelandic footballer
- Gísli Þorláksson, 17th Century Icelandic bishop
- Gísli Þorsteinsson (born 1952), Icelandic judoka
