= Ghislain =

Masculine Ghislain, Guislain (/ɡi.lɛ̃/), Gislain or Ghiselin and feminine Ghislaine or Ghyslaine (hard G and silent S: /ɡi.lɛn/) is a French personal name used in countries with French-speaking populations. It originated with a 7th century saint, Saint Ghislain (died 680) of Hainaut and was Latinized as Gislenus.

Etymologically, the name is usually said to derive from the oblique case of a Proto-West Germanic root: *gīsl “hostage, pledge” (see Wiktionary:Ghislain). As such, it is cognate with modern German Geisel "hostage". (However, one source has instead claimed that the name is derived from Germanic roots gis "information" and lind "sweet".) The name possibly became popular as a secondary given name, which was intended to give infants the protection of St Ghislain.

Variants include Gisela, Gisele, Gisèle, Gizel and Gizele.

Other people with this given name include:

== Ghislain ==
- Ghislain Anselmini (born 1970), French footballer
- Ghislain Barbe, Canadian illustrator
- Ghislain Cloquet (1924–1981), Belgian-born French cinematographer
- Ghislain Fournier (born 1938), Canadian politician and businessman
- Ghislain Gimbert (born 1985), French footballer
- Ghislain Harvey (born 1946), Canadian politician
- Ghislain Lebel (1946–2023), Canadian politician
- Ghislain Lemaire (born 1972), French judoka
- Ghislain de Montgolfier (born 1943), French winemaker, head of the Bollinger Champagne house
- Ghislain Poirier, artist name Poirier (born 1976), Canadian DJ from Montreal

== Ghislaine ==
- Ghislaine Alexander (1922–2000), British heiress and socialite
- Ghislaine Arabian (born 1948), French chef
- Ghislaine Barnay (born 1945), French athlete
- Ghislaine Crozaz (born 1939), Belgian geochemist
- Ghislaine Dehaene-Lambertz (born 1959), French pediatrician and neuroscientist
- Ghislaine Dommanget (1900–1991), Princess of Monaco and actress
- Ghislaine Dupont (1956-2013), French journalist
- Ghislaine Howard (born 1953), British figurative artist
- Ghislaine Landry (born 1988), Canadian rugby union player
- Ghislaine Leung (born 1980), British artist
- Ghislaine Maxwell (born 1961), British socialite, daughter of Robert Maxwell, companion of Jeffrey Epstein and convicted sex criminal
  - Lady Ghislaine, yacht named after Maxwell
- Gigi Perreau (born 1941), American film and television actress.
- Ghislaine Roquet (1926–2016), Canadian philosophy professor and nun
- Ghislaine Thesmar (born 1943), French ballet dancer

== Gislaine ==
- Gislaine (born 1988), Brazilian footballer

== Ghyslain ==
- Ghyslaine Côté (born 1955), Canadian filmmaker
- Ghyslain Raza (born circa 1988), creator of the viral video Star Wars Kid

== Ghiselin ==
- Ogier Ghiselin de Busbecq (1522–29 October 1592), author of the Turkish Letters, who introduced the tulip to Europe

== See also ==
- 7112 Ghislaine (1986 GV), a main-belt asteroid
