= Gisella =

Gisella is an Italian variant of the feminine given name Gisela. Notable people with the name include:

- Gisella Anastasia (born 1990), Indonesian actress
- Gisella Caccialanza (1914–1998), American prima ballerina
- Gisella Delle Grazie (1868–death date unknown), Italian composer
- Gisella Floreanini (1906–1993), Italian politician
- Gisella Giovenco (born 1946), Italian painter
- Gisella Grosz (1875–1942), Hungarian classical pianist
- Gisella Loeffler (1902–1977), Austro-Hungarian–American painter
- Gisella Marengo (born 1975), Italian actress and producer
- Gisella Neu (1908–1989), Austro-Hungarian-American violinist
- Gisella Orsini (born 1971), Swiss writer and racewalker
- Gisella Perl (1907–1988), Hungarian Jewish gynecologist and author
- Gisella Sofio (1931–2017), Italian actress

== See also ==
- Gisela (disambiguation)
- Gisela (name)
- Gisele (given name)
- Giselle (given name)
