= Montgolfier (surname) =

Montgolfier is a surname. Notable people with the surname include:

- Albéric de Montgolfier (born 1964), member of the Senate of France
- Éric de Montgolfier (born 1946), French attorney and state prosecutor
- Ghislain de Montgolfier (born 1943), French winemaker, head of the Bollinger Champagne house
- Jacques-Étienne Montgolfier (1745-1799), French paper manufacturer and balloonist
- Joseph-Michel Montgolfier (1740-1810), French paper manufacturer and balloonist
- Paul de Montgolfier (1913-1942), French pilot
- Pierre de Montgolfier-Verpilleux (1831-1913), French engineer
