= Giselle (disambiguation) =

Giselle is a ballet.

Giselle, Gisele, Gisèle, Gisselle, may also refer to:

== People ==
- Giselle (given name), a given name and list of people with the name
- Gisele (given name) and "Gisèle", a given name and list of people with the name
- Giselle (singer) (b. 2000), member of Aespa
- Giselle Rosselli (b. 1990), Australian singer-songwriter known as "Giselle"
- Gisselle (born 1969), Puerto Rican singer

== Arts, entertainment, media ==
- Giselle (film), a film based on the ballet

== Other uses ==
- Storm Gisele, a 2018 European storm

== See also ==
- Giselli Monteiro, Brazilian model and actress
- Gisella (name)
- Gisela (disambiguation)
