= Uta Codex =

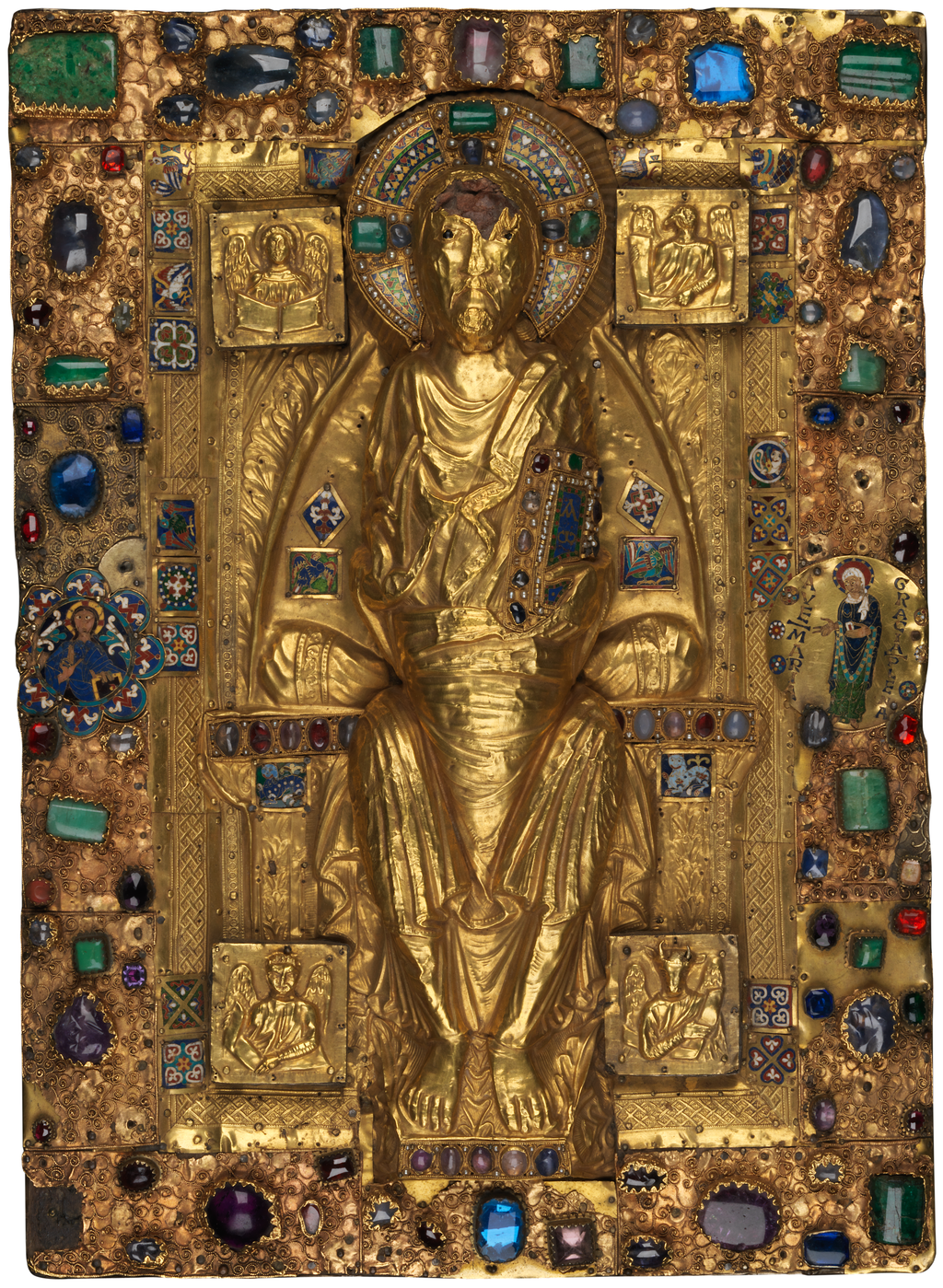
Cover of the Uta Codex

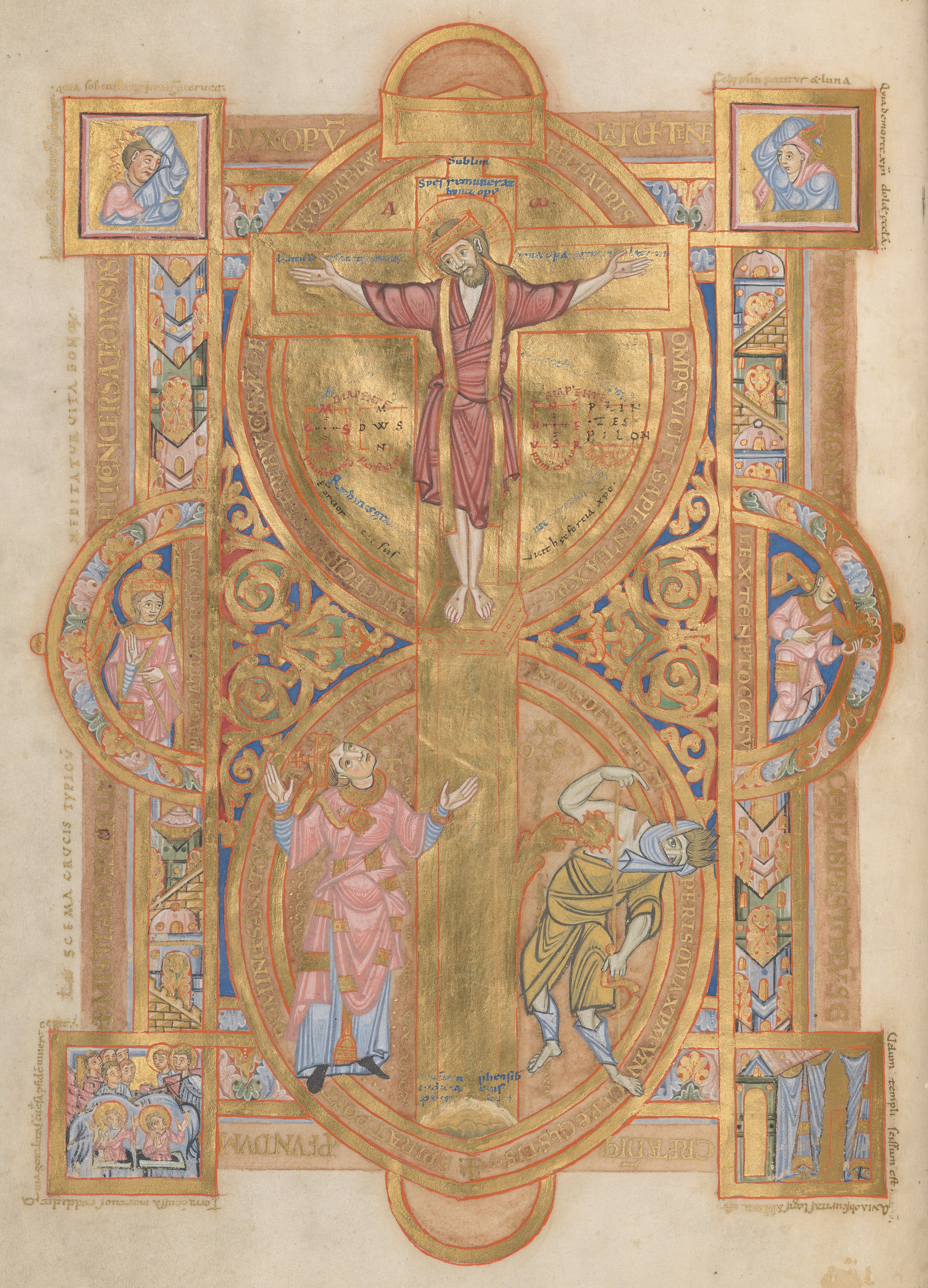
Symbolic crucifixion, from the Uta Codex

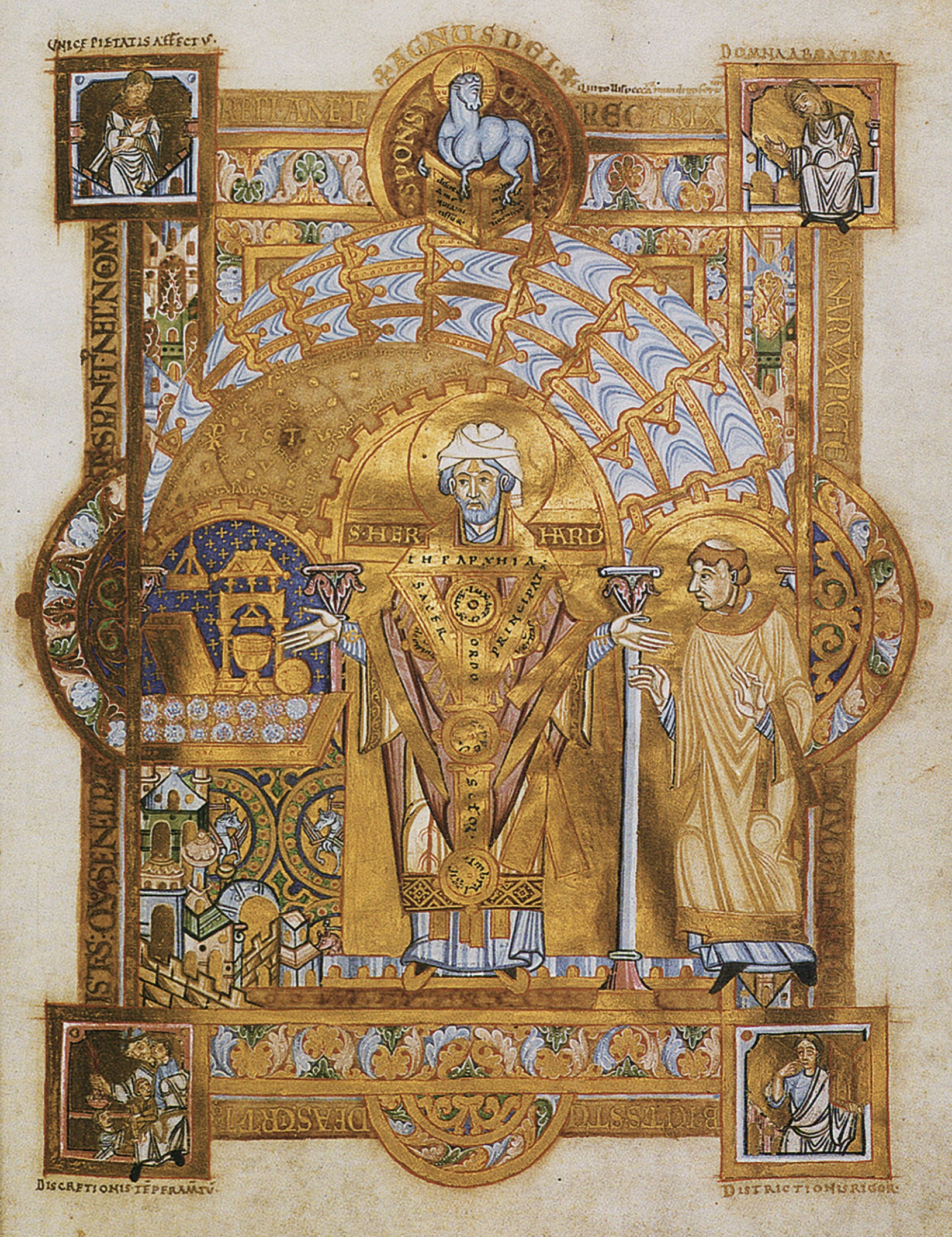
Erhard of Regensburg reads the mass, from the Uta Codex

The Uta Codex (Clm. 13601, Bavarian State Library, Munich) is a "gospel lectionary" or evangeliary. It contains those portions of the gospels which are read during church services. "Unlike most Gospel lectionaries, the individual readings in the Uta Codex are not arranged in calendrical order, but are instead grouped together after their respective Gospel authors." It was commissioned around 1025 by Abbess Uta of Niedermünster, Regensburg, in Bavaria, Germany, and produced in the scriptorium of Saint Emmeram's Abbey. It is a spectacular Ottonian manuscript, and is famous for its gem-encrusted gold case, with a relief of Christ in Majesty, as well as for the eight full-page miniatures. German art historian George Swarzenski described the Uta Codex as "the wonderful gospel book, which is perhaps the most significant work of Western illumination of its time." The manuscript consists of 119 parchment sheets, 382 × 274 mm. Four full-page frontispieces illustrate 1) the Hand of God, 2) Abbess Uta dedicating the codex to the Virgin and Child, 3) the Crucifixion, and 4) Saint Erhard, patron saint of the convent, celebrating Mass. A portrait of each the four Evangelists accompanies the readings from their Gospel.

== Bibliography ==
- Cohen, Adam S. The Uta Codex: Art, Philosophy, and Reform in Eleventh-Century Germany, Penn State Press, 2000.
- Swarzenski, Georg. Die Regensburger Buchmalerei des X. und XI. Jahrhunderts, Verlag von Karl W. Hiersemann, 1901. (https://archive.org/details/dieregensburgerb00swar)
