= Bienne (disambiguation) =

Biel/Bienne is a city in the canton of Berne, Switzerland.

Bienne may also refer to:

- Bienne (surname)
- Bienne (river), a river in France
- Bienne-lez-Happart, a village in Hainault, Belgium

== See also ==
- Brienne (disambiguation)
