= Gíslason =

Gíslason is an Icelandic patronymic, meaning son of Gísli. In Icelandic names, it is not strictly a surname because it is not a family name, but refers to the person's father. Notable people with this name include:

- Alfreð Gíslason (b. 1959), Icelandic handball player and coach
- Gabriel Bier Gislason (b. 1989), Danish film director
- Gunnar Gíslason (b. 1961), Icelandic professional football player
- Gunnar Gíslason (contemporary), Icelandic businessman
- Gylfi Þorsteinsson Gíslason (1917–2004), Icelandic politician; member of the Alþing; government minister
- John B. Gislason (1872-1960), American farmer and politician
- Leif Gislason (b. 1983), Canadian ice dancer
- Páll Gíslason, Icelandic physician
- Rúrik Gíslason (b. 1988), Icelandic professional football player
- Sigurgeir Gíslason (1925-2003), Icelandic chess player
- Stefán Gíslason (b. 1980), Icelandic professional football player
- Ýmir Örn Gíslason (b. 1997), Icelandic professional handball player

== See also ==
- Gísladóttir
