= Brienne (disambiguation) =

Brienne may refer to:

== Places ==
- Brienne, Saône-et-Loire, a commune in the Saône-et-Loire department in eastern France
- Brienne-la-Vieille, a commune in the Aube department in north-central France
- Brienne-le-Château, a commune in the Aube department in north-central France
  - Canton of Brienne-le-Château, a modern administrative division based on Brienne-le-Château
  - County of Brienne, a medieval fiefdom based on Brienne-le-Château
- Brienne-sur-Aisne, a commune in the Ardennes department in northern France

== People with the name ==
- John of Brienne (c. 1170–1237), King of Jerusalem and later Latin Emperor of Constantinople

=== Given name ===
- Brienne Minor (born 1997), an American tennis player
- Brienne Pedigo, an American auto racing pit reporter
- Brienne Stairs (born 1989), a Canadian women's field hockey player

=== Surname ===
- Étienne Charles de Loménie de Brienne (1727–1794), a French clergyman and statesman
- Louis de Brienne de Conflans d'Armentières (1711–1774), a French general
- Matteo de Brienne (born 2002), Canadian soccer player

== Fiction ==
- Brienne of Tarth, a fictional character in George R. R. Martin's A Song of Ice and Fire series of fantasy novels

== See also ==
- Bienne (disambiguation)
