= Bienne (surname) =

Bienne is a surname. Notable people with the surname include:

- Eugene Biel-Bienne (1902–1969), Austrian-American painter
- Gisèle Bienne (born 1946), French writer
