= Gísladóttir =

Gísladóttir is an Icelandic patronymic, meaning daughter of Gísli. In Icelandic names, it is not strictly a surname because it is not a family name, but a patronymic. Notable people with this name include:

- Ingibjörg Sólrún Gísladóttir (b. 1954), Icelandic politician; mayor of Reykjavík 1994-2003; foreign minister of Iceland since 2007
- Ragnhildur Gísladóttir, Icelandic pop singer
- Sigurlaug Gísladóttir (b. 1984), Icelandic singer and songwriter

See also

- Gíslason
