= Bruno of Augsburg =

Bishop of Augsburg from 1006 to 1029

- Bishop of Augsburg
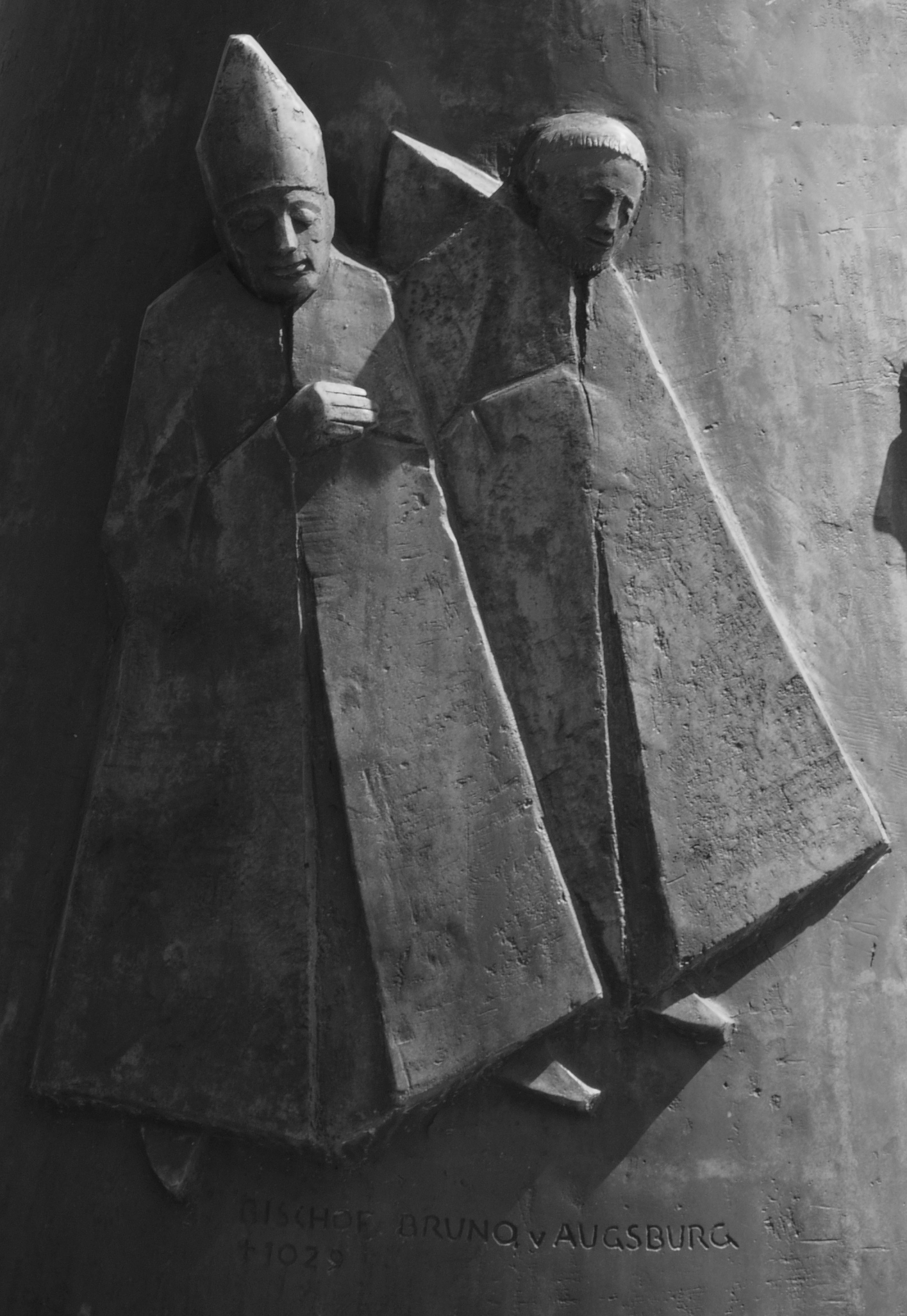
- Diocese: Augsburg
- In office: 1006 – 1029
- Predecessor: Siegfried I of Augsburg
- Successor: Eberhard I of Augsburg

Personal details
- Born: c. 992
- Died: 1029 Regensburg
- Buried: Church of Saint Maurice, Augsburg
- Denomination: Roman Catholic

Bruno of Augsburg (or Brun) von Bayern (c. 992 – 1029) was the son of Henry II, Duke of Bavaria (the Wrangler or Quarrelsome) and Gisela of Burgundy. He was the younger brother of Henry II, Holy Roman Emperor of Germany, the only Holy Roman Emperor to be made a saint. He and his brother were tutored by Wolfgang of Regensburg.

Bruno later became a canon of Hildesheim. In 1003, Bruno supported the revolt of Henry of Schweinfurt, Margrave of the Nordgau against his brother. When the revolt failed, Bruno fled to Bohemia and then stayed for a time at the court of his brother-in-law, King Stephen I of Hungary. He was reconciled to his brother in early 1004, through the efforts of Stephen I of Hungary.

Bruno served as chancellor for a year before being elected Bishop of Augsburg in 1006, a post he held until 1029. As a bishop, he encouraged King Stephen I of Hungary's efforts to convert rebellious pagans to the new faith.

The diocese of Augsburg attained great splendour under Bishop Bruno (1006–1029); he restored a number of ruined monasteries, founded the church and college of St. Maurice, placed Benedictine monks in the collegiate church of St. Afra, and added to the episcopal possessions by the gift of his own inheritance of Straubing.

Bruno was exiled in 1024, possibly over a disagreement with Henry I over the founding of the Diocese of Bamberg. Bruno later became an important adviser to Emperor Conrad II. In 1026, Bruno was named regent in Germany during Conrad's expedition in Italy. That same year Henry V, Duke of Bavaria, brother of Henry II's wife Cunigunde of Luxembourg, died without issue. Bruno was the closest related heir, but as an ecclesiastic could not claim the title. Before leaving for Italy, Conrad II named his son Henry III as his heir, and, recognising the Bishop as an experienced statesman, named Bruno Henry's guardian and tutor. During Conrad II's absence, Welf II, Count of Swabia sacked and pillaged the city of Augsburg, seizing the Bishop's treasury. Bruno escaped across the Alps, taking the young Henry with him, and joined Conrad II in Italy. Upon Conrad II's return, Welf II was imprisoned and compelled to make restitution. Conrad II named his son Henry III, Duke of Bavaria. Herwig Wolfram suggests that Bruno's appointment as young Henry III's guardian was in anticipation of this.

Bishop Bruno died in Regensburg in 1029 and was buried in the church of Saint Maurice in Augsburg.

== Notes and references ==
Catholic Church titles
| Preceded by Siegfried I | Bishop of Augsburg; 1006 – 1029 | Succeeded by Eberhard I |
