= Albert of Cashel =

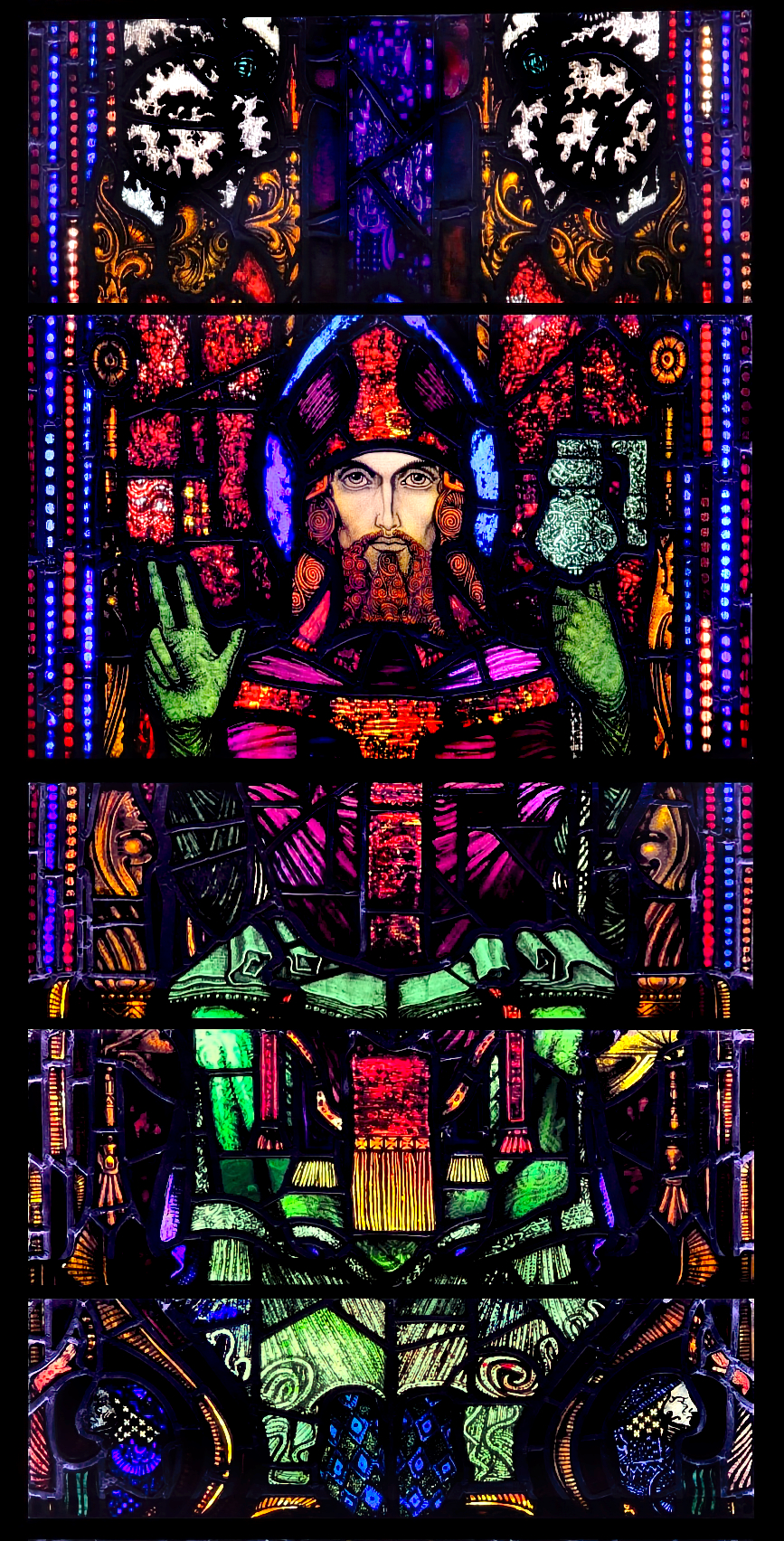
St. Albert by Harry Clarke at the Honan Chapel

Albert of Cashel was an eighth century saint and Patron of Cashel, Ireland.

== Life ==
Traditionally held to be an Englishman who worked in Ireland and then Bavaria, Albert went to Jerusalem and died in Regensburg on his return journey.

He was an evangelist working mainly around the city of Cashel, and may have been a bishop there. In a legendary 12th century biography he is called natione Anglus, conversatione Angelicus - “by race an Angle, in manners an angel". He continued his work as an Evangelist in Bavaria with Saint Erhard of Regensburg and is reported to have suffered from arthritis in his back and hips.

He made a pilgrimage to Jerusalem, with Erhard of Regensburg. He traveled to Jerusalem but died in 800 AD at Regensburg on the return journey. Albert's grave is in Niedermünster in Regensburg and he was canonized 19 June 1902 by Pope Leo XIII.

== Controversy ==
His existence has been questioned by some, others question his role as Archbishop of Cashel, stating that this diocese did not exist until 1118 AD.

== See also ==
- Rock of Cashel
- Archbishop of Cashel
- Cashel, Ireland
- Regensburg
- Scots Monastery, Regensburg

== Literature ==
- Stefan Weber: Die Konstruktion eines fabulösen »irischen« Heiligenlebens? Der heilige Albert, Regensburg und die Iren, in: Irische Mönche in Süddeutschland. Literarisches und kulturelles Wirken der Iren im Mittelalter, ed. D. Walz/J. Kaffanke (Lateinische Literatur im deutschen Südwesten 2), Heidelberg 2009, p. 229-304.
