= Sinking of MS Þormóður =

Naval accident in Iceland

- Date: 17 February 1943
- Location: Garðskagi, Reykjanes, Iceland
- Cause: Storm
- Deaths: 31

The sinking of MS Þormóður (Icelandic: Þormóðsslysið) occurred on 17 February 1943, when the motorboat MS Þormóður sank off the coast of Garðskagi in Reykjanes, Iceland during a storm. The vessel was en route from Patreksfjörður to Reykjavík, resulting in the loss of 31 lives. This tragic incident caused an uproar in Iceland regarding the safety on the sea.

== Ship ==
MS Þormóður was built in 1931 as a motorized fishing ship. It was owned by Gísli Jónsson, a member of Alþingi, and was leased to the State Shipping Company (Icelandic: Skipaútgerð Ríkisins) as a passenger and cargo ship at the time of the sinking.

== Passengers and crew ==
Of 24 passengers and 7 crewmembers, there were no survivors. One body was found during rescue operations and eight later washed ashore the following months.
