= Niedermünster, Regensburg =

Religious community

Coordinates: 49°1′10″N 12°6′2″E

Imperial Abbey of Niedermünster Reichsstift Niedermünster
- 1002–1803
- Status: Imperial Abbey
- Capital: Niedermünster Abbey
- Historical era: Middle Ages
  - First religious community founded: 788
  - Granted Reichsfreiheit: 1002
  - Secularised to Bavaria: 1803
Preceded by	Succeeded by
Duchy of Bavaria	Principality of Regensburg
- Today part of: Germany

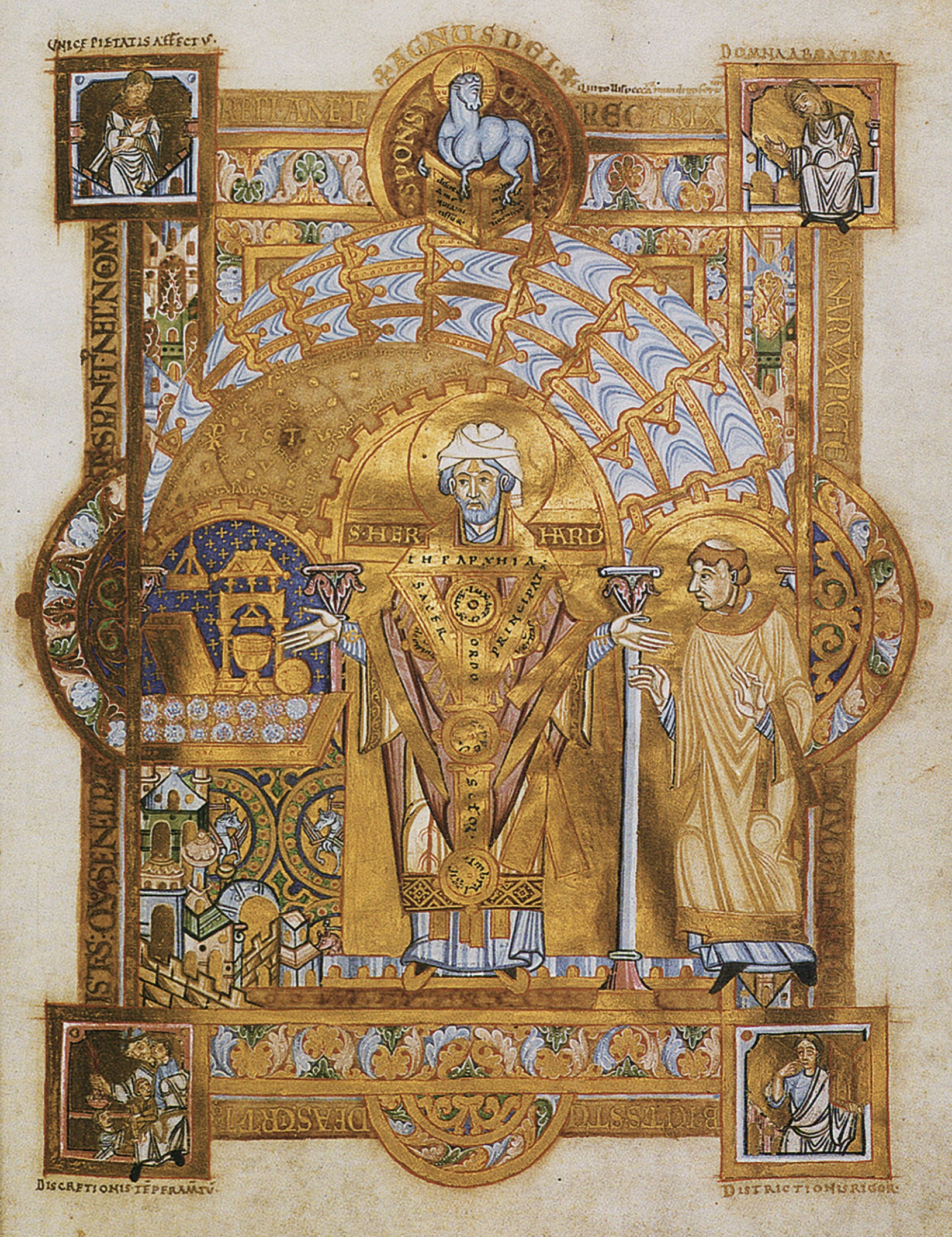
Saint Erhard, traditional founder of Niedermünster, from the Uta Codex, early 11th century, commissioned by Abbess Uta or Uda I

The Niedermünster or Niedermünster Abbey (German: Reichsstift Niedermünster), Regensburg, was a house of canonesses (Frauenstift) in Regensburg, Bavaria, Germany. At the height of its power it was one of the wealthiest and most influential in Bavaria. The church is still in use as the parish church of Regensburg Cathedral.

== History ==

This women's religious community, dedicated to Saint Erhard of Regensburg at its founding and later to the Assumption of the Virgin Mary as well, was recorded for the first time in about 889. However, the first church, if the traditional foundation by the seventh-century Saint Erhard is credited, would have already existed by about 700, and a religious community had been founded by 788 by Tassilo III, Duke of Bavaria. The foundation tradition also credits Saint Erhard with the foundation of a nunnery here. It is not clear in fact whether at first the community was for men or for women, but it soon developed into one of the most important women's religious houses in Germany.

The church was entirely rebuilt on a grand scale by Henry I, Duke of Bavaria, in about 950. Henry was buried here and his widow Judith, who by virtue of her and her husband's generous endowment of the community, is counted as the founder, took the veil here, became abbess and was herself buried here in 990.

This close connection with the ruling and Imperial Ottonian house made Niedermünster powerful and wealthy. The treasures of Niedermünster include the Rule of about 990 and the Uta Codex or Evangeliary of about 1025 with its casket of chased gold, commissioned by an abbess of Niedermünster and containing an illumination showing Saint Erhard presiding at Mass. There is also the magnificent cross given by Queen Gisela, daughter of Henry II, Duke of Bavaria, and wife of King Stephen I of Hungary, for the tomb of her mother, Duchess Gisela of Bavaria, who was buried here in 1006.

In 1002 Emperor Henry II, son of Henry II, Duke of Bavaria, granted the community Reichsfreiheit (territorial and judicial independence of all save the Emperor) and it became an Imperial abbey, or Reichsstift.

Emperor Henry II later favoured his own foundation of Bamberg Cathedral over Niedermünster, which accordingly lost prominence and influence.

The present Romanesque church was constructed after a fire in 1152 destroyed the previous one. The crypt of Saint Erhard remains from earlier buildings, however.

In the 17th and 18th centuries the church was modernised, although very modestly, and fitted out with some important works of art, including a monumental bronze crucifix and a sorrowing Mary Magdalene by Georg Petel. The silver shrine of the relics of Saint Erhard dates from the 19th century.

The community was dissolved in 1803 during the secularisation of Bavaria. From 1820 the premises were partly rented out. In 1821 the Bishop of Regensburg was given rooms here for his residence, and the episcopal offices were also transferred here. Also in 1821 the former canonry church took over from St. Ulrich's the role of cathedral parish church.

During excavations the foundations of Roman military buildings and predecessors of the church were uncovered. These may be seen only on guided tours, but it is planned to make these unique and well-preserved discoveries more accessible to the public.

Burials in Niedermünster include:

- Saint Erhard
- Blessed Albert of Cashel
- Henry I, Duke of Bavaria, his wife Judith, Duchess of Bavaria and their daughter-in-law Gisela of Burgundy, wife of Henry II, Duke of Bavaria

== Abbesses of Niedermünster ==
- Wildrade von Lernberg 900-928
- Tutta I von Reidenburg 928-942
- Himetrade von Hohenburg 942 – before 974
- Judith, Duchess of Bavaria 974-990
- Richenza I von Limburg 990-994
- Kunigunde I von Kirchberg 994-1002
- Uda I von Kirchberg 1002-1025
- Heilka I von Rothenburg 1025-1052
- Gertrud I von Hals 1052-1065
- Mathilde I von Luppurg 1065-1070
- Heilka II von Franken 1070-1089
- Uda II von Marburg 1089-1103
- Richenza II von Zolling 1103-1109
- Mathilde II von Kirchberg 1109-1116
- Richenza III von Abensberg 1116-1126
- Richenza IV von Dornburg 1126-1130
- Heilka III von Kirchberg 1130-1136
- Kunigunde II von Kirchberg 1136-1177
- Tutta II von Falkenstein 1177-1180
- Adelheid I von Wolffershausen 1180-1190
- Bertha von Frontenhausen 1190-1197
- Heilka IV von Rotheneck 1197-1218
- Heilka V von Wittelsbach 1218-1224
- Frideruna von Falkenstein 1224-1229
- Mathilde III von Henffenfeld 1229-1239
- Tutta III von Dalmässing 1239-1242
- Irmgard I von Scheyern 1242-1245
- Hildegard von Kirchberg 1245-1249
- Kunigunde III von Stein 1249-1257
- Kühnheit Pinzingerin 1257-1259 ?
- Wilburg von Lobsingen 1259 ?-1261
- Tutta IV von Putingen 1261-1264
- Gertrud II. von Stein 1264-1271
- Wilburg von Lobsingen 1271-1273 (again)
- Elisabeth I Stauffin von Stauffenburg 1273-1276
- Hedwig Kropflin 1276-1285
- Kunigunde IV Hainkhoverin 1285-1300
- Adelheid II von Treidenberg 1300-1304
- Irmgard II von Köfering 1304-1314
- Euphemia von Winzer 1314-1333
- Elisabeth II von Eschen 1333-1340
- Petrissa von Weidenberg 1340-1353
- Margarethe I Gösslin von Altenburg 1353-1361
- Margarethe II Pinzingerin 1361-1365
- Elisabeth III von Rhein 1365-1391
- Sophia von Daching 1391-1410
- Katharina I von Egloffstein 1410-1413
- Barbara I Höfferin 1413-1417
- Herzenleid von Wildenwarth 1417-1422
- Anna I von Streitberg 1422-1427
- Beatrix von Rotheneck 1427
- Osanna von Streitberg 1427-1444
- Ursula von Tauffkirchen-Hohenrain und Höchlenbach 1444-1448
- Ottilia von Abensberg 1448-1475 mit
- Margarethe III von Paulstorff 1469-1475
- Agnes von Rothafft 1475-1520
- Barbara II von Aham 1520-1569
- Anna II von Kirmbreith 1569-1598
- Katharina II Scheifflin 1598-1605
- Eva von Uhrhausen 1605-1616
- Anna Maria von Salis 1616-1652
- Maria Margarethe von Sigertshofen 1652-1675
- Maria Theresia von Muggenthal 1675-1693
- Regina Recordin von Rein und Hamberg 1693-1697
- Johanna Franziska Sibylla von Muggenthal 1697-1723
- Maria Katharina Helena von Aham-Neuhaus 1723-1757
- Anna Katharina von Dücker-Hasslen-Urstein-Winkel 1757-1768
- Anna Febronia Elisabeth von Speth-Zwyfalten 1769-1789
- Maria Franziska Xaveria von Königfeld 1789-1793
- Maria Violanta von Lerchenfeld-Premberg 1793-1801
- Maria Helena von Freien-Seiboltsdorf 1801-1803

== See also ==
- Obermünster, Regensburg

== Sources ==
- (in German) Klöster in Bayern: Niedermünster, Regensburg
- (in German) Episcopal Offices, Regensburg
- (in German) Bibliography of the Nieder-, Ober- and Mittelmünster in Regensburg
