= Gisle =

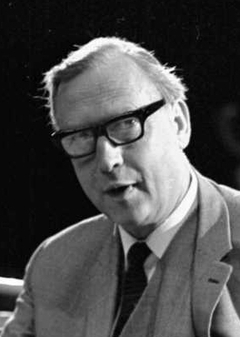
Gisle Straume (1917-1988), Norwegian actor and theatre director

Gisle is a given name. Notable people with the given name include:

- Gisle Ellingsen (born 1965), Norwegian high jumper
- Gisle Elvebakken (born 1970), Norwegian speed skater
- Gisle Fenne (born 1963), Norwegian biathlete
- Gisle Johnson (1822–1894), Norwegian theologian and educator
- Gisle Johnson (Scouting) (1934–2014), Norwegian chief scout
- Gisle Hannemyr (born 1953), Norwegian computer scientist
- Gisle Kverndokk (born 1967), Norwegian contemporary composer
- Gisle Midttun (1881–1940), Norwegian cultural historian and museologist
- Gisle Meininger Saudland (born 1986), Norwegian politician
- Gisle Saga (born 1974), Norwegian music producer and songwriter
- Gisle Straume (1917–1988), Norwegian actor and theatre director
- Gisle Torvik (born 1975), Norwegian jazz musician
