= Giselle Monteiro (politician) =

Brazilian politician (born 1984)

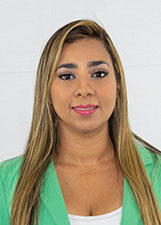
- Monteiro in 2022

Member of the Legislative Assembly of Rio de Janeiro
- Incumbent
- Assumed office 1 February 2023

Personal details
- Born: 13 April 1984 (age 42)
- Party: Liberal Party (since 2022)
- Parent: Roberto Monteiro (father)
- Relatives: Gabriel Monteiro (brother)

Giselle Louise Monteiro de Oliveira (born 13 April 1984) is a Brazilian politician serving as a member of the Legislative Assembly of Rio de Janeiro since 2023. She is the daughter of Roberto Monteiro and the sister of Gabriel Monteiro.
