= Gísli Jónsson =

Icelandic politician (1889–1970)

Gísli Jónsson (17 August 1889 – 7 October 1970) was an Icelandic politician. He served as a member of the Althing from 1942 to 1956 and from 1959 to 1963 as an independent. He served as a member of the Nordic Council from 1952 to 1956 and from 1959 to 1963, was chairman of the Icelandic delegation 1959–1963, president of the council in 1960, and vice president in 1959 and 1961–1963.

Gísli was the owner of the motorboat MS Þormóður, which sinking during a storm in 1943, that led to the death of 31 passengers and crew, caused an uproar in Iceland regarding the safety on the sea.
