= Gisle Saga =

Norwegian music producer and songwriter (born 1974)

- Birth name: Gisle Saga
- Born: May 9, 1974 (age 50)
- Origin: Tønsberg, Norway
- Genres: Hip hop, pop, rock, R&B, urban
- Occupation(s): songwriter, record producer
- Years active: 1992–present
- Labels: Privilege Production
- Website: www.privilegeproduction.com

Gisle Saga is a Norwegian music producer and songwriter.

== Career ==
=== Early work ===
Gisle Saga (born May 9, 1974) had two major hits on the Norwegian chart VG-lista with the band El More. "Everybody" reached no 9 and "Close to you" reached no 2. "Close to you" was the official Norwegian Big Brother theme of the 2002 season.

=== Present ===
Gisle Saga is running the music production company Privilege Production.
