= Henry II of Bavaria =

Duke of Bavaria (955–976, 985–995)

Henry II
- Duke of Bavaria
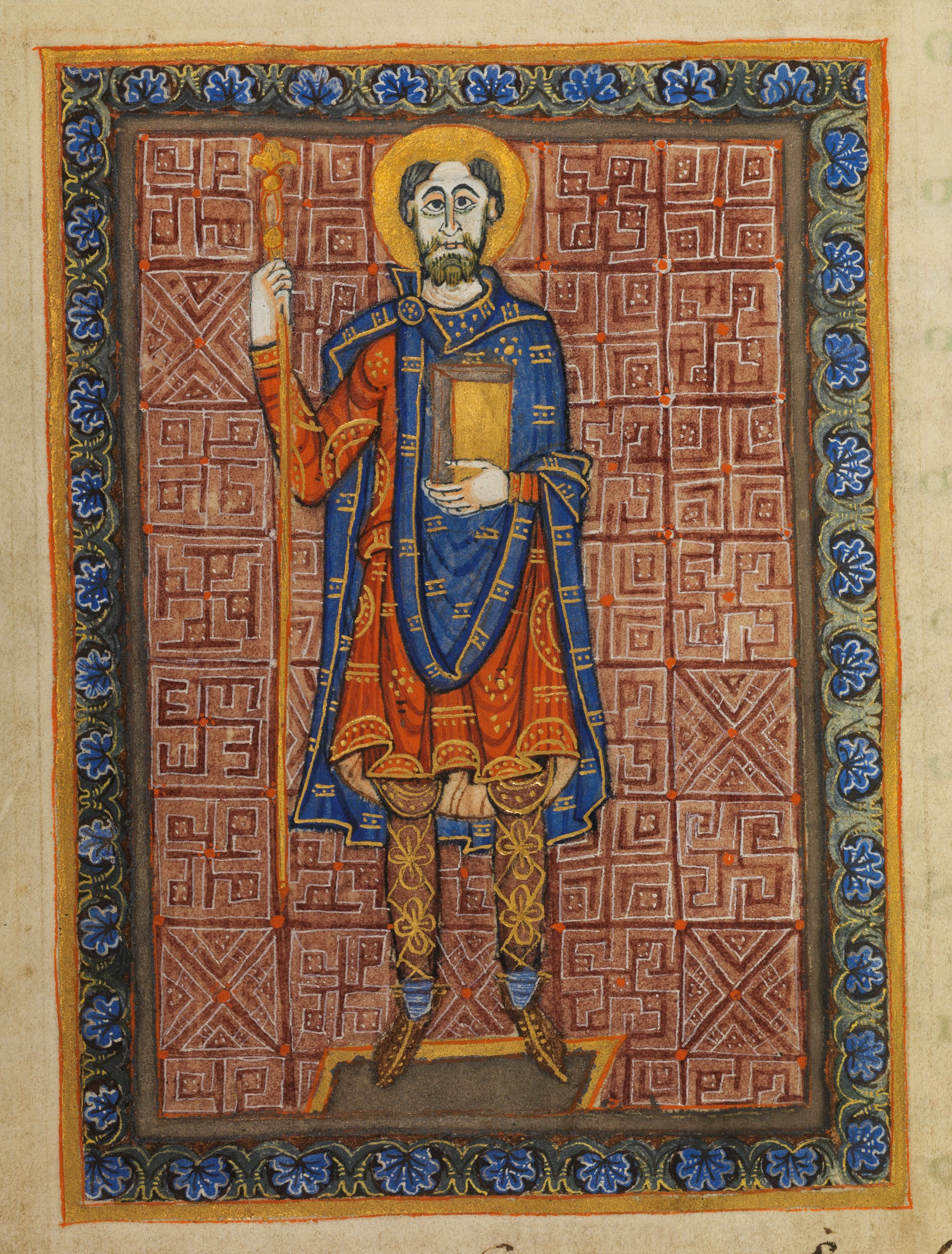
- Henry II of Bavaria, Niedermünster Abbey Book of Rules, c. 990

King of Germany (disputed)
- Reign: 984-985
- Successor: Otto III, Holy Roman Emperor
- Born: 951
- Died: 28 August 995 (aged 43–44); Gandersheim Abbey
- Spouse: Gisela of Burgundy
- Issue: Henry II, Holy Roman Emperor; Gisela, Queen of Hungary; Bruno, Bishop of Augsburg
- Dynasty: Ottonian
- Father: Henry I, Duke of Bavaria
- Mother: Judith of Bavaria

Henry II (951 – 28 August 995), called the Wrangler or the Quarrelsome (German: Heinrich der Zänker), a member of the German royal Ottonian dynasty, was Duke of Bavaria from 955 to 976 and again from 985 to 995, as well as Duke of Carinthia from 989 to 995.

== Life ==
Henry was the son of Duke Henry I of Bavaria, (who in turn was the younger brother of Otto the Great, Holy Roman Emperor and the elder Henry's wife Judith). Henry succeeded his father at the age of four, under the guardianship of his mother. His sister Hadwig was married to Duke Burchard III of Swabia in 954. In 972 Henry married Gisela of Burgundy, a niece of Empress Adelaide.

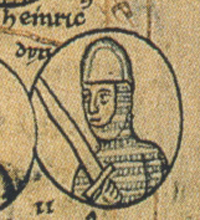
Duke Henry in the pedigree of the Ottonian dynasty, Chronica sancti Pantaleonis, Cologne, 13th century

Upon Emperor Otto's death in 973, Henry could rely on his ties to the South German duchies of Swabia and Bavaria as well as to the adjacent Kingdom of Burgundy. He installed his cousin Henry as Bishop of Augsburg, denying the investiture rights of Emperor Otto's son and successor Otto II. Henry's actions in naming a bishop in a duchy not his own and without Imperial direction brought him into conflict with both Otto II and Burchard III. Not desiring civil war, Otto II, on 22 September 973, invested Henry's nominee as bishop. When his brother-in-law Duke Burchard III died without heirs, he raised claims to his Swabian duchy. However, Otto II enfeoffed his own nephew Otto of Swabia against the tenacious opposition of Burchard's widow Hadwig.

In 974 Duke Henry resolved to oust Otto II from the throne. With support of his sister Hadwig, he forged alliances with Bavarian and Saxon nobles, and also with Duke Boleslaus II of Bohemia and Duke Mieszko I of Poland. Otto II was able to take Henry captive in Ingelheim - though he also had to deal with rebellious nobles in the County of Hainaut and the Bishopric of Cambrai as well as with the raids of the Danish king Harald Bluetooth in Holstein.

In 976 Henry managed to escape and instigated a revolt in Bavaria, but was defeated when Otto II occupied Regensburg and stripped Henry of his duchy. He created the Duchy of Carinthia and the Margraviate of Austria from the Bavarian lands and enfeoffed them to his supporters Henry the Younger (who changed sides shortly afterwards) and Leopold of Babenberg. The smaller Bavarian duchy was ceded to Henry's rival Duke Otto of Swabia. Following the War of the Three Henries in 977/78, the deposed duke was placed under the custody of Bishop Folcmar of Utrecht.

When in 983 Otto II suddenly died from malaria in Rome, Henry was released from captivity. He once again tried to usurp the German throne, when he abducted the infant Otto III and, according to the medieval chronicler Thietmar of Merseburg, had himself proclaimed King of the Romans at the graves of Emperor Otto I and King Henry the Fowler in Magdeburg and Quedlinburg. However, it turned out that he had lost the support of the German dukes and also was not able to oust Duke Henry the Younger from Bavaria.

Through the agency of Archbishop Willigis of Mainz, Henry in 985 finally submitted to Empress Theophanu and her mother-in-law Adelaide at an Hoftag assembly in Rohr. Although he failed in his attempt to gain control of Germany, he did regain Bavaria and in 989 also received the Carinthian duchy.

== Marriage and children ==
Henry and his wife Gisela of Burgundy had the following children:

- Henry IV of Bavaria (973/78–1024), succeeded his father as Duke of Bavaria in 995, fulfilled his father's ambitions when he was elected King of the Romans (as Henry II) in 1002 and crowned Holy Roman Emperor in 1014
- Bruno (d. 1029), Bishop of Augsburg from 1006
- Gisela of Bavaria (984/85–1060), married King Stephen I of Hungary.

== Sources ==
- Bernhardt, John W. (1993). Itinerant Kingship Royal Monasteries in Early Medieval Germany c.936–1075. Cambridge University Press.
- Borovský, Jozef (2019). Chrysalis: Metamorphosis of Odium. Friesen Press.
- Bouchard, Constance Brittain (1999). "Burgundy and Provence, 879-1032". In McKitterick, Rosamond; Reuter, Timothy (eds.). The New Cambridge Medieval History. Vol. 3, c.900 – c.1024. Cambridge University Press. pp. 328–345.
- Poole, Reginald L. (1911). "Burgundian Notes". The English Historical Review. 26 (102 (Apr.)): 310–317. doi:10.1093/ehr/XXVI.CII.310.
- Previté-Orton, C. W. (1979). Shorter Cambridge Medieval History. Vol. 1, The Later Roman Empire to the Twelfth Century. Cambridge University Press.
- Rosenwein, Barbara H. (2009). A Short History of the Middle Ages. Vol. 1 (3rd ed.). University of Toronto Press.
- Warner, David, ed. (2001). Ottonian Germany: The Chronicon of Thietmar of Merseburg. Manchester University Press.

Henry II of Bavaria Ottonian dynasty (Liudolfings) Born: 951 Died: 995
Regnal titles
Preceded by Henry I	Duke of Bavaria; 955–976	Succeeded by Otto I
Preceded by Henry the Younger	Duke of Bavaria; 985–995	Succeeded by Henry the Saint
Preceded by Henry the Younger	Duke of Carinthia; 989–995	Succeeded by Henry the Saint
