= Gisella Loeffler =

Gisella Loeffler Lacher
- Born: ca 1902 near Vienna, Austria
- Died: 12 September 1977; Taos, New Mexico, US
- Education: Washington University in St. Louis
- Known for: painting, illustrator, children's literature, fabric arts, artist
- Notable work: Franzi and Gizi (children's book), Carrie Tingley Hospital murals

Gisella Loeffler (1902–1977) was an Austro-Hungarian–American painter, illustrator and textile artist in a distinctive folk style. She began her career in St Louis, Missouri, before moving to the Taos art colony, New Mexico. Although her style was very different from those of other Taos artists, she was popular with them as well as with the public. Among her best known works are murals she painted in an Albuquerque hospital as part of the 1930s Federal Art Project.

== Early life ==
Gisella Loeffler was born near Vienna in Austria (then Austro-Hungary) ca 1902, and as a young child travelled with family to the United States, where they lived in Missouri. Loeffler trained in traditional painting at the St. Louis School of Fine Arts at Washington University in St. Louis, but was inspired by her childhood memories to paint in a folk style. In 1920, she won a prize at the annual exhibition by St. Louis artists, judged by Paul Dougherty, who bought one of her paintings. The St Louis Friends of Local Artists Society purchased another of her paintings, for display in public schools, and awarded her a scholarship. During the years 1924–1928, Loeffler created black and white images for the cover of the St. Louis Post-Dispatch Sunday Magazine.

== Career ==
Loeffler was commissioned in 1930 to paint the walls and ceiling of a new operating theatre in the Barnes Hospital, to help children forget their fears. This attracted attention around the world. In 1933, Loeffler moved with her daughters to Taos, New Mexico, to live in the Taos art colony. There, she worked for the New Deal Federal Art Project, painting murals in schools and hospitals. She also produced her designs in large batiks, "rich in color and exotic in design", which were exhibited in Albuquerque and St Louis, and installed in hotels. She protested against the abolishment of the Federal Art Project by sending an illustrated letter to Eleanor Roosevelt in 1939.

With the advent of WWII, Loeffler moved to California and painted camouflage on planes. While there, she illustrated a children's book called Franzi and Gizi (1941), by Margery Williams Bianco. Life magazine considered it "one of the best juvenile [book]s of any year", and Kirkus called it "[b]rilliant peasant art". In 1942, The Spanish-American Song and Game Book (a New Deal project), was published, illustrated by Loeffler and her daughter Undine L. Gutierrez. In this book, Loeffler blended her Austro-Hungarian folk art style with Native American and Hispanic subjects. The book was described as "charmingly illustrated", and requests for it were received from around the world. Another book, Little-Boy-Dance by Elizabeth Willis DeHuff, followed in 1946. Reviewers found the illustrations "amusing", "delightful .. a perfect accompaniment to a good story".

After the war ended, Loeffler moved back to Taos. She designed greeting cards for many years, for Associated American Artists, and other companies. Her prints and paintings were sold in frames she had designed and painted. During the 1950s–1970s, Loeffler worked in tapestry, weaving the fabric and embroidering and appliquéing her designs to produce wallhangings. She won awards for her tapestries at the Santa Fe Museum of International Folk Art's 'Craftsmen of New Mexico' show in 1959 and 'Southwestern Craftsmen's Exhibition' in 1967. They were also exhibited around the US in states including Illinois (where a reviewer found them "a joyous feast for the eyes"), California and Texas. In 1957, Metlox Pottery of California issued Loeffler's Happy Time design. It was not a commercial success, and was discontinued after only a few years, but has become highly collectable today. She illustrated three more children's books in the 1960s, the last of which, El Ekeko, she also wrote. Loeffler also carved and painted toys and Christmas decorations, and her work was featured in the Better Homes and Gardens annual Christmas Ideas magazine several times during the 1960s.

== Legacy ==
Although her naive style does not fit within any of the movements or schools within the Taos art colony, she has been described as "a Taos legend", who provided "an uplifting presence" and whose work depicted "children or childlike adults inhabit[ing] a simple, brightly colored world filled with happiness." Long-term Taos resident Mabel Dodge Luhan wrote, in her 1947 book Taos and Its Artists: "Gisella Loeffler! How people are attracted to your funny little painted children and the reassuring life you surround them with! ... Everyone is allured and amused by the life of these robust infants with roses and birds and hearts all about them. It makes people forget that sometimes their life is not so gay." A Taos gallery owner said in 1959, "Gisella is one of our most popular and colorful exhibitors. Popular acceptance of her work easily places her in the top echelon of Southwestern painters." In 1998, an exhibition titled Loeffler and Kloss: Two Taos Legends, held at the Panhandle-Plains Historical Museum, Texas as part of the Taos Art Colony Centennial Celebration, described Loeffler as one of "the best known artists of Taos".

== Personal life ==
Loeffler married Edgar Lacher in the early 1920s, with whom she had two daughters. They divorced in 1933. She married her second husband, Frank P. Chase, in 1949, and they lived in the former Taos home of D.H. Lawrence. Loeffler was known for her colorful clothing, and her colorful home. She decorated her furniture, walls, and windows with her folk designs. She lived in Taos for over 40 years, dying there on 12 September 1977.

== Children's literature ==
- 1941 Franzi and Gizi by Margery Williams Bianco
- 1942 The Spanish-American Song and Game Book (a New Deal project)
- 1946 Little-Boy-Dance by Elizabeth Willis DeHuff
- 1961 The Burro who sat down by Doris Shannon Garst
- 1962 Little Mouse by Charles Paul May
- 1964 El Ekeko (author and illustrator)

== Collections ==
Gisella Loeffler's works are in the collections of the Panhandle-Plains Historical Museum in Canyon, Texas; the Harwood Museum of Art, Taos; the New Mexico Museum of Art (New Deal collection); the Museum of International Folk Art, Santa Fe; and also at the Carrie Tingley Hospital, Albuquerque.
