= Gisella Delle Grazie =

Italian opera composer

Gisella Delle Grazie (born 1 June 1868; fl. 1894–95) was an Italian composer born in Trieste. Delle Grazie composed two operas, Atala (I Pellirossa), premiered at the Teatro Balbo in Turin in 1894, and La trecciaiuola di Firenze, premiered at the Teatro Filodrammatico in Trieste in 1895.
