= Gisèle Gautier =

French politician (born 1938)

Gisèle Gautier (born 9 December 1938) is a French politician and a member of the Senate of France. She represents the Loire-Atlantique department and is a member of the Union for a Popular Movement.
