= Erhard of Regensburg =

Seventh century bishop and saint

Saint Erhard of Regensburg
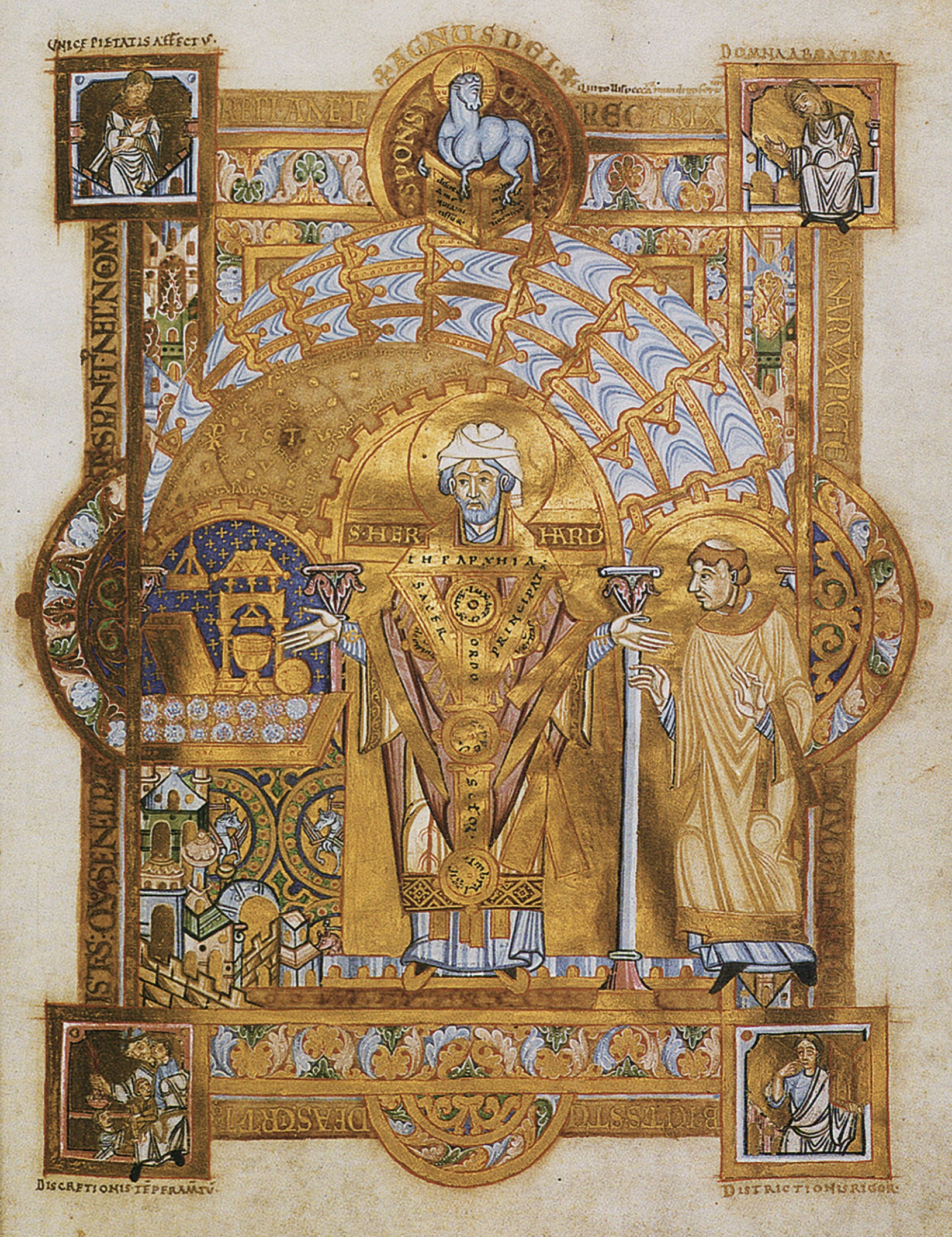
- Saint Erhard reads Mass
- Born: Ireland
- Died: 7th century? Ratisbon, Germany
- Venerated in: Catholic Church; Orthodox Church
- Canonized: 8 October 1052 by Pope Leo IX
- Feast: 8 January

Saint Erhard of Regensburg was bishop of Regensburg in the 7th century. He is identified with an Abbot Erhard of Ebersheimmunster mentioned in a Merovingian diploma of 684. Ancient documents call him also Erard and Herhard.

== Life ==
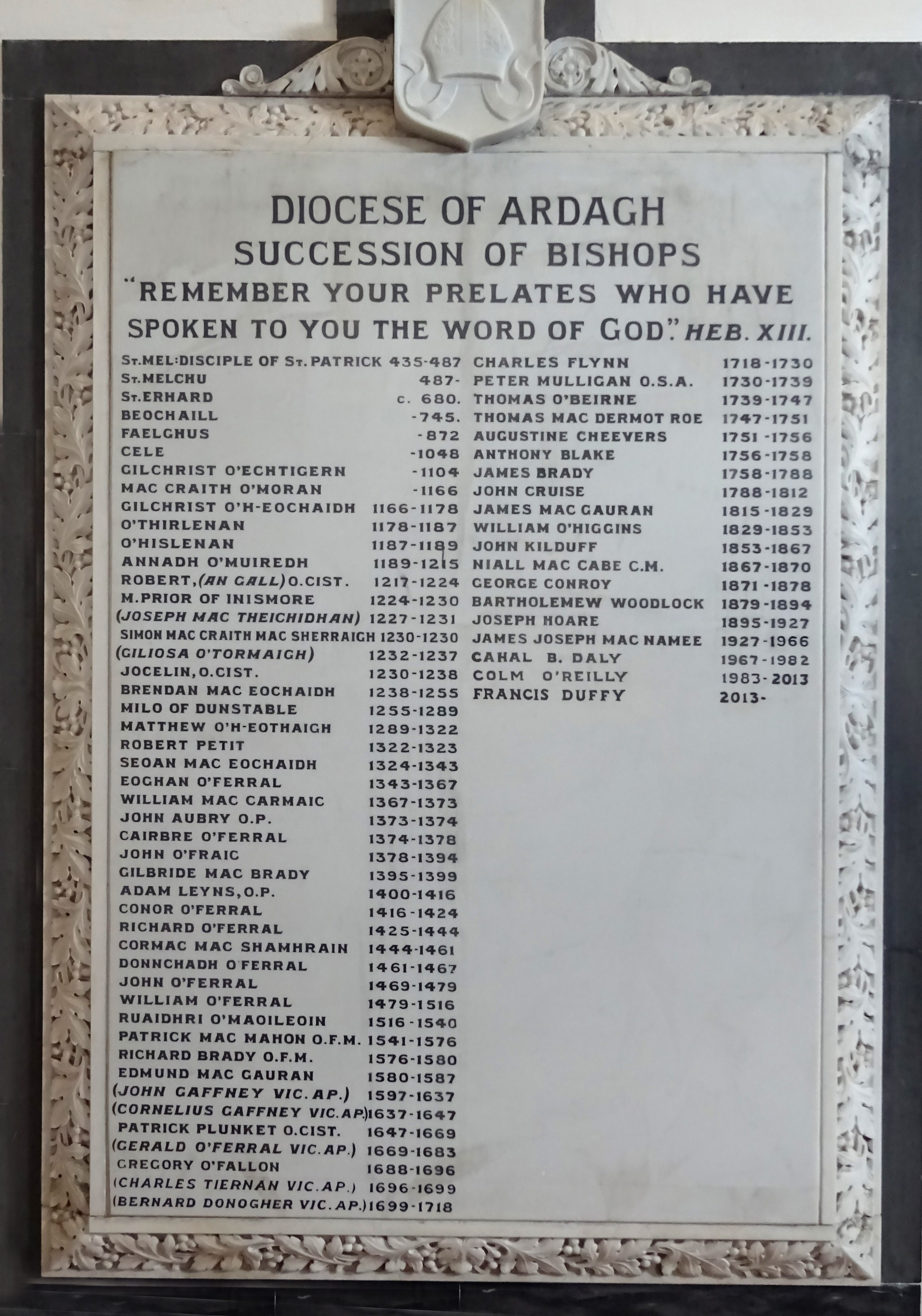
List of the Bishops of Ardagh in St Mel's Cathedral, Ireland, including several spurious medieval bishops. It includes St. Erhard.

Peter Nugent, writing in the Catholic Encyclopedia says, "the legendary account of his life offers little that is historically certain". Erhard was born sometime in the 6th century. Modern scholars believe that he was of Frankish origin, perhaps from Narbonne in southern Gaul. His 11th century biography says he was 'Scoticus', i.e. from Ireland or Scotland. He is identified with an Erhard of Ebersheimmunster mentioned in a Merovingian diploma of 684.

Some believe that Erhard was bishop of Ardagh before crossing to the mainland with Albert of Cashel, said to be his friend or his brother and who is also celebrated on the same date. Eventually they came to Rome. While Albert then went to Jerusalem, Erhard went to Bavaria. (The difficulty with this part of the story is that there is over 100 years separating Erhard and Albert.) There he met Saint Hildulf, said to have been Archbishop of Trier. For some time he shared the solitude of Hildulf who lived as a hermit in the Vosges from 666 to 671.

Erhard was a traveling bishop, one of the early chorepiscopus, that is, a corb bishop or a walking bishop, who without a permanent diocese went from place to place to help the missionaries in their work. Said to have been appointed by Boniface, Erhard was probably a mission bishop at the court of the Agilofinger dukes in Regensburg. After the martyrdom of Emmeram, Erhard became bishop of Regensburg. Many monastic foundations go back to him, above all the famous monastery Niedermünster near Regensburg, which he himself led for a time as abbot. In all, he is said to have founded fourteen monasteries in Bavaria alone, and in the Vosges (Les Vosges) mountain range in the diocese of Strasbourg around seven monasteries. He was possibly the abbot of the monastery of Ebersheim.

In the biography of Odile of Alsace, it is said that she was blind from birth, but that she miraculously regained her sight when she was baptized by Bishop Erhard. Another version states that Odilia was baptized by Hildulf, while Erhard was her godfather at the baptism. He sent a messenger to her father, Adalrich, Duke of Alsace, and reconciled him with his disowned daughter.

Ratisbon was the chief centre of his Apostolic labours, and it was there that he died, but the date is uncertain.

== Veneration ==
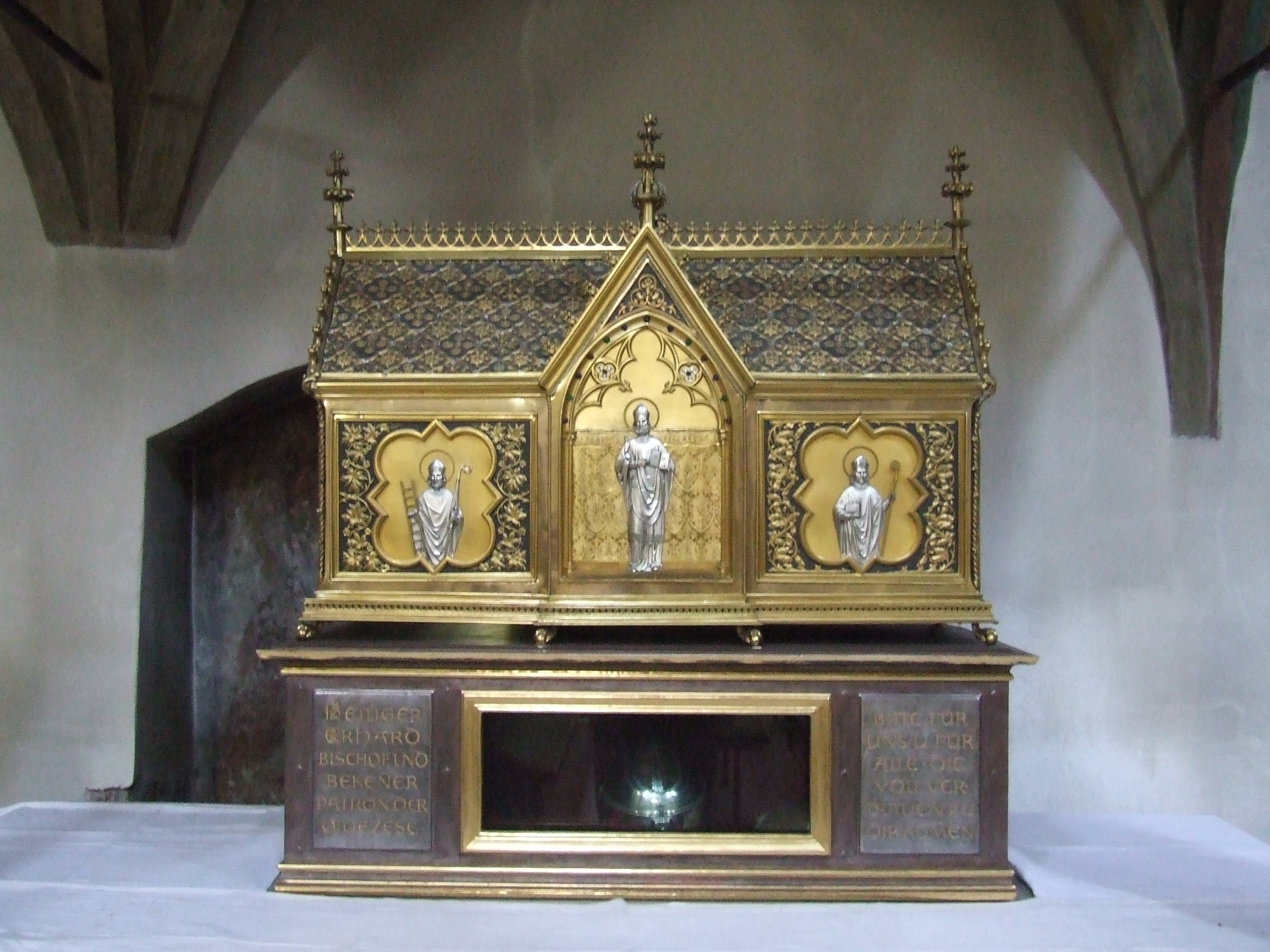
Erhardi-Schrein Niedermünster Regebsburg

Erhard was interred in the still-extant Erhard-crypt at Niedermünster, and miracles were wrought at his grave, that was guarded in the Middle Ages by Erhardinonnen, a religious community of women who observed there a perpetual round of prayer.

Otto II, in 974, made donations of properties in the Danube valley to the convent "where the holy confessor Erhard rests". On 7 Oct 1052 the remains of the holy bishops Erhard and Saint Wolfgang were raised by Pope Leo IX in presence of Emperor Henry III and many bishops, a ceremony which was at that time equivalent to canonization. Regensburg documents, however, mention only the raising of Wolfgang, not that of Erhard. Nonetheless, he is considered to have been canonized in 1052. His relics can be found in a 19th-century silver shrine on the north side of the church. According to an old martyrology from Prague, some of Erhard's relics were transferred there in the time of Emperor Charles IV (1347–78).

At the close of the eleventh century, Paul von Bernried, a monk of Fulda, at the suggestion of Abbess Heilika of Niedermünster, wrote a life of Erhard and added a second book containing a number of miracles. The learned canon of Regensburg, Conrad of Megenberg (d. 1374), furnished a new edition. The church in Niedermünster, now a parish church, still preserves his alleged crosier of the saint, made of black buffalo-horn. A bone of his skull was enclosed in a precious receptacle in 1866. In the high altar in the parish church in the village of Attaching near Freising, there is a beautiful reliquary with an arm relic of Erhard. It was given as a gift in 1720 by Archbishop Johann Franz Eckher.

The most important place of pilgrimage for Erhard has been St. Erhard in Styria in Austria since the 14th century. In the city of Salzburg, the parish church of St. Erhard stands at the foot of Nonnberg.

Three ancient Latin lives of the saint are found in the Acta Sanctorum (8 Jan).

=== Patronage ===
Saint Erhard is a co-patron saint of the Diocese of Regensburg (with Wolfgang and Emmeram); for cattle; for shoemakers, blacksmiths and bakers; against eye diseases, plague and cattle diseases. Many hospitals are under his protection. particularly in Alsace.

=== Iconography ===
Erhard is depicted as a bishop (tabberd, mitre, staff) with a book on which lie two eyes (allusion to the healing of Saint Odilia); Odilia baptizing; with ax (either because he chopped down a sacred tree or because he belongs to the so-called mining saints).

== Trivia ==
- A beer brand from Bamberg, Germany is called St. ERHARD.
- Since Erhard of Regensburg was considered a patron saint for livestock, images of him were used as Schluckbildchen and given to sick animals in the German folk medicine during the eighteenth, nineteenth and the beginning of the twentieth century.

== See also ==
- Emmeram of Regensburg
