= Gisella Neu =

American violinist

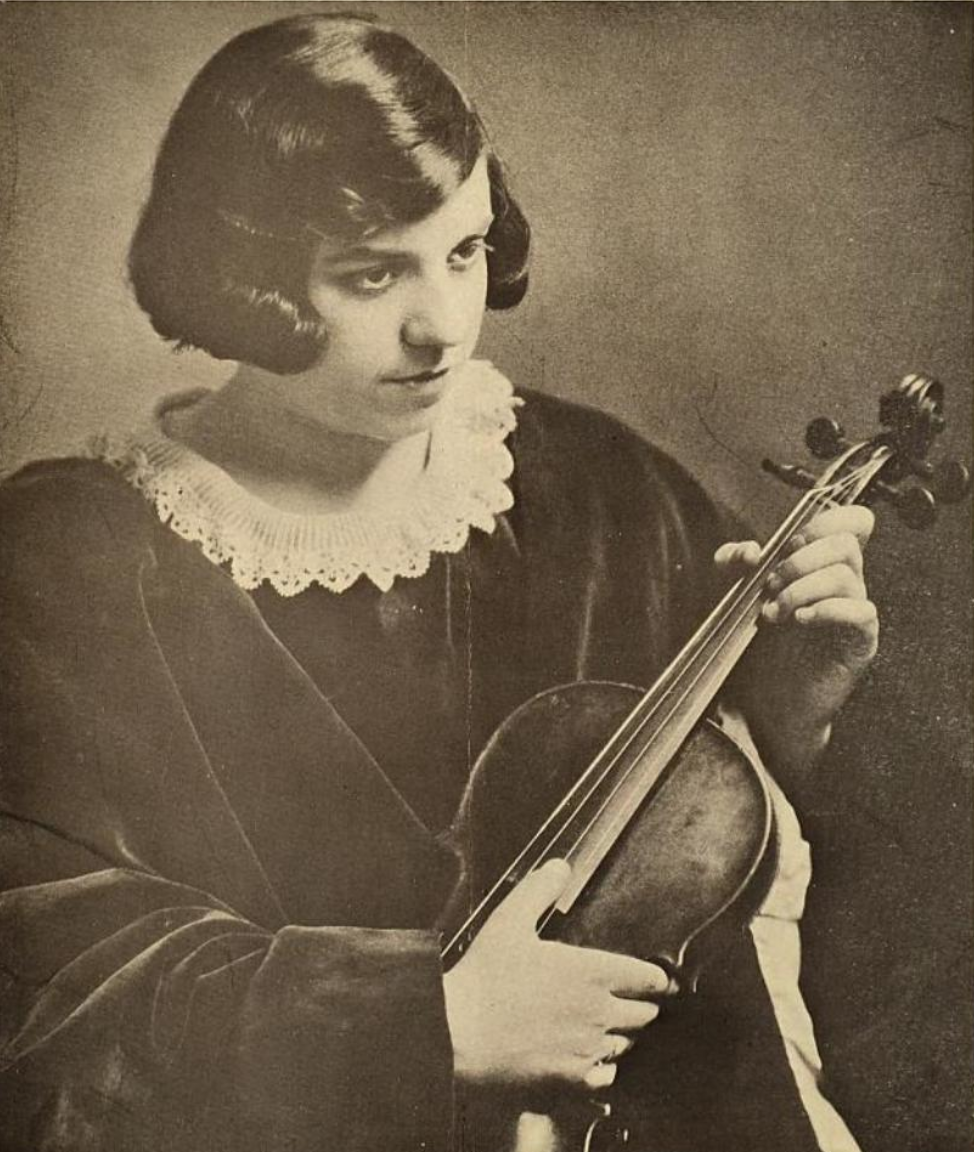
- Gisella Neu, from a 1927 publication
- Born: Gisela Neu; April 25, 1908; Konskau, Austrian Silesia, Austria-Hungary
- Died: December 22, 1989 (aged 81); Los Angeles, California, U.S.
- Other names: Gisella Neu-Fishler
- Occupation: Violinist

Gisella Neu (April 25, 1908 – December 22, 1989), later Gisella Neu-Fishler, was an American violinist, born in Austria-Hungary.

== Early life and education ==
Neu was born in Konskau in Austria-Hungary (now Konská, part of Třinec in the Czech Republic). She was sometimes described as Hungarian. She studied at the Budapest Conservatory of Music, and in the United States with A. H. Trouk.

== Career ==
Neu performed in Budapest, Vienna, and Havana as a child. She performed in New York City for several years, between spring 1925 and 1930. She was also heard on radio programs in this period.

The New York Times reported in March 1929 that Neu's "intonation is generally accurate, her tone warm and ample in volume, and her interpretations are musicianly if not notably brilliant or individual in style." In December 1929, the Times found that her "extreme and manifest nervousness... made it difficult to arrive at a true estimate of her capabilities." At the latter recital, she gave a first performance of a work by Max Fishler, a fantasia dedicated to her.

Neu continued as a violinist after she married Fishler in 1930. She performed at a lecture on Wagner in 1935, at a benefit concert in 1937, and as a soloist at a 1948 concert for the International Music Lovers Guild. In the 1950s and 1960s, as Gisella Neu-Fishler, she performed in Southern California.

== Personal life ==
Neu married philosopher and writer Max Fishler in 1930; she also became a naturalized United States citizen that year. Her husband died in 1981, and she died in 1989, at the age of 81, in Los Angeles.
