= Giselle Zado Wasfie =

Giselle (Zado) Wasfie is an American journalist, magazine editor, fiction author, and former music blogger, who changed careers to become a doctor of Traditional Chinese Medicine. She is also the founder/CEO of REMIX Acupuncture and Integrative Health, LLC, as well as its complementary botanical and organic skincare and aromatherapy line, REMIX by Giselle Wasfie, which has been featured in publications such as Refinery29, Byrdie, and Modern Luxury, among many others.

== Background ==
Wasfie received her bachelor's degree from the University of Michigan, Ann Arbor and her master's in International Journalism from City University, London. She was a student at St Peter's College, Oxford and attended New York University’s prestigious "Summer Publishing Institute", as well as the University of California, Los Angeles "Professional Program in Screenwriting". In 2012, she graduated with a master's degree in Traditional Chinese Medicine, and went on to pursue her doctorate, both from Pacific College of Health and Science. She is a nationally board-certified acupuncturist, and herbalist, and licensed in Illinois, New York, and California.

== Book ==
- So Fly, Giselle Zado Wasfie, New York : St. Martin's-Griffin (2005) ISBN 0-312-33325-0
