= Gisèle Wibaut =

Belgian resistance fighter and politician (1913-1978)

Gisèle Marie Joseph Ghislaine Gérarde Wibaut (born 19 August 1913 in Tournai, deceased 24 October 1978) was a Belgian resistance fighter and politician with the Christian Social Party.

== Career ==
During World War II, she fought in the Belgian resistance. After the War, she was awarded the Medal of the Armed Resistance 1940–1945 and the 1940–1945 War Commemoration Medal.

In the 1950s, she launched a career in politics, as a member of the Christian Social Party. From 1958 to 1968, she served as senator for Ath. From 1968 to 1976, she then served as a municipal councillor for the Tournai City Council. During her time as a city councillor, she also served as Alderwoman for Tournai, from 1970 until 1976.

She died in October 1978, at the age of 65.

== Personal life ==
Her father, Edmond Wibaut, was a lawyer and politician with the Catholic Party, who previously served as mayor of Tournai.

== Sources ==
- Het Belgisch parlement 1894-1969, P.Van Molle, Gand, Erasmus, 1969.
- Biografisch repertorium der Belgische parlementairen, senatoren en volksvertegenwoordigers 1830 tot 1.8.1965, R. Devuldere, Gand, R.U.G., thèse de licence en histoire inédite, 1965.
- Dico des femmes belges
