= Gisli (contemporary musician) =

Icelandic musician

Gisli is an Icelandic solo musician, singer-songwriter and multi-instrumentalist now operating in London, UK. His brand of pop-rock has been likened to, amongst others, Beck.

He had some degree of chart success in the United Kingdom with his debut album 'How About That?' (2004) and appeared at Glastonbury Festival in 2004.

His second album, Build-Ups And Break-Downs, was recently released on EMI.

Gisli has also produced and written songs for other artists, including Norwegian artist Anja Garbarek. Her album Briefly shaking was co-written/produced by Gisli and later picked up by French director Luc Besson for use in his movie Angel-A.

In addition to his solo and production career, Gisli is also a full-time member of the group Half Tiger.
