= Ghislain de Montgolfier =

Ghislain de Montgolfier (born 1943) is a French winemaker, and the former head of the Bollinger Champagne house, and the sixth generation to run the family business.

Montgolfier was born in 1943, and grew up in Paris.

In 1994, Montgolfier, great-great-grandson of founder Joseph Bollinger became head of Bollinger, succeeding Christian Bizot, who had been president since 1978. In 2008, he was succeeded by Jérôme Philipon, the first non-family member to head Bollinger.

Montgolfier is a former president of the Union of Champagne Houses.
