= Gisèle Bienne =

French writer (born 1946)

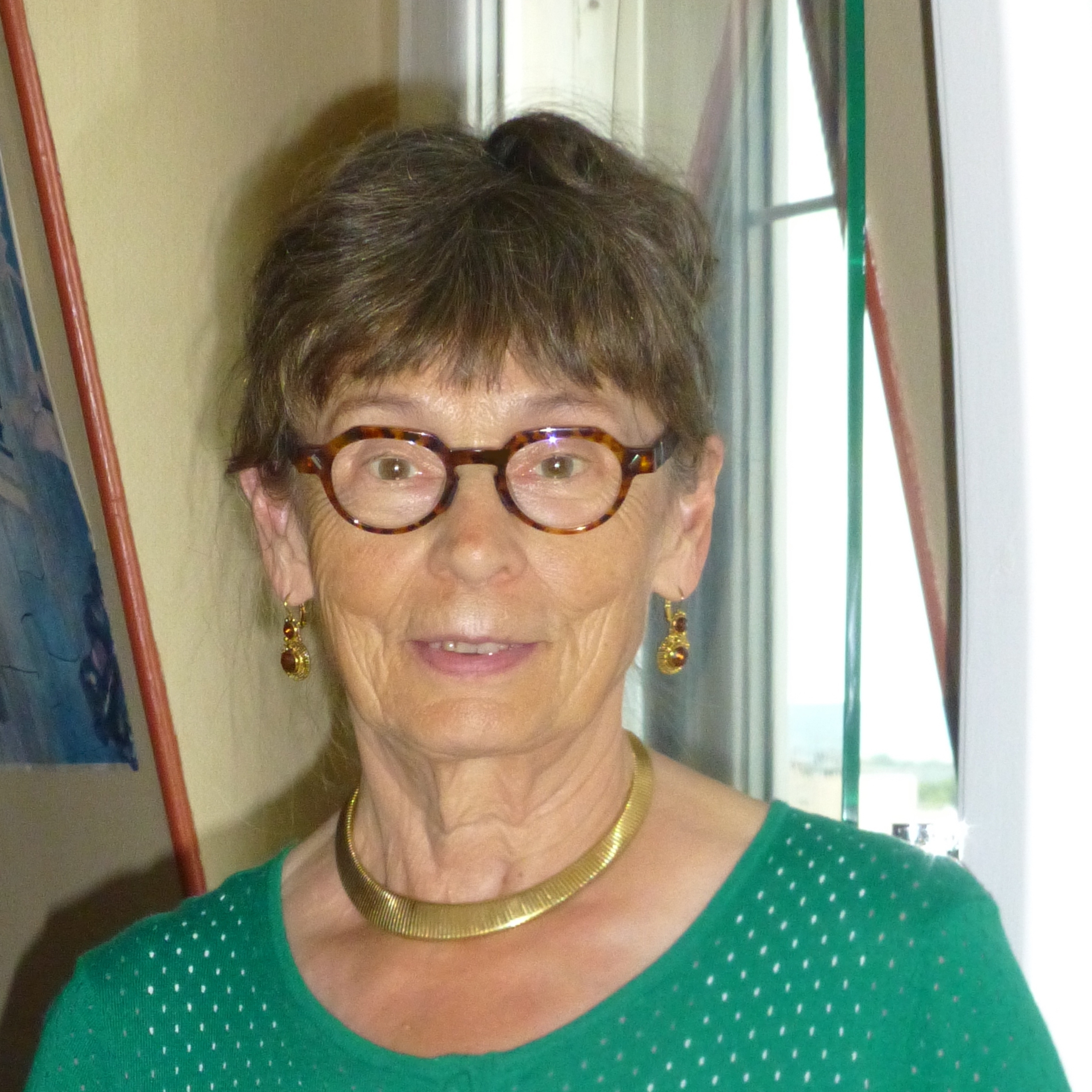
Gisèle Bienne (2017).

Gisèle Bienne (French pronunciation: [ʒizɛl bjɛn]; born 1946 in Chavanges, Aube) is a French writer who has written many novels. She lives in Reims, where she conducts writing workshops after she has been literature teacher and painter. She has published more than a dozen novels and won two literary awards. She also writes for magazines. She writes for adults and teens that she has met in college and high schools.

== Works ==
- Marie-salope, 1976
- Douce amère, 1977
- Rose enfance, 1978
- Je ne veux plus aller à l'école, 1980
- Bleu, je veux, 1983
- Premières alliances, 1988
- Rémuzor, 1994
- Un cheval sans papiers, 2005
- Chicago, je reviendrai, 2007
- Tatiana, sous les toits, 2008
- La chasse à l'enfant, 2009
- Grandir avec le Stade de Reims, 2022
