= Gisela of Burgundy =

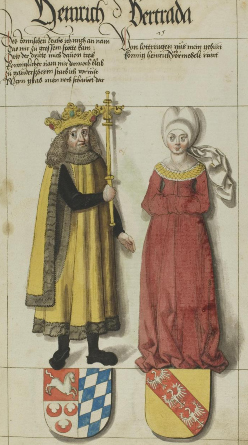
- Duke Henry II of Bavaria and his wife, by Lucas Cranach the Elder (1564)

Duchess consort of Bavaria
- Tenure: 972–976; 985–995
- Born: c. 955
- Died: 21 July 1007; Regensburg, Bavaria
- Burial: Niedermünster Abbey
- Spouse: Henry II, Duke of Bavaria
- Issue: Henry II, Holy Roman Emperor; Gisela, Queen of Hungary; Bruno, Bishop of Augsburg
- House: Elder House of Welf
- Father: Conrad I of Burgundy
- Mother: Adelaide of Bellay

Gisela of Burgundy (c. 955 – 21 July 1007), a member of the royal Elder House of Welf, was Duchess of Bavaria from about 972 to 976 and again from 985 to 995, by her marriage with Duke Henry the Wrangler. She was the mother of Emperor Henry II.

== Life ==
Gisela was the eldest daughter of King Conrad I of Burgundy (c. 925 – 993), presumably from his first marriage with Adelaide of Bellay. The domain her father ruled and where she was born is also called the Kingdom of Arles. After her mother's death, King Conrad married Matilda, a daughter of the West Frankish king Louis IV; among her half-siblings were Rudolph III, who succeeded his father as King of Arles (Bourgogne Transjurane in French or 'King of Burgundy') and Bertha, who married King Robert II of France in 996.

Gisela's father ruled over the united Kingdom of Burgundy since 937, after he had been able to reject claims raised by King Hugh of Italy. The minor king was brought into safety by Otto I, then King of East Francia, who thereby scuppered Hugo's plans. In 951 Otto married Conrad's sister Saint Adelaide of Burgundy, the widow of Hugo's son King Lothair II of Italy.

About 965 Gisela was betrothed to Otto's nephew Henry the Wrangler, who then ruled as Duke of Bavaria; the couple married some time before 972. Emperor Otto I died in 973 and was succeeded by his son Otto II. The 18-year-old had to cope with the Burgundian relations of his Bavarian cousin, forming a considerable power bloc in the southern domains of his realm.

Gisela's husband revolted immediately, when upon the death of Henry's brother-in-law Duke Burchard III of Swabia in 973, Emperor Otto II skipped his claims and vested his nephew Otto with the Swabian duchy. During several years of bitter fighting, Duke Henry was arrested in the Imperial Palace of Ingelheim, fled, was declared deposed in 976, and again taken in the custody of Bishop Folcmar of Utrecht two years later. Gisela with her young son Henry II sought refuge with Bishop Abraham of Freising; during her husband's imprisonment, she resided in Merseburg.

Henry was not released until the emperor's death in 983. He again tried to snatch the crown from the minor successor Otto III, however, with the intervention by Dowager Empress Theophanu and her predecessor, Gisela's aunt Adelaide of Burgundy, he finally submitted in 985 and regained his Bavarian duchy.

== Marriage and children ==
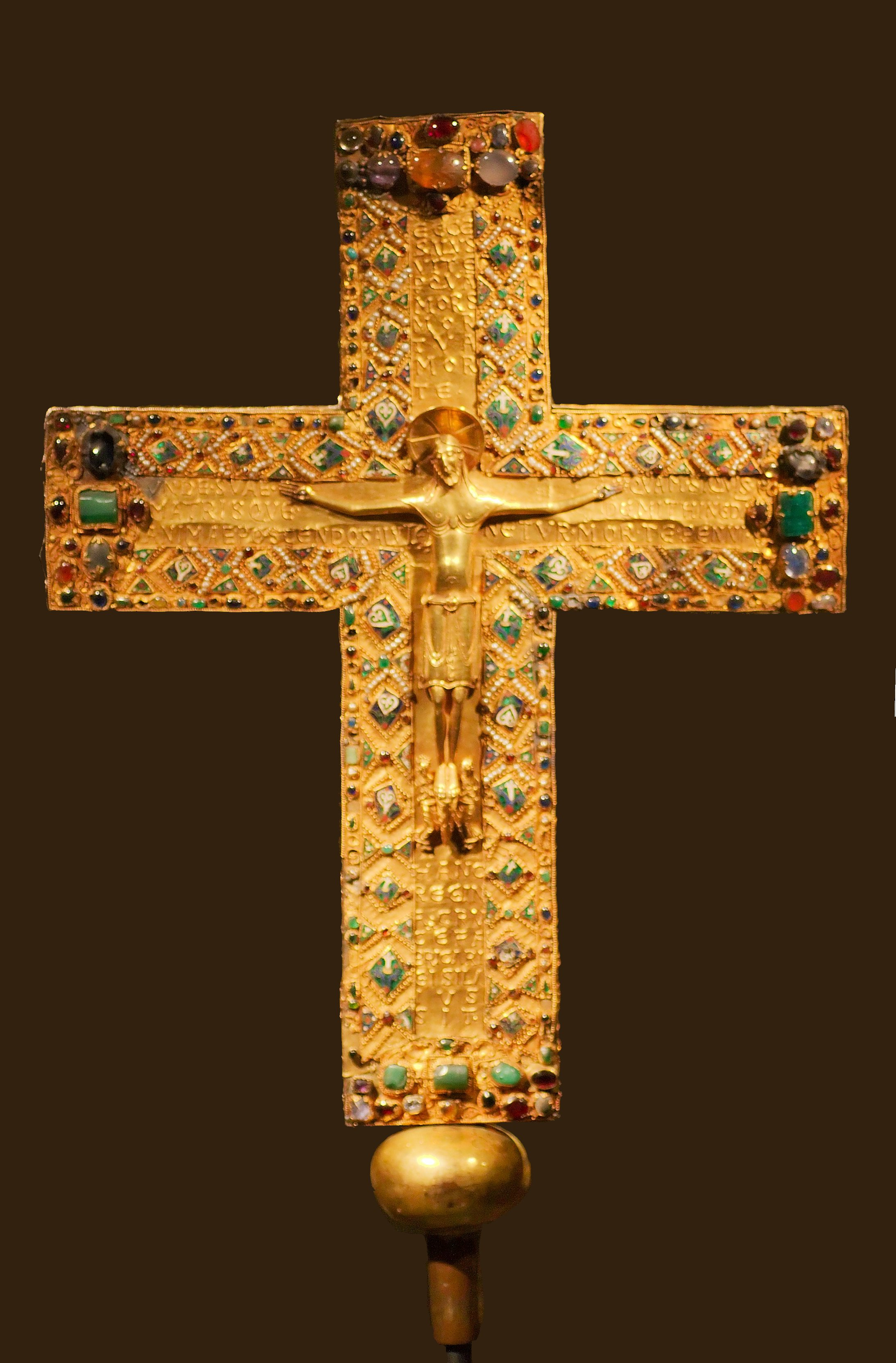
Gisela Cross

With Henry, Gisela had three children:

- Henry IV of Bavaria (973–1024), succeeded his father as Duke of Bavaria in 995, fulfilled his father's ambitions when he was elected King of the Romans (as Henry II) in 1002 and crowned Holy Roman Emperor in 1014
- Bruno (died 1029), Bishop of Augsburg from 1006
- Gisela (c.985–1060), married King Stephen I of Hungary

Henry II was already mentioned as a Bavarian condux in 994. Gisela lived to see her son's accession to the throne in the royal election of 1002. According to the chronicles by Thietmar of Merseburg, she died on 21 July 1007. She was buried in the abbey of Niedermünster, Regensburg. Her daughter Gisela of Hungary donated an opulent burial cross, known as Giselakreuz, which today is part of the collections at the Munich Residenz treasury.

Preceded by Judith, Duchess of Bavaria	Duchess consort of Bavaria; 972–976; 985–995	Succeeded by Cunigunde of Luxembourg
