= Princess Gisela of Liechtenstein =

Liechtensteiner royal and businesswoman

Princess Gisela
- Born: 26 June 1990 (age 36); Feldkirch, Austria
- Spouse: Victor Bergmann
Names
- Gisela Maria
- House: Liechtenstein
- Father: Prince Michael Karl of Liechtenstein
- Mother: Hildegard Peters
- Occupation: businesswoman
- Education: ETH Zurich (BS, MS)

Princess Gisela Maria of Liechtenstein (born 26 June 1990) is a Liechtensteiner royal and businesswoman. She is the CEO of the wealth management company Industrie-Und Finanzkontor. In 2026, she was appointed to the Roman Curia by Pope Leo XIV as a lay member of the Council for the Economy of the Holy See.

== Early life and family ==
Princess Gisela of Liechtenstein was born on June 26, 1990, in Feldkirch, Austria to Prince Michael of Liechtenstein and Hildegard Berta Peters. She is a granddaughter of Archduchess Elisabeth of Austria and a great-granddaughter of Emperor Charles I of Austria and Zita of Bourbon-Parma.

== Education and career ==
She graduated from ETH Zurich with a bachelor's degree and a master's degree in environmental engineering. In 2022, she obtained a Diplomierter Treuhand Experte (a certified trust expert credential) from the University of Liechtenstein.

She worked at the London investment bank Hannam & Partners and at the Canadian gold mining development company Midas Gold Corp. Gisela serves as the CEO of Industrie-Und Finanzkontor, a wealth management business founded by the Liechtenstein princely family.

In August 2026, she was appointed by Pope Leo XIV to serve a five-year term on the Council for the Economy of the Holy See, which sets policy guidelines for the Secretariat for the Economy and analyzes its managing of the Vatican's finances. She is one of seven laypeople appointed to the fifteen-member council.

== Personal life ==
In 2020, she became engaged to German businessman Victor Bergmann. They married in 2022.
