= Gisela of Hungary =

Queen of Hungary from 1000/1001 to 1038; Catholic saint

Blessed Gisela
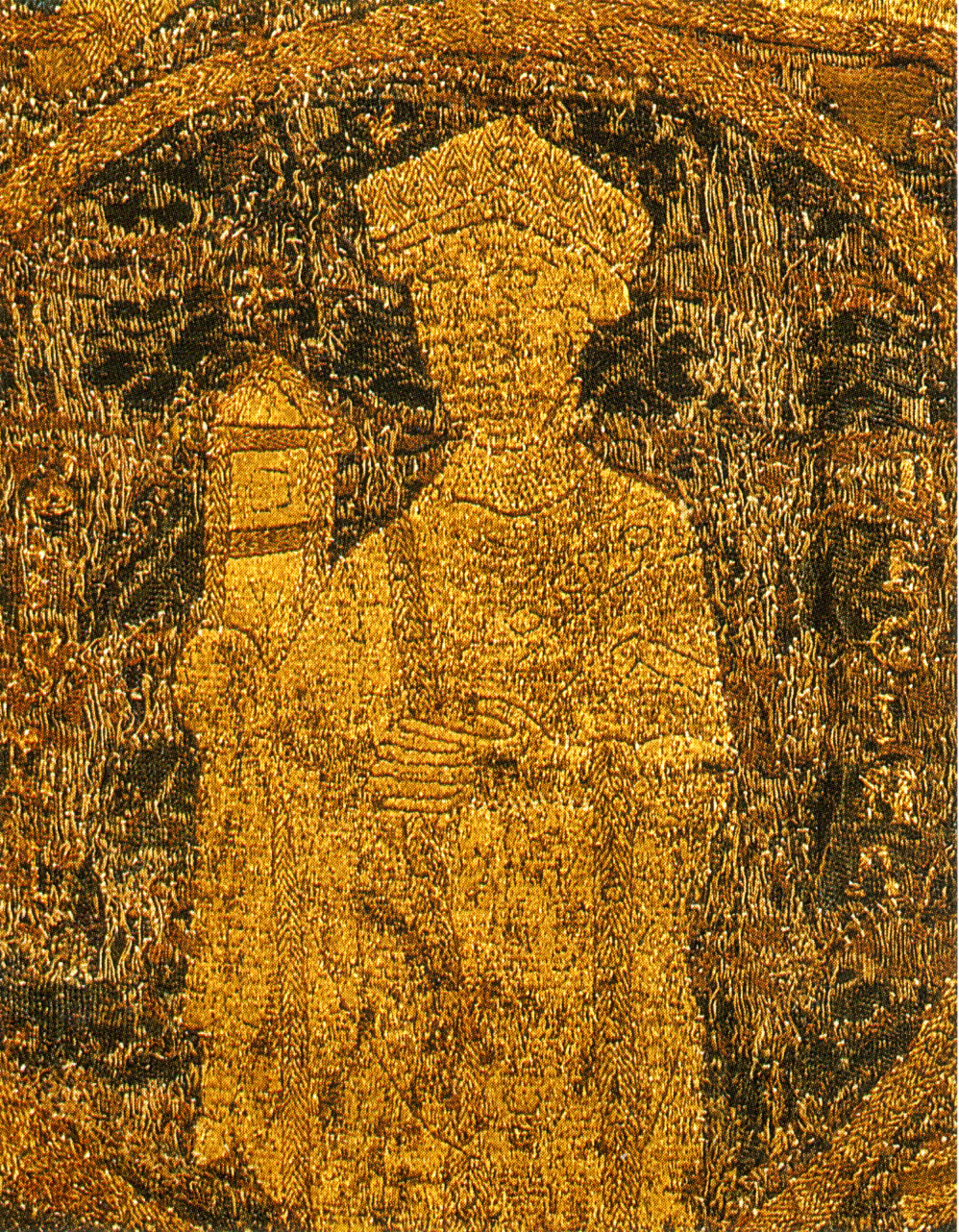
- Portrayal of Queen Gisela on the Hungarian coronation pall (chasuble) from 1031

Queen consort of Hungary
- Tenure: 1000 or 1001–1038

Grand Princess of the Hungarians
- Tenure: c. 997 – 1000 or 1001
- Born: c. 985
- Died: 7 May 1065; Passau, Germany
- Burial: Niedernburg Abbey, Passau, Germany
- Spouse: Stephen I of Hungary (m. 996; died 1038)
- Issue: Otto; Saint Emeric
- Dynasty: Ottonian
- Father: Henry II, Duke of Bavaria
- Mother: Gisela of Burgundy
- Religion: Roman Catholic

Gisela of Hungary (or Gisele, Gizella and of Bavaria; c. 985 – 7 May 1065) was the first queen consort of Hungary by marriage to Stephen I of Hungary, and the sister of Henry II, Holy Roman Emperor. She has been beatified by the Catholic Church.

== Biography ==
Gisela was a daughter of Henry II, Duke of Bavaria and Gisela of Burgundy. Gisela received a solid Catholic education, most likely with bishop Wolfgang of Regensburg as her teacher. She married King Stephen I of Hungary in 996 as a part of Hungary's policy of opening up to the West. The couple had a son, Saint Emeric, who died on 2 September 1031, while hunting boar. The wedding of Stephen and Gisela marked a turning point in Hungary's history.

Queen Gisela played a fundamental role in spreading the Christian faith and Western culture in Hungary.

When Edmund Ironside of England died, he was succeeded by Cnut. Edmund's infant sons were sent abroad and ended up under the protection of King Stephen of Hungary. One of the twins died young, but the other, Edward Atheling, was brought up as a protégé of Queen Gisela, and regarded in that foreign court as the heir to the Anglo-Saxon throne.

King Stephen died in 1038. In 1046 Gisela, her attendants, and a number of many Bavarian settlers left Hungary to return to Bavaria, where she joined Niedernburg convent in Passau and became the abbess.

She lived in the nunnery of Niedernburg in Passau, where she died.

== Veneration ==
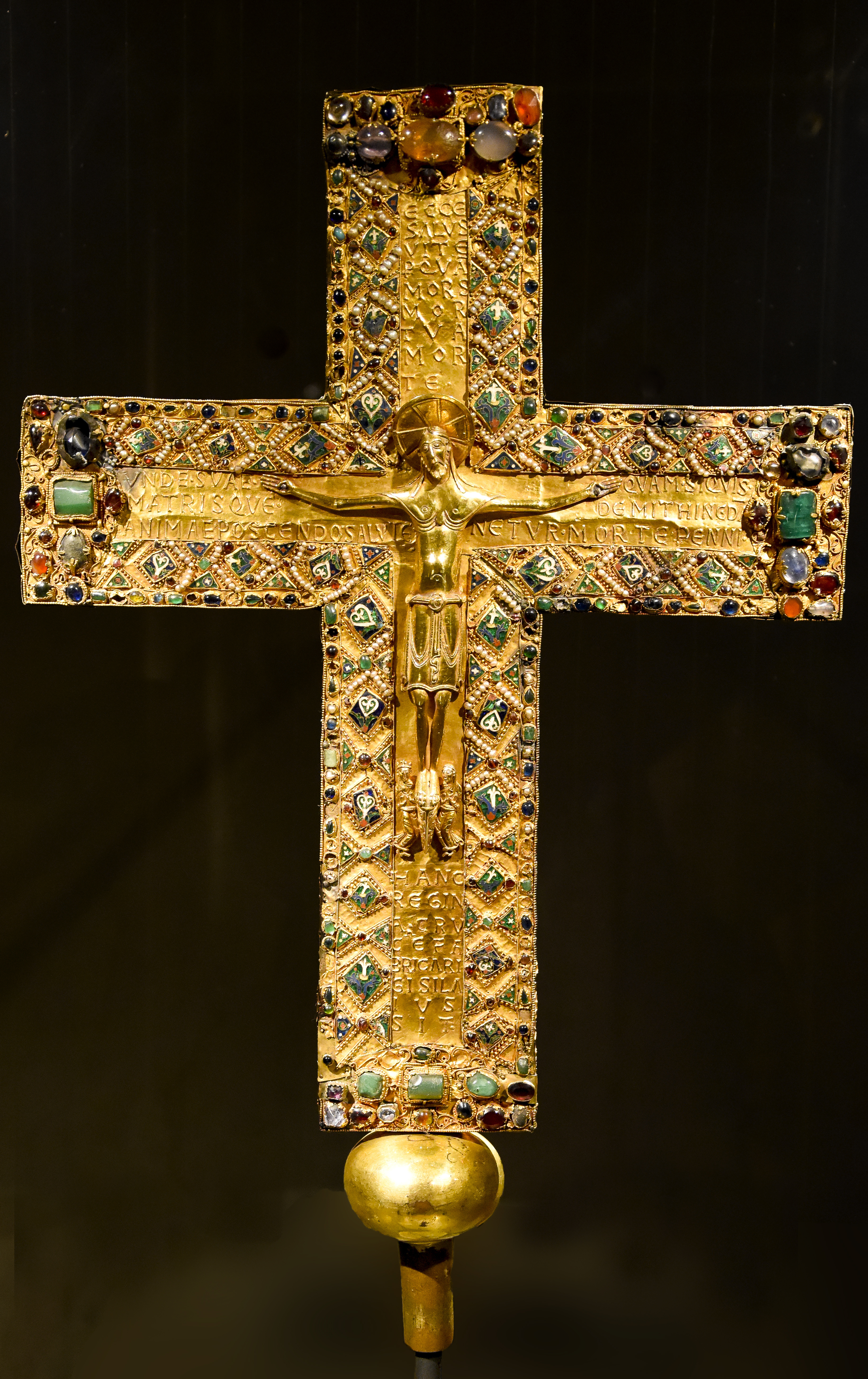
The Giselakreuz (ca. 1006) in the Schatzkammer of the Munich Residenz

Gisela's canonisation was attempted in the 18th century, but failed. She was beatified in 1975. Her memorial days are 7 May and 1 February.

Gisela and her husband were not buried together. On 4 May 1996, the preserved remains of King Stephen's right hand were brought back together with a bone taken from Gisela's arm for a special mass celebrating the 1,000th anniversary of their wedding at St. Michael's Cathedral in the western Hungarian town of Veszprém, where Gisela once lived. His hand is normally displayed at St. Stephen's Basilica in Budapest.

Her grave is well known, and regarded as a holy place. A jewelled cross was commissioned by Queen Gisela for the tomb of her mother, who died in 1006 and was buried in the Niedermünster in Regensburg.

Gisela is depicted on a white limestone panel by Hungarian artist Sandor Kiss on the wall of the Chapel of Our Lady – Queen of Hungary in St. Peter's Basilica, Rome.

== Sources ==
- Butler, Alban (1995). "Bd Giselle of Bavaria". Butler's Lives of the Saints. London: Burns & Oates. p. 39. ISBN 0-86012-254-9.
- Györffy, György (1996). "Gisela, erste Königin von Ungarn". Bd 17, Hefte zur Bayerischen Geschichte und Kultur. Augsburg: Haus der Bayerischen Geschichte. p. 15. ISBN 3-927233-45-5.

Gisela of Hungary Ottonian dynasty Born: c. 980 Died: 2 August 1058
Royal titles
Preceded by Sarolt	Grand Princess of the Hungarians; 997–1000 or 1001	Became queen
New title	Queen consort of Hungary; 1000 or 1001–1038	Vacant Title next held by Anastasia of Kiev as the next confirmed queen
