= Regelinda of Zürich =

Duchess of Swabia

Regelinda
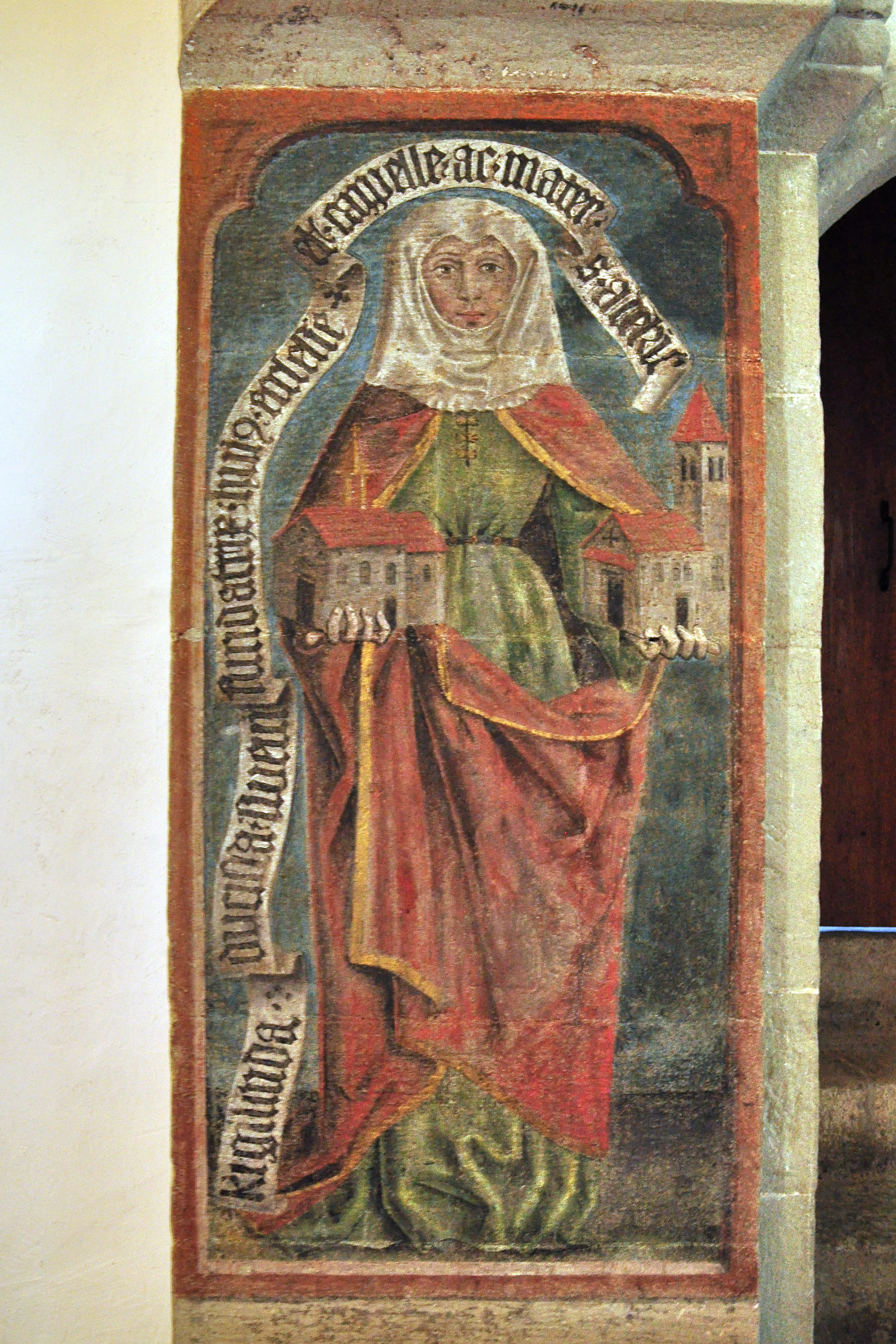
- Fresco of Regelinda in the Church of St. Peter and Paul on the island of Ufenau
- Died: 958
- Spouse: Burchard II, Duke of Swabia; Herman I, Duke of Swabia
- Issue: Burchard III, Duke of Swabia; Bertha of Swabia; Gisela, Abbess of Waldkirch
- Father: Eberhard I, Count of Zürich
- Mother: Gisela

Regelinda (Note: Also Reginlind, Regilinda, Reginilda, Reginlinda, Regulinda or Regilinde) of Zürich (died in 958) was Duchess of Swabia through her first marriage to Burchard II. After the death of her first husband, she married Hermann of Swabia in 926.

Regelinda's origins go back to the Carolingians; her great-granduncle was Louis the German. Through her great-grandfather, Eberhard of Friuli, she was related to the Unruochings. Her great-grandmother was Gisela, daughter of Louis the Pious.

== Life ==
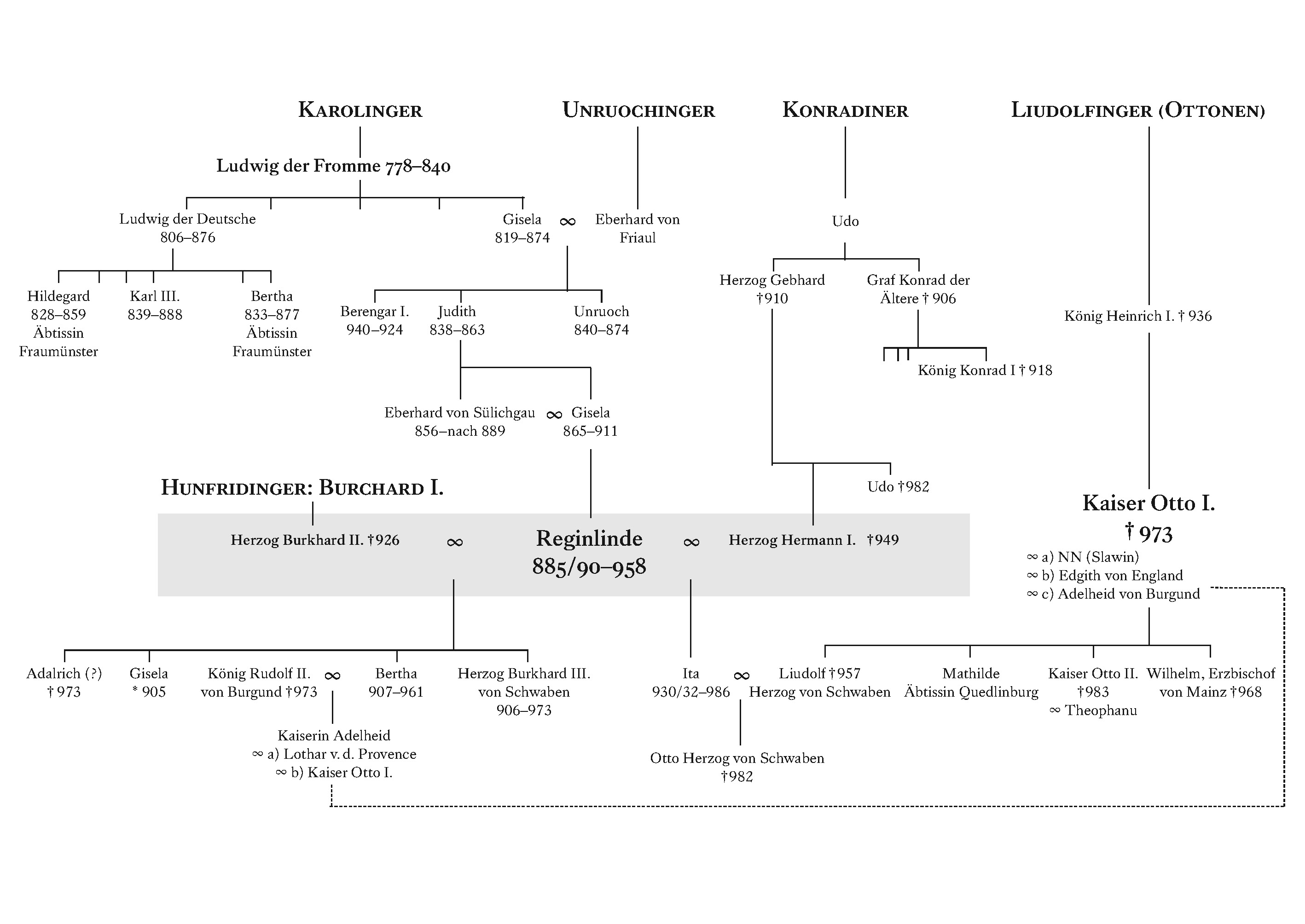
Family tree of Regelinda with Eberhard von Sülichgau as her father

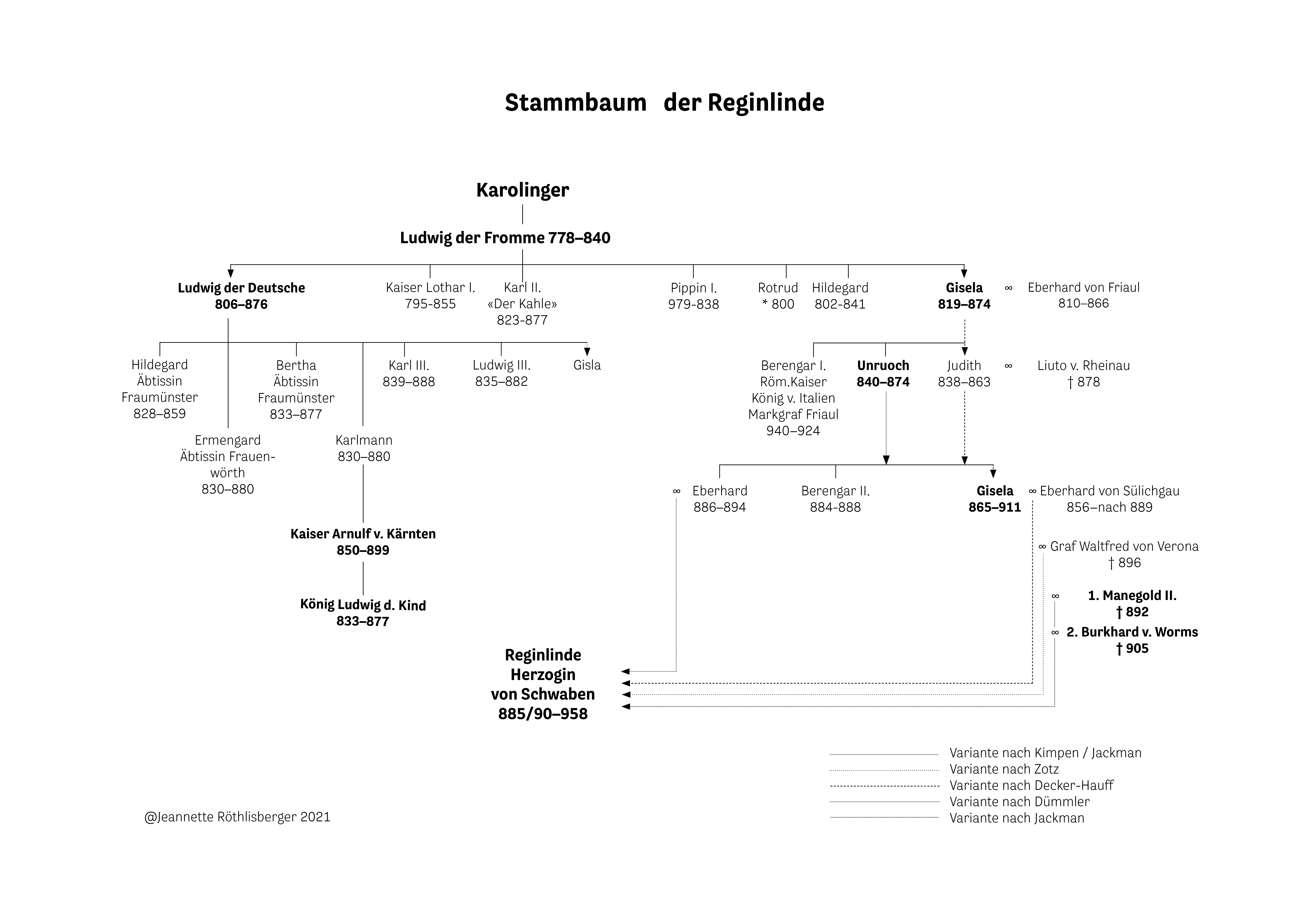
Family tree showing the different hypothesis regarding her paternity

Of Carolingian descent, her mother was Gisela, a daughter of Judith, daughter of Eberhard of Friuli and the Carolingian princess Gisela, daughter of Louis the Pious. Her mother was thus a niece of Berengar I of Italy. Her father was Eberhard I, Count of Zürich or possibly Waltfred, Margrave of Verona and Friuli. Eberhard was himself of Carolingian descent, a son of Unruoch III of Friuli (son of Gisela, daughter of Louis the Pious), of Adalhard von Burc (also a Unruoching and a son of Eberhard of Friuli and Gisela), or of Liuto von Rheinau and Judith "von Balingen".

She is said to have grown up in the Säckingen monastery and was married to Count Burkhard II in 904. Together with him, Regelinda founded the convent of St. Margarethen in Waldkirch. Through the marriage of her children, she had close contacts both with the Kingdom of Burgundy (Bertha married King Rudolf II of Burgundy) and the royal court of the Ottonians (Ida married the eldest son of Otto the Great, Liudolf). The marriage of her daughter Bertha to King Rudolf II of Burgundy produced a daughter, Adelaide, who, as the wife of Emperor Otto the Great, was to become one of the most important women of the 10th century.

After the death of her second husband, she retired to the Zürich monastery Felix and Regula, today the Fraumünster. She had presided over this monastery as a lay abbess since 929. Regelinda is also known as the lay abbess of the Säckingen convent.

Adalrich, who built a hermitage on the island of Ufenau in Lake Zurich, is often mentioned as the son of Regelinda, but this has not been proven. Regelinda built a house there and renovated the existing Martinskapelle (Reginlindenkapelle) and donated the parish church of St. Peter and Paul, which was completed under Adalrich.

From her fortune she made large endowments to the newly established Einsiedeln monastery, and through her many connections to the royal house of Otto I, the monastery was granted the privilege of immunity and free abbot elections in 947.

Regelinda died on 8 August 958 at Ufenau and was buried in Einsiedeln Abbey.

== Issue ==
From her first marriage to Burchard II, Duke of Swabia:

- Gisela, Abbess of Waldkirch (c. 905 – 26 October 923 /25)
- Hicha (c. 905 – 950), mother of Conrad the Red (uncertain)
- Burchard III (c. 915 – 12 November 973)
- Bertha (c. 907 – 2 January 961), mother of Adelaide of Italy
- Adalrich, the holy monk in Einsiedeln (died in 973) (uncertain)

From her second marriage to Herman I, Duke of Swabia:

- Ida, also Ita, wife of Liudolf, son of Emperor Otto the Great

== Veneration ==
She is venerated in the Catholic Church on 8 August or on 16 August.
