= Gisela (mother of Regelinda) =

Unruoching noblewoman

- Born: c. 865
- Died: c. 911
- Spouse: Eberhard I, Count of Zürich
- Issue: Judith; Regelinda of Zurich, Duchess of Swabia
- Father: Liuto von Rheinau
- Mother: Judith

Gisela was an Unruoching noblewoman and the mother of Regelinda of Zürich, Duchess of Swabia.

Her father was Liuto (Liutold) von Rheinau, attested as bailiff of the Rheinau monastery in 878, a son of Count Liutold, who married Judith "von Balingen". Judith was the daughter of Eberhard of Friuli and Gisela, daughter of Louis the Pious and Judith of Bavaria. She was thus a descendant of Charlemagne.

She married her first cousin, Eberhard of Sülichgau, and they had at least two daughters, Judith (who married Arnulf, Duke of Bavaria, and was the mother of Eberhard and Judith.) and Regelinda of Zürich, Duchess of Swabia.

Other sources state that Gisela's father was in fact Unruoch III of Friuli, an Unruoching, himself of Carolingian descent.
