= Duchess of Swabia =

Title in the Kingdom of Germany

The Duchess of Swabia was the wife of the Duke of Swabia, ruler of the Duchy of Swabia which existed from 915 to 1313 as part of the Kingdom of Germany. If the duke was unmarried there was no duchess. This is a list of holders of the title.

== Duchess of Alamannia ==
- Daughter of Theodo of Bavaria, wife of Duke Gotfrid
- Hereswind, wife of Duke Hnabi

== Queen of Alamannia ==
=== Carolingian dynasty, 876–882 ===
Picture	Name	Father	Born	Wed	Husband	Became Consort	Ceased to be Consort	Died
	Richardis of Swabia	Erchanger, Count of the Nordgau (Ahalolfinger)	840	1 August 862	Charles the Fat	28 August 876; Partition of East Francia	20 January 882; Reunification of East Francia	18 September, between 894 and 896

== Duchess of Swabia ==
=== Hunfriding dynasty, 909–911 ===
Picture	Name	Father	Born	Wed	Husband	Became Duchess	Ceased to be Duchess	Died
	Liutgard of Saxony	Liudolf, Duke of Saxony (Liudolfings)	845	882	Burchard I	909 husband's accession	5/23 November 911 husband's death	17/30 November 885

=== Ahalolfing dynasty, 915–917 ===
- None

=== Hunfriding dynasty, 917–926 ===
Name	Father	Born	Wed	Husband	Became Duchess	Ceased to be Duchess	Died
Regelinda of Zürich	Eberhard I, Count of Zürich	890	before 911	Burchard II	after 21 January 917 husband's accession	29 April 926 husband's death	958, after 29 April

=== Conradine dynasty, 926–949 ===
Name	Father	Born	Wed	Husband	Became Duchess	Ceased to be Duchess	Died
Regelinda of Zürich	Eberhard I, Count of Zürich	890	926	Herman I	926	10 December 949 husband's death	958 after 29 April

=== Ottonian dynasty, 950–954 ===
Name	Father	Born	Wed	Husband	Became Duchess	Ceased to be Duchess	Died
Ida (Ita) of Swabia	Herman I, Duke of Swabia (Conradines)	930s	27 October 947 or 7 April 948	Liudolf	950 husband's accession	954 husband's deposition	17 May 986

=== Hunfriding dynasty, 954–973 ===
Name	Father	Born	Wed	Husband	Became Duchess	Ceased to be Duchess	Died
Hedwig (Hadwig) of Bavaria^{†}	Henry I, Duke of Bavaria (Ottonian)	between 939 & 945	954	Burchard III	954	12 November 973 husband's death	26 July 994

† Not to be confused with Hedwig of Bavaria (c.778 to c.835), wife of Count Welf (died c.825) and mother of Holy Roman Empress Judith of Bavaria (died 843)

=== Ottonian dynasty, 973–982 ===
- None

=== Conradine dynasty, 982–1012 ===
Name	Father	Born	Wed	Husband	Became Duchess	Ceased to be Duchess	Died
There is considerable confusion about Conrad's family. The identity of his wife is not known for sure, although he may have been married to a daughter of Liudolf, Duke of Swabia.
Gerberga of Burgundy	Conrad of Burgundy (Elder Welf)	965 or 966	986	Herman II	20 August 997 husband's accession	4 May 1003 husband's death	7 July 1018

=== House of Babenberg, 1012–1038 ===
Name	Father	Born	Wed	Husband	Became Duchess	Ceased to be Duchess	Died
Gisela of Swabia	Hermann II, Duke of Swabia (Conradines)	11 November 995	1012	Ernest I	1012	31 March or 31 May 1015 husband's death	14 February 1043
Adelaide of Susa, Marchioness of Turin	Ulric Manfred II of Turin (Arduinici)	between 1014 and 1020	1035	Herman IV	1035	28 July 1038 husband's death	19 December 1091

=== Salian dynasty, 1038–1045 ===
Name	Father	Born	Wed	Husband	Became Duchess	Ceased to be Duchess	Died
Gunhilde (Kunigunde) of Denmark	Cnut the Great (Denmark)	1020	1036 [betrothed in 1035]	Henry III	1036	18 July 1038	
Agnes of Poitou	William V, Duke of Aquitaine (Ramnulfids)	1025	21 November 1043	Henry III	21 November 1043	7 April 1045 given to Otto II	14 December 1077

=== Ezzonian dynasty, 1045–1047 ===
Name	Father	Born	Wed	Husband	Became Duchess	Ceased to be Duchess	Died
-	Hugh VI, Count of Egisheim	-	-	Otto II	7 April 1045 husband's accession	7 September 1047 husband's death	-

=== House of Schweinfurt, 1048–1057 ===
Name	Father	Born	Wed	Husband	Became Duchess	Ceased to be Duchess	Died
Immilla of Turin (Irmgard)	Ulric Manfred II of Turin (Arduinici)	-	1036	Otto III	January 1048 husband's accession	28 September 1057 husband's death	1078, before 29 April

=== House of Rheinfelden, 1057–1090 ===
Name	Father	Born	Wed	Husband	Became Duchess	Ceased to be Duchess	Died
Matilda of Germany	Henry III, Holy Roman Emperor (Salian)	October 1048	1059	Rudolph I	1059	12 May 1060	
Adelaide of Savoy	Otto, Count of Savoy (Savoy)	1052/53	after June 1066	Rudolph I	after June 1066	1079 son replaced father as Duke	early 1079

=== House of Zähringen, 1057–1090 ===
Name	Father	Born	Wed	Husband	Became Duchess	Ceased to be Duchess	Died
Agnes of Rheinfelden	Rudolf of Rheinfelden (Rheinfelden)	–	1079	Berthold II	1092 husband's accession	1098 husband's renunciation	19 December 1111

=== House of Hohenstaufen, 1079–1208 ===
Picture	Name	Father	Birth	Marriage	Became Duchess	Ceased to be Duchess	Death	Spouse
	Agnes of Germany	Henry IV, Holy Roman Emperor (Salian)	1072	1089		21 July 1105 husband's death	24 September 1143	Frederick I
	Judith of Bavaria	Henry IX, Duke of Bavaria (Welf)	after 1100	1119/21		22 February 1130/31		Frederick II
	Agnes of Saarbrücken	Frederick, Count of Saarbrücken	-	1132/33		6 April 1147 husband's death	after 1147	Frederick II
	Adelheid of Vohburg	Diepold III, Margrave of Vohburg	1122	before 2 March 1147		1152 husband's resignation	1190	Frederick III Barbarossa
	Gertrude of Bavaria	Henry the Lion (Welf)	1152/1155	1166		19 August 1167 husband's accession	1 June 1197	Frederick IV
	Irene Angelina	Isaac II Angelos (Angelos)	1177/81	25 May 1197		1197 husband ceased to be Margrave	27 August 1208	Philip I

=== House of Welf, 1208–1212 ===
Picture	Name	Father	Birth	Marriage	Became Duchess	Ceased to be Duchess	Death	Spouse
	Beatrix of Swabia	Philip of Swabia (Hohenstaufen)	April/June 1198	23 July 1212		1212 husband's deposition	11 August 1212	Otto IV

=== House of Hohenstaufen, 1212–1268 ===
Picture	Name	Father	Birth	Marriage	Became Duchess	Ceased to be Duchess	Death	Spouse
	Constance of Aragon	Alfonso II of Aragon (House of Barcelona)	1179	5 August 1209	1212 husband accession	after 16 July 1216 husband return to Sicily	23 June 1222	Frederick VII
	Margaret of Austria	Leopold VI, Duke of Austria (Babenberg)	1204	29 November 1225		4 July 1235 husband dethroned	29 October 1266	Henry II
	Elisabeth of Bavaria	Otto II Wittelsbach, Duke of Bavaria (Wittelsbach)	1227	1 September 1246		21 May 1254 husband's death	9 October 1273	Conrad III
After the death of Conradin in 1268 Swabia fell into disarray and disintegrating into numerous smaller states.

=== House of Habsburg, 1289–1313 ===
Picture	Name	Father	Birth	Marriage	Became Duchess	Ceased to be Duchess	Death	Spouse
King Rudolph I of Germany attempted to revive it for his son in 1289, the Habsburg dukes were merely titular Dukes of Swabia and the title was abolished in 1313.
	Agnes of Bohemia	Ottokar II of Bohemia (Přemyslid)	5 September 1269	March 1289	1289 husband accession	10 May 1290 husband's death	17 May 1296	Rudolph

== See also ==
- List of Frankish queens
- List of German queens
- List of Austrian consorts
- List of Württembergian consorts

== Bibliography ==
- Heimatverein Waiblingen. Waiblingen in Vergangenheit und Gegenwart, Vols. 4–6.
- Janek, Andreas (2019). Stifts- und Stadwappen von Quedlinburg. Norderstedt.
- Maurer, Helmut (1978). Der Herzog von Schwaben. Thorbecke.
- Schwann, Mathieu (1891). Illustrierte Geschichte von Bayern, Vol. 2. Stuttgart: Süddeutsches Verlags-Institut.
- Vierhaus, Rudolf (2008). Deutsch Biographische Enzyklopädie, 2nd edn. Munich: Saur.
- Zettler, Alfons (2003). Geschichte des Herzogtums Schwaben. Kohlhammer.
- Zotz, Thomas L. (2004). Die deutschen Königspfalzen. Göttingen: Vandenhoeck & Ruprecht.
