= Hedwig of Swabia =

German duchess (died 994)

Hedwig, also Hadwig (* 938/939/940/945; † 28 August 994 on the Hohentwiel) was the wife of Burchard III, Duke of Swabia and was Duchess of Swabia. A daughter of Henry I, Duke of Bavaria and Judith, Duchess of Bavaria, she patronised the formation of the St. George's Abbey, Stein am Rhein in 970.

== Life and work ==
Hadwig was the daughter of the late Bavarian duke Henry I and his wife Judith and she was a niece of the East Frankish Emperor Otto I.

Originally, a marriage with the Byzantine Emperor Romanos I was planned, but this failed due to Hadwig's steadfast refusal.

Hadwig and her husband Burchard III are inextricably linked to the history of Hohentwiel near Singen, as they brought the "Twiel" to its first prosperity by having it expanded into the ducal residence. After Burchard's death, the Twiel became the duchess's widow's residence. The exact location of this first building remains uncertain.

Around 970, the St. Georgen Monastery was founded in the ducal residence. Reichenau Monastery maintained a convent list of the brothers on the Twiel, which has been preserved to this day.

=== Death of the Duke in 973 ===
The marriage remained childless, and Emperor Otto II took advantage of the situation to appoint a new duke according to his own ideas. According to tradition, the widow of a deceased Swabian duke married a member of the local nobility, who then became duke. She was also no older than 34 at the time of Burchard's death in 973. However, the emperor awarded the duchy to the son of his half-brother Liudolf, Otto I of Swabia, who came from the noble Ottonian family.

Hadwig, however, went her own way: In imperial documents of the time, as well as later in the monastic histories (Casus sancti Galli) of the St. Gallen monk Ekkehard IV, the widow is still referred to as dux (duke), even though she lived to see two more legitimate Swabian dukes. She actively intervened in political affairs and also attempted to recommend her teacher and confidant, the monk Ekkehard II of St. Gallen, as tutor for the future King Otto III .

Hadwig had possession of official property and territories from her inheritance from Burchard's will and donated property to monasteries in the surrounding area, which had been disputed since the practice of Emperor Otto I.

According to an older, regional tradition, "apart from various smaller donations [...], only her husband's hereditary property was left to the Duchess to administer freely and undiminished. The villages and valleys of Schleitheim, Beggingen, Brunthofen, Thalen, Schlatt, and Grimmelshofen, once property of the Franconian crown, were designated as the property of the Reichenau Monastery, but with the condition that Duchess Hadewig would retain the use of the same for her entire life."

However, according to tradition, which begins with a visit from Otto I "in August of the year 972 from Italy" and describes the situation after the death of Burchard III in 973, the towns and valleys were in a desolate state - "during the Hunnic invasion and the subsequent period of hardship, everything had been left lying around." This must have been the Hungarian invasion of 954. The Reichenau abbot Witigowo (985-996) succeeded in convincing Hadwig that Reichenau was more capable of rebuilding the valley, and she then ceded "her claims to the monastery."

=== Respect for the old Duchess ===
The article also reflects the beginning of the upheaval under the Ottonians in the principle of awarding territorial property and offices – using the example of the resistance of Hadwig, who still traditionally saw herself as the heir of Alamannia: From "the ancient freedom of the tribes" to the "omnipotence with which the ideas of the feudal system advance." Since this development was still in its infancy at the end of the 10th century, the rulers' consideration for the respected duchess is understandable:

Both Emperor Otto II and the newly appointed Duke of Swabia, Otto I, allowed them to do so.

She subsequently allied herself – as did her sister Gerberga II, abbess of the Gandersheim Abbey – with her younger brother, Duke Henry II of Bavaria, who repeatedly claimed the Swabian ducal title because of Hadwig.

Duke Henry, also known as the Quarreler, was defeated for the second time in 984 when the new Swabian duke, Conrad I, was able to thwart an alliance with the French king in time. With her brother's final defeat, Hadwig also lost political influence.

As late as 994, King Otto III met with Duchess Hadwig and her brother Henry the Quarreler at Hohentwiel to declare his claim to the ducal inheritance.

When Hadwig died in 994, King Otto III personally took care of the estate of the influential duke's widow and traveled to the Twiel, which he most likely made an imperial property, as he had already stayed there again in 1000 to underline his claim.

=== Reception ===
Above all, the relationship between Duchess Hadwig and the monk Ekkehard, whom she brought to live with her on the Twiel, found its way into Romantic literature. Joseph Victor von Scheffel's novel "Ekkehard" is one of the most widely read books of the 19th century.

Johann Joseph Abert created an opera in 5 acts Ekkehard (11 October 1878 Berlin, Court Opera) from this model.

In 1999, Gerhard Zahner’s play Hadwig, Duke of Swabia (directed by Peter Simon) premiered in Singen.

In 1989–1990, the story of the two historical figures was filmed in a six-part television series Ekkehard and broadcast on ARD (originally by Joseph Victor von Scheffel; co-author: Diethard Klante; director: Diethard Klante; production: 1989 André Libik, RB).

== Sources ==
- Otto Feger (ed.): The Chronicle of Petershausen Monastery, Swabian Chronicles of the Staufer Period (= Swabian Chronicles of the Staufer Period. Vol. 3). Thorbecke, Sigmaringen 1978, ISBN 3-7995-6040-8 .
- Ekkehard IV, hist. St. Gallen Association (ed.): Casus Sancti Galli, Vols. XV–XVII.
- Theodor Sickel (Ed.): Diplomata 13: The documents of Otto II and Otto III. (Ottonis II and Ottonis III Diplomata). Hanover 1893 (Monumenta Germaniae Historica, digital copy)

== Literature ==
- Jürgen Dendorfer : Duchess Hadwig on the Hohentwiel – Regional Historical Perspectives for the Early and High Middle Ages. In: Journal for the History of the Upper Rhine 161 (2013), pp. 11–42 (online)
- Karl Schmid: Hadwig. In: Neue Deutsche Biographie (NDB). Volume 7, Duncker & Humblot, Berlin 1966, ISBN 3-428-00188-5, p. 419 (digital copy).
- Hansmartin Schwarzmaier : Hadwig and Ernst II. Images of the Swabian Dukes between Historical Research, Legend, and Poetry. In: Early Medieval Studies , Vol. 36 (2002), pp. 285–315.
- Patricia Tesch-Mertens: Hadwig of Swabia – Was the Duchess a Woman? In: Susanne Blumesberger, Ilse Korotin (eds.): Women's Biography Research. Theoretical Discourses and Methodological Concepts (= BiografiA. New Results in Women's Biography Research. Vol. 9). Praesens-Verlag, Vienna 2012, ISBN 978-3-7069-0676-0, pp. 601–628.
- Alfons Zettler : History of the Duchy of Swabia. Kohlhammer, Stuttgart, 2003, ISBN 3-17-015945-3, pp. 150ff.
