= Adelhard von Burc =

Carolingian prince

- Died: After 1 July 874
- Spouse: Swanaburc
- Issue: Eberhard of Sülichgau
- Father: Eberhard of Friuli
- Mother: Gisela, daughter of Louis the Pious

Adelhard von Burc (died after 1 July 874) was the lay abbot of Cysoing, in what is now France.

== Life ==
He was a son of the Frankish Duke of Friuli Eberhard and his wife Gisela, daughter of Louis the Pious. He was a lay abbot in the Abbey of Saint-Calixte de Cysoing.

He married Swanaburc, by whom he had Eberhard (born c. 856, died after 889) who was count in Sülichgau (also Sülchgau). Eberhard was married to Gisela of Verona. One of his granddaughters through Eberhard was Judith, who married Arnulf, Duke of Bavaria. She was the mother of Eberhard, Duke of Bavaria and Judith, Duchess of Bavaria.

He probably died shortly after 890.
