= Eberhard of Sülichgau =

Frankish nobleman (c. 856 – after 889)

- Born: c. 856
- Died: after 889
- Spouse: Gisela
- Issue: Judith; Regelinda of Zurich, Duchess of Swabia
- Father: Adelhard von Burc
- Mother: Swanaburc

Eberhard von Sülichen (c. 856 – after 889) was a Frankish nobleman, Count of Sülichgau.

It has been reported that he was the son of Unruoch III of Friuli, the Margrave of Friuli, a son of the Frankish Unruoching Duke of Friuli Eberhard of Friuli and of Gisela, daughter of Louis the Pious. It has also been reported that his father was Adelhard von Burc, lay abbot of Cysoing, himself a son of Eberhard of Friuli.

He married his first cousin, Gisela, and they had at least two daughters, Judith (who married Arnulf, Duke of Bavaria, and was the mother of Eberhard and Judith.) and Regelinda of Zürich, Duchess of Swabia.
