= Duchy of Swabia =

Part of Holy Roman Empire, East Francia

Duchy of Swabia Herzogtuom Swaben (Middle High German) Ducatus Allemaniæ (Latin)
- 915–1313
- Arms of the Hohenstaufen dukes (13th century)

- The Duchy of Swabia within the German Kingdom around the start of the 11th century

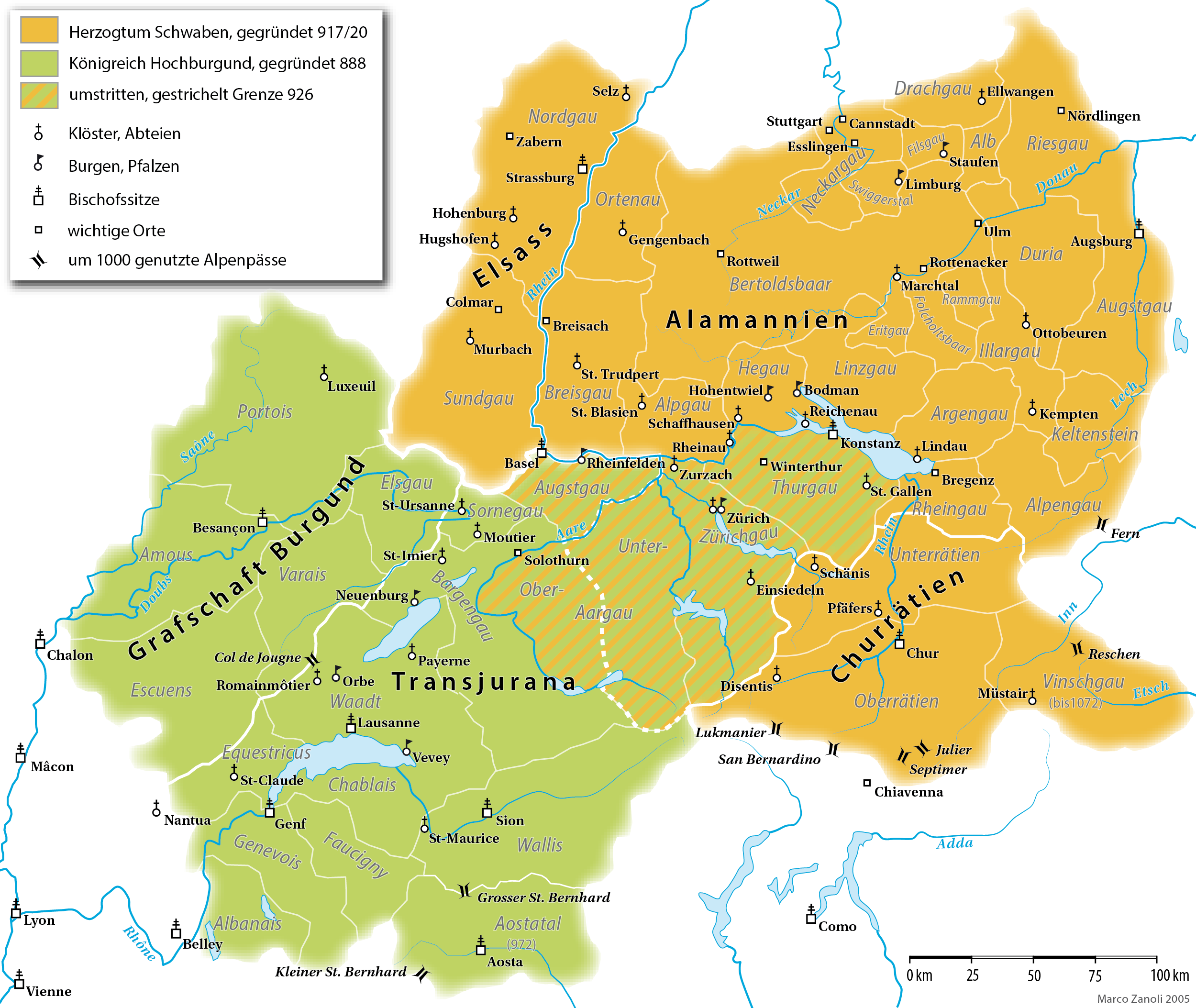
- Map showing the territories of Upper Burgundy (green) and the Duchy of Swabia (orange)
- Status: Stem duchy of East Francia; State of the Holy Roman Empire (from 962)
- Capital: None
- Common languages: Latin; Swabian
- Religion: Roman Catholicism
- Government: Feudal Duchy
- Historical era: Early Middle Ages
  - Proclaimed: 915
  - Duchy discontinued: 1268
  - Duchy resurrected for the Habsburgs: 1289
  - Disestablished: 1313
Preceded by
Alamannia
Succeeded by
County of Württemberg
Old Swiss Confederacy
Margraviate of Baden
Duchy of Burgundy
County of Zollern
Principality of Fürstenberg

The Duchy of Swabia (Middle High German: Herzogtuom Swaben; Latin: Ducatus Allemaniæ) was one of the five stem duchies of the medieval German Kingdom. It arose in the 10th century in the southwestern area that had been settled by Alemanni tribes in Late Antiquity.

While the historic region of Swabia takes its name from the ancient Suebi, dwelling in the angle formed by the Rhine and the Danube, the stem duchy comprised a much larger territory, stretching from the Alsatian Vosges mountain range in the west to the right bank of the river Lech in the east and up to Chiavenna (Kleven) and Gotthard Pass in the south. The name of the larger stem duchy was often used interchangeably with Alamannia during the High Middle Ages, until about the 11th century, when the form Swabia began to prevail.

The Duchy of Swabia was proclaimed by the Ahalolfing count palatine Erchanger in 915. He had allied himself with his Hunfriding rival Burchard II and defeated King Conrad I of Germany in a battle at Wahlwies. The most notable family to hold Swabia were the Hohenstaufen, who held it, with a brief interruption, from 1079 until 1268. For much of this period, the Hohenstaufen were also Holy Roman Emperors.

After a centuries-long struggle with the House of Zähringen, the Margraviate of Baden detached itself from the Swabian duchy in the 12th century. The remaining duchy persisted until 1268, ending with the execution of the last Hohenstaufen duke Conradin. Count Rudolf of Habsburg, elected King of the Romans in 1273, attempted to revive the Swabian ducal title, bestowing it on his youngest son, the later Duke Rudolf II of Austria, who passed it to his son John Parricida. John died without an heir, in 1312 or 1313, marking the end of the "revived" title.

== History ==
=== Alamannia ===
In 496 the Alamanni tribes were defeated by King Clovis I, incorporated into Francia, and governed by several duces who were dependent on the Frankish kings. In the 7th century the people converted to Christianity, bishoprics were founded at Augsburg and Constance, and in the 8th century notable abbeys at Reichenau Island and Saint Gall.

The Alamanni in the 7th century retained much of their former independence, Frankish rule being mostly nominal, but in 709, Pepin of Herstal conquered the territory and in 730 his son Charles Martel again reduced them to dependence. The so-called Blood Court at Cannstatt in 746 marked the end of the old stem duchy, and the Alamanni now came fully under Frankish administration. Charles' son Pepin the Short abolished the tribal duke and ruled Alamannia by counts palatine, or Kammerboten. King Charlemagne married the Alamannian princess Hildegard in 771.

=== Formation of a new duchy ===
At this time the duchy, which was divided into numerous Gaue (counties), took the shape which it retained throughout the Middle Ages. It stretched south of Frankish Austrasia (the later Duchy of Franconia) along the Upper Rhine, Lake Constance, up the High Rhine, and down the Danube to the Lech tributary. The Lech, separating Alamannia from the Duchy of Bavaria in the east, did not form, either ethnologically or geographically, a very strong boundary, and there was a good deal of intercommunion between the two peoples.

By the 843 Treaty of Verdun, Alamannia fell to East Francia. During the later and weaker years of the Carolingian Empire the counts became almost independent, and a struggle for supremacy took place between them and the Bishops of Constance. From about 900, two chief dynasties emerged: the Hunfriding counts in Raetia Curiensis (Churrätien) and the Ahalolfings ruling the Baar estates around the upper Neckar and Danube rivers. Their members were sometimes called margraves and sometimes, as in the case of Rudolf of Rhaetia, dukes. Finally, the Hunfriding count Burchard I was called dux of Alamannia. However, he was killed in 911, for which two Swabian counts palatine, Bertold and Erchanger, were accused of treason. Erchanger proclaimed himself duke in 915, but was put to death by order of the German king Conrad I two years later.

Upon Erchanger's execution, Burchard II, son of the late Burchard I and count in Raetia Curiensis, took the title of duke. Burchard secured his rule by defending the Thurgau region against the claims of King Rudolph II of Burgundy in the 919 Battle of Winterthur. Rudolph II had attempted to expand his Upper Burgundian territory up to Lake Constance by capitalising on the feud between the Ahalolfing and Hunfriding dynasties. He occupied the palace at Zürich and marched into the Thurgau from there. He was defeated by Burchard near Winterthur and was forced to abandon Zürich, retreating beyond the Reuss. Duke Burchard's rule subsequently was acknowledged as such by the newly elected king Henry the Fowler.

=== Younger stem duchy ===
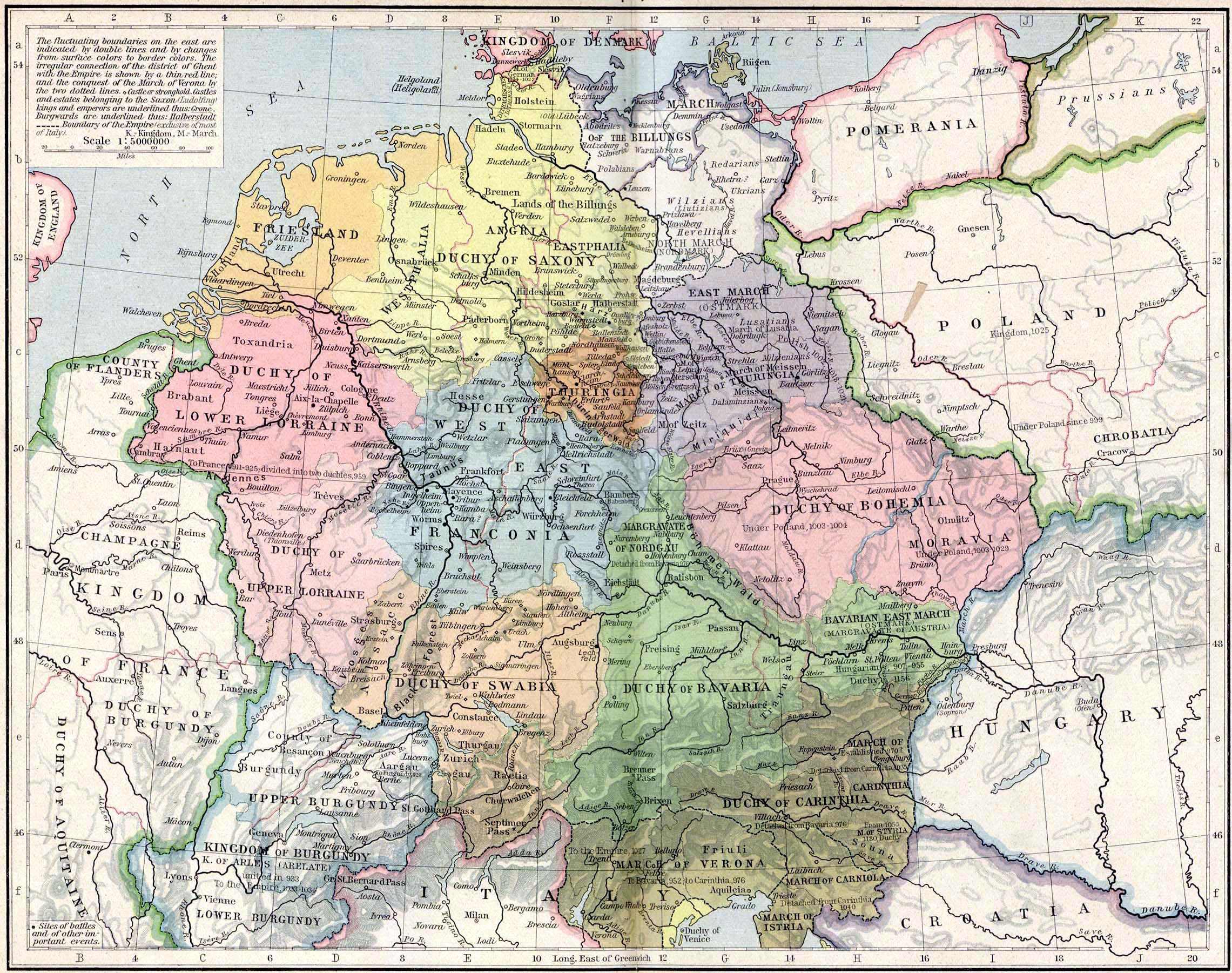
Stem duchies of the German kingdom 919–1125, by William R. Shepherd: Swabia in light orange

Burchard's position was virtually independent, and when he died in 926 he was succeeded by Hermann, a Franconian noble, who married his widow.

When Hermann died in 948 Otto the Great gave the duchy to his own son Liudolf, who had married Hermann's daughter Ida; but he reduced the ducal privileges and appointed counts palatine to watch the royal interests. Liudolf revolted, and was deposed, and other dukes followed in quick succession. Burchard III, son of Burchard II, ruled from 954 to 973, when he was succeeded by Liudolf's son, Otto, afterwards duke of Bavaria, to 982, and Conrad I, a relative of Duke Hermann I, until 997. Hermann II, possibly a son of Conrad, succeeded, and, dying in 1003, was followed by his son Hermann III. During these years the Swabians were loyal to the kings of the Saxon house, probably owing to the influence of the bishops. Hermann III had no children, and the succession passed to Ernest II, son of his eldest sister Gisela and Ernest I, Margrave of Austria. Ernest I held the duchy for his son until his own death in 1015, when Gisela undertook the government, and was married a second time, to Conrad, duke of Franconia, who was afterwards the German king Conrad II. When Ernest came of age he quarrelled with his step-father, who deposed him and, in 1030, gave the duchy to Gisela's second son, Hermann IV and then, on the death of Hermann IV in 1038, to Henry, his own son by Gisela. In 1045 Henry, who had become German king as Henry III, granted Alamannia to Otto, grandson of the emperor Otto II and count palatine of the Rhine, and, in 1048, to Otto III, count of Schweinfurt. Rudolph, count of Rheinfelden, was the next duke, and in 1077 he was chosen German king in opposition to the emperor Henry IV, but found little support in Swabia, which was given by Henry to his faithful adherent, Frederick I, count of Hohenstaufen.

=== Staufer period ===
Frederick had to fight for his position with Bertold, son of Duke Rudolph, and the duke's son-in-law, Bertold II, duke of Zahringen, to whom he ceded the Breisgau in 1096. Frederick II succeeded his father in 1105, and was followed by Frederick III, afterwards the emperor Frederick I. The earlier Hohenstaufen increased the imperial domain in Swabia, where they received steady support, although ecclesiastical influences were very strong. In 1152 Frederick I gave the duchy to his kinsman, Frederick, count of Rothenburg and duke of Franconia, after whose death in 1167 it was held successively by three sons of the emperor, the youngest of whom, Philip, was chosen German king in 1198. During his struggle for the throne Philip purchased support by large cessions of Swabian lands, and the duchy remained in the royal hands during the reign of Otto IV, and came to Frederick II in 1214. Frederick granted Swabia to his son Henry, and, after his rebellion in 1235, to his son Conrad, whose son Conradin, setting out in 1266 to take possession of Sicily, pledged his Swabian inheritance to Ulrich II, count of Württemberg. The duchy fell into abeyance after Conradin's death in 1268.

=== Post-ducal Swabia ===
In 1500 emperor Maximilian I divided the Holy Roman Empire into Imperial Circles. The Swabian Circle was largely coterminous with the stem duchy; however, it excluded Alsace (which was part of the Upper Rhenish Circle), those areas controlled by the Old Swiss Confederacy and Three Leagues (which were unencircled) and the Habsburgs' Further Austrian possessions (originally unencircled; part of the Austrian Circle from 1512). It also included some territory, mostly held by Baden and Württemberg, which had been part of the Franconian stem duchy.

During the dissolution of the Holy Roman Empire the southeastern territories of the Swabian Circle fell to the Kingdom of Bavaria (Bavarian Swabia), while the rest were mostly divided between the Kingdom of Württemberg and the Grand Duchy of Baden, with only the Hohenzollern principalities (Sigmaringen and Hechingen) remaining separate. Since shortly after the end of World War 2, Württemberg, Baden and Hohenzollern have been united as the state of Baden-Württemberg. Although the name Swabia is occasionally used in a general way to denote the district formerly occupied by the duchy, the exact use of the name is now confined to the Bavarian Swabia Regierungsbezirk, with its capital at Augsburg.

== See also ==
- List of Alamannic pagi
- Raetia Curiensis
- Swabian Circle
- Swabia
- Suebi
