= Raetia Curiensis =

Early medieval province in Alps

Raetia Curiensis Churrätien (German) Currazia (Romansh)
- 476–11th century
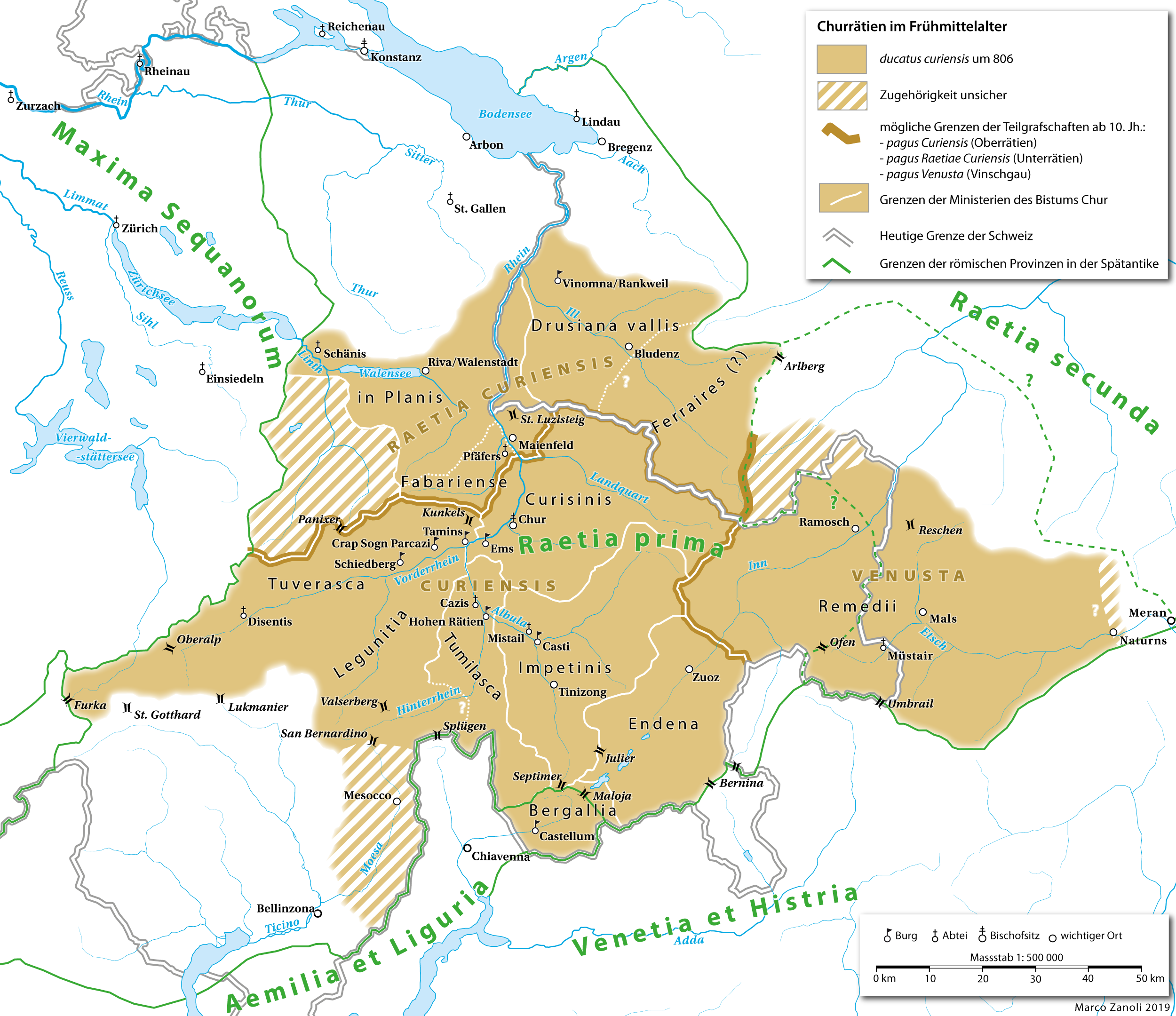
- Map of Raetia Curiensis during the 9th to 11th centuries
- Capital: Chur
- History
  - Raetia prima established: c. 300
  - Ostrogothic rule: 476
  - Frankish rule: 548
  - Subordination to the Duchy of Swabia: 917
  - Division: 11th century
Preceded by
Raetia prima
Succeeded by
County of Bregenz
County of Tyrol
Three Leagues
Prince-Bishopric of Chur

Raetia Curiensis (in Latin; German: Churrätien, Romansh: Currezia) was an early medieval province in Central Europe, named after the preceding Roman province of Raetia prima which retained its Romansh culture during the Migration Period, while the adjacent territories in the north were largely settled by Alemannic tribes. The administrative capital was Chur (Curia Raetorum) in the present Swiss canton of Grisons.

== Location ==
The territory of the province roughly corresponded to modern Grisons (without the southern Misox and Puschlav valleys), plus Liechtenstein, parts of Vorarlberg (the Ill valley with Feldkirch, Damüls, Großwalsertal, and Montafon), as well as the Alpine Rhine valley in the Canton of St. Gallen and adjacent Sarganserland. Until the 12th century, also the Vinschgau region, the valley called Urseren, and possibly Galtür and either parts or all of Glarus belonged to Raetia Curiensis.

== History ==
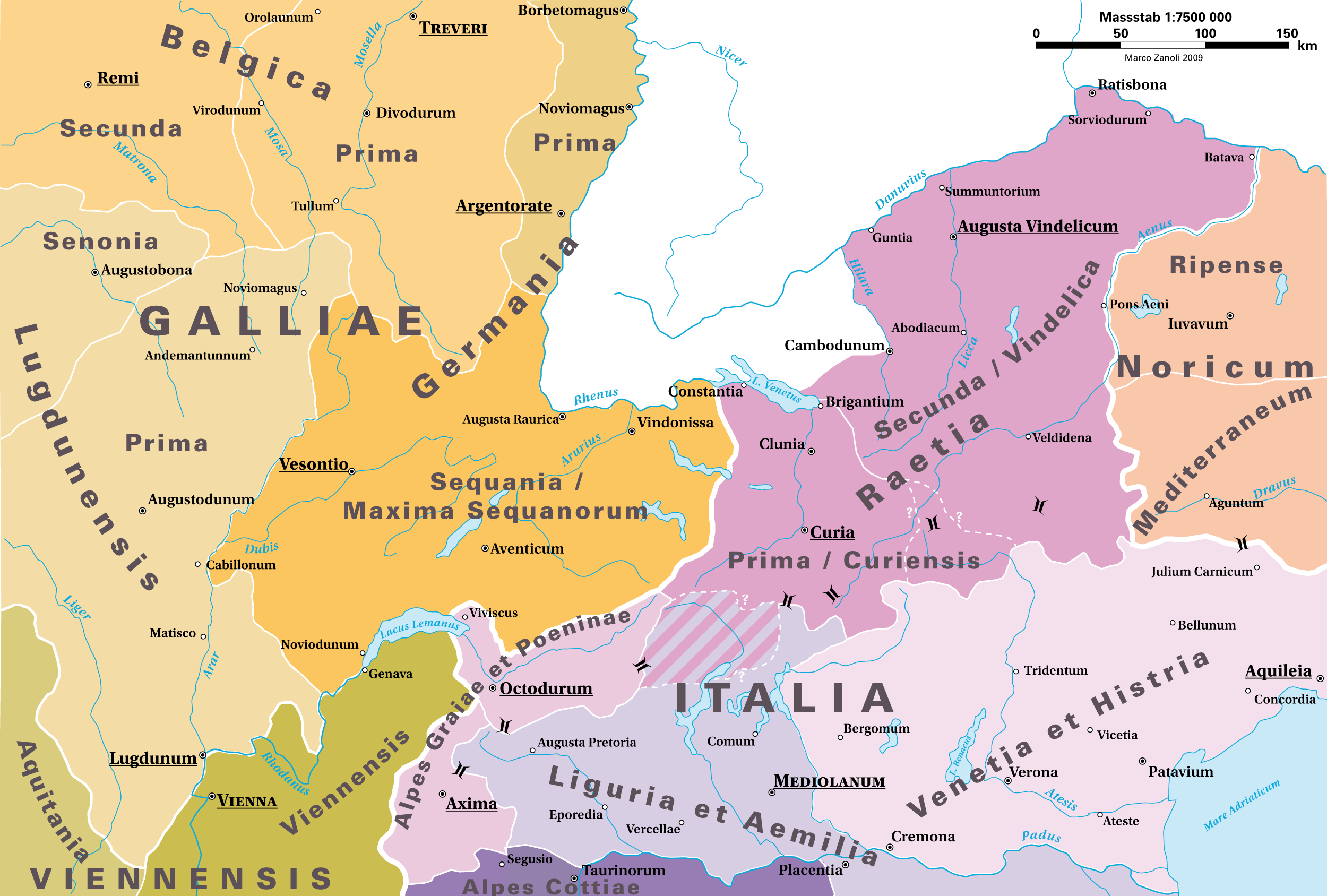
Roman provinces in the Alps, 395 AD

After the Alpine regions were conquered during the campaigns of Emperor Augustus in 15 BC, the lands between the Inn and Danube rivers were incorporated into the Provincia Raetia et Vindelicia, an Imperial province governed by a Senator exercising the functions of a Praetor. The province was divided into the mountainous part of Raetia prima and northeastern Raetia secunda in the Alpine foothills during the reforms enacted by Emperor Diocletian in 297. Both were assigned to the Diocese of Italia under the Praetorian prefecture of Italy and placed under the military authority of a dux. The civil administration was entrusted to lower-ranking praeses officials, who took their seats at Curia Raetorum (Chur) and Augusta Vindelicorum (Augsburg). The northeastern border of Raetia Curiensis with Raetia Vindelica cannot be determined exactly.

During the Christianization in the 4th century, the Bishopric of Chur arose in Raetia Curiensis; a first bishop is mentioned in 451/52. Still under Italian rule during the tenure of King Odoacer, Raetia Curiensis nominally passed to Ostrogothic Kingdom in 493, and King Theoderic the Great again began to appoint dux governors, who however had only military competences, while civil administration remained with a praeses. Nevertheless, it appears that the Chur bishops remained de facto independent rulers.

In 537 King Vitiges had to cede the northern lands up to Lake Constance to the Frankish king Theudebert I in turn for his support in the Gothic War against the Byzantine Empire. Shortly afterwards, by 548, Theudebert expanded his rule over all the Churraetia lands, which finally lost the direct connection to Italy. Nevertheless, though there are only very limited historical sources for the following Merovingian period, the commercial ties with the Italian Kingdom of the Lombards south of the Alps remained vital. It also seems likely that the bishops of Chur still remained in charge as de facto rulers of what was now a remote province on the outer margins of the Frankish kingdom, until in the 740s the Carolingian campaigns against the likewise de facto independent duchy of Alemannia re-attached it to the realm. Several ecclesiastical and secular offices were held by members of the Victorid dynasty. In the mid-8th century a surviving Lex Romana Curiensis, a "Roman Law of Chur", was an abbreviated epitome of the Breviary of Alaric.

After the death of the last Victorid bishop Tello of Chur in 765, King Charlemagne took the occasion to issue a document of protection declaring Tello's successors his vassals. From the 770s onwards, Charlemagne appointed the bishops of Chur himself, increasing Frankish control over the territory. Upon the death of Bishop Remedius in 806 or 807, he legislated a division between episcopal and comital property (divisio inter episcopatum et comitatum), ending the de facto secular rule of the Chur bishops. He appointed Hunfried I comes curiensis (or Reciarum comes), ruling over a vast Imperial demesne. The ecclesiastical (episcopal) and secular (comital) claims to power remained a source of contention.

With Churraetia as a power base, the Hunfriding heirs were able to gather enough power that Count Burchard II was able to proclaim himself a duke of Swabia in 917. At the same time, the former Raetia province was absorbed into the re-established Swabian stem duchy. For this reason, Churraetia remained nominally part of Swabia and by extension of the Holy Roman Empire even though it had not historically been part of Alemannia. Chur suffered several invasions in the 10th century, by the Magyars in 925/6, and by the Saracens in 940 and 954.

In parallel with the development of feudalism in Western Europe, political power became fragmented over the 10th and 11th centuries, and Churraetia was divided into the three counties of Oberrätien, Unterrätien and Vinschgau. In the 12th century, these fell to the counts of Buchhorn, Bregenz and Tyrol, respectively. In the later medieval period, the bishops of Chur regained a certain amount of secular influence, which was however more limited in extent, restricted to the Chur itself, the Domleschg, Engadin, Bergell, Chiavenna, Bormio and Vinschgau.

Raetia as a geographic designation remained in use at the end of the medieval period, when political power passed to the Three Leagues (Drei Bünde) federation. When the Free State of the Three Leagues eventually joined the Helvetic Republic in 1798, the territory was incorporated as the Canton of Raetia. Finally, with the Napoleonic Act of Mediation of 1803, establishing the Swiss Confederacy, the canton was named Grisons (Graubünden).

== Germanic–Latin boundary ==
In contrast to the remaining part of the former province of Raetia, Churraetia managed to retain its Latin character, giving rise to the Romansh language, spoken throughout its territory during the Middle Ages. Raetia prima was occasionally known as Raetia Curiensis even from the 4th century, and the German name Churrätien is simply an adaptation of the Latin name. Historically, it was also known as Churwalchen, Churwahlen in German (walha "Latin/Romance", c.f. Walenstadt). The existence of a medieval German/Latin language boundary at Walensee and the Churfirsten can still be perceived from the prevalence of Latin toponymy.

== See also ==
- Early history of Switzerland

== Sources ==
- A. Baruffi, Spirit of Rhaetia: The Call of the Holy Mountains (LiteraryJoint, Philadelphia, PA, 2020), ISBN 978-1-716-30027-1
- Elisabeth Meyer-Marthaler (1968). Römisches Recht in Rätien im frühen und hohen Mittelalter. Leemann.
- Meyer-Marthaler, Elisabeth (1948). Rätien im frühen Mittelalter. Leemann.
- Reinhold Kaiser (1998). Churrätien im frühen Mittelalter: Ende 5. bis Mitte 10. Jahrhundert. Schwabe. ISBN 978-3-7965-1064-9.
- Lothar Deplazes: "Raetia Curiensis" in German, French and Italian in the online Historical Dictionary of Switzerland.
- Otto P. Clavadetscher: Rätien im Mittelalter. Verfassung, Verkehr, Recht, Notariat. Ausgewählte Aufsätze. Festausgabe zum 75. Geburtstag. Thorbecke, Sigmaringen 1994. ISBN 3799570020
- Ursus Brunold, Lothar Deplazes (Hrsg.): Geschichte und Kultur Churrätiens. Festschrift für Pater Iso Müller OSB zu seinem 85. Geburtstag. Disentis 1986. ISBN 3-85637-112-5
- Sebastian Grüninger: Grundherrschaft im frühmittelalterlichen Churrätien. Dissertation Universität Zürich 2003. Disertina, Chur 2006. ISBN 3856373195
- Wolfgang von Juvalt: Forschungen über die Feudalzeit im Curischen Raetien. Zürich 1871.
