= Judith of Sülichgau =

Duchess of Bavaria

Judith
- Duchess consort of Bavaria
- Born: after 888
- Spouse: Arnulf, Duke of Bavaria
- Issue: Eberhard, Duke of Bavaria; Judith, Duchess of Bavaria
- House: Unruoching
- Father: Eberhard of Sülichgau
- Mother: Gisela of Verona

Judith, Duchess of Bavaria, also Judith im Sülichgau and Judith von Friaul, from the Unrochinger family (born after 888) was a Duchess of Bavaria by marriage to Arnulf of Bavaria.

She married Duke Arnulf in 910. Historians believed she was the daughter of Eberhard of Friuli (d. 866). However, as the dates don't match up, it is now believed that the Unruoching Judith married by Arnulf was in fact the daughter of Count Eberhard of Sülichgau (d. after 889), Eberhard of Friuli's grandson.

Judith and Arnulf's eldest daughter, Judith, married Henry I, Duke of Bavaria, brother of Emperor Otto I, which decisively promoted the integration of Bavaria into the emerging Holy Roman Empire.

As an Unruoching, Judith brought inheritance claims to the Longobard royal crown into the marriage, which Duke Arnulf tried in vain to realize for his son Eberhard in a campaign in Italy in 934.
