= Duke of Swabia =

Rulers of the Duchy of Swabia during the Middle Ages

The Dukes of Swabia were the rulers of the Duchy of Swabia during the Middle Ages. Swabia was one of the five stem duchies of the medieval German kingdom, and its dukes were thus among the most powerful magnates of Germany. The most notable family to rule Swabia was the Hohenstaufen family, who held it, with a brief interruption, from 1079 until 1268. For much of that period, the Hohenstaufen were also Holy Roman Emperors. With the death of Conradin, the last Duke of Hohenstaufen, the duchy itself disintegrated although King Rudolf I attempted to revive it for his Habsburg family in the late 13th century.

== Dukes of Swabia (909–1268) ==
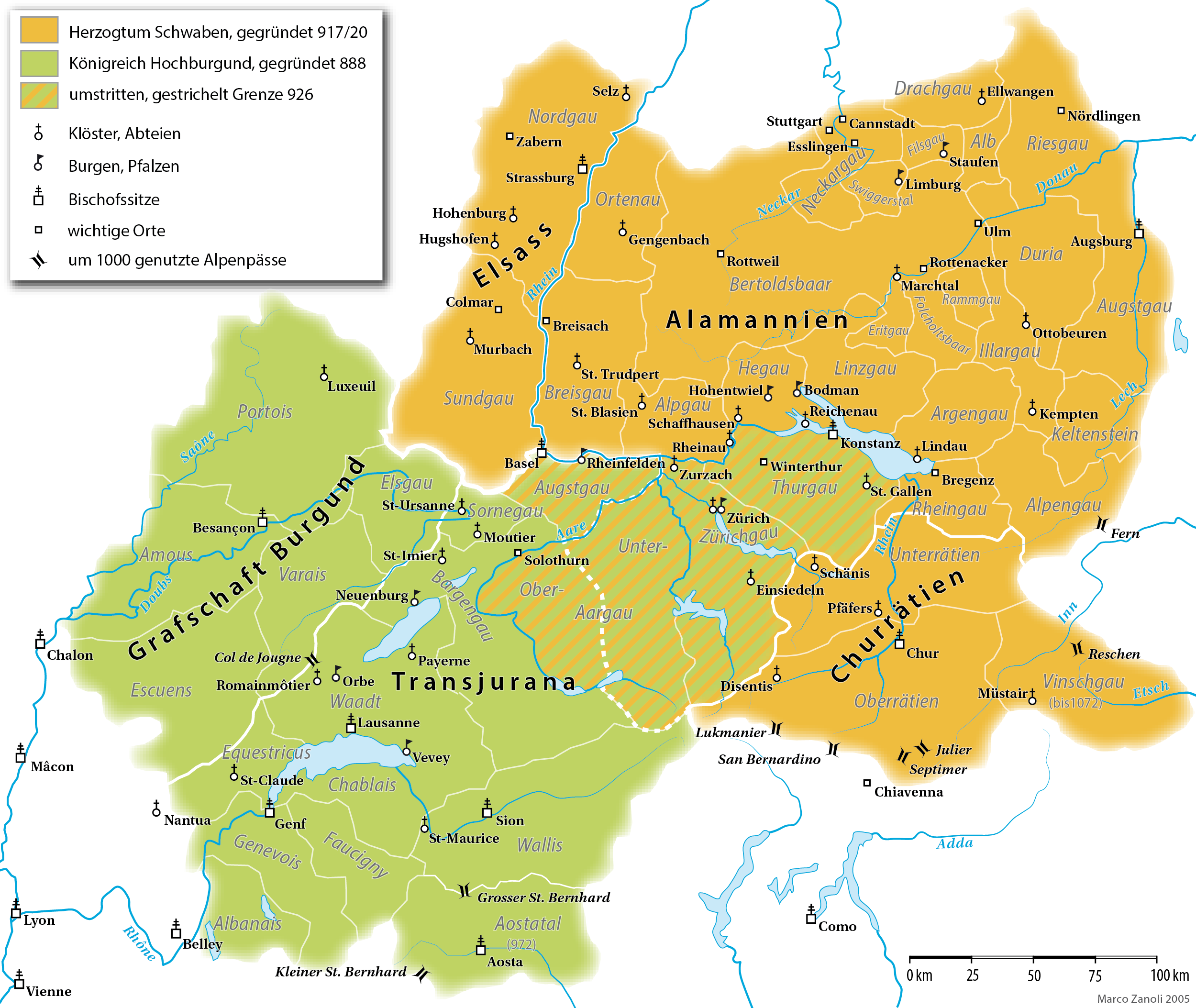
Map of the duchy of Swabia in the tenth and eleventh centuries (Swabia is marked in yellow; the kingdom of Upper Burgundy is green).

=== Early dukes ===
- Burchard I (d. 911), a member of the Hunfridings described as a margrave (Latin: marchio) and duke (dux) of Alamannia in 903 and 909, respectively
- Erchanger, a member of the Ahalolfings, dominant count in Alemannia after the execution of Burchard I, declared duke of Swabia in 915, exiled September 916, executed January 917.
- Burchard II (917–926), a member of the Hunfridings who recognized Henry the Fowler as king of Germany in 919 and was recognized by Henry as Duke of Swabia in return.
- Hermann I (926–949), a member of the Conradines
- Liudolf (950–954), part of the Ottonian dynasty
- Burchard III (954–973), a member of the Hunfridings
- Otto I (973–982), a member of the Ottonian dynasty

=== Conradines ===
- Conrad I (982–997)
- Hermann II (997–1003)
- Hermann III (1003–12)

=== House of Babenberg ===
- Ernest I (1012–15)
- Ernest II (1015–30)
- Hermann IV (1030–38)

=== Miscellaneous houses ===
- Henry I (1038–45), a member of the Salian dynasty, King of the Romans from 1039 and Holy Roman Emperor as Henry III from 1046
- Otto II (1045–48), a member of the Ezzonid dynasty
- Otto III von Schweinfurt (1048–57)
- Rudolf I von Rheinfelden (1057–79), son of a count of Rheinfelden, German antiking 1077–1079
- Berthold I von Rheinfelden (1079–90)
- Berthold II von Zähringen (1092–98), brother-in-law of Berthold I

=== House of Hohenstaufen, 1079–1268 ===
Name	Portrait	Birth	Marriage(s)	Death
Frederick I 1079–1105		1050 son of Frederick of Büren and Hildegard of Egisheim	Agnes of Germany; 1089; 11 children	21 July 1105 aged 54 or 55
Frederick II the One-Eyed; 1105–1147		1090 son of Frederick I and Agnes of Germany	Judith of Bavaria; 1121; 2 children Agnes of Saarbrücken c.1132 2 children	6 April 1147 aged 56 or 57
Frederick III Barbarossa; 1147–1152		1122 son of Frederick II and Judith of Bavaria	Adelheid of Vohburg; 2 March 1147; Eger no children Beatrice of Burgundy; 9 June 1156; Würzburg; 12 children	10 June 1190 aged 67 or 68
Frederick IV; 1152–1167		1145 son of Conrad III of Germany and Gertrude von Sulzbach	Gertrude of Bavaria; 1166 no children	19 August 1167; Rome aged 21 or 22
Frederick V 1167–1170		16 July 1164; Pavia son of Frederick III and Beatrice of Burgundy	unmarried	28 November 1170 aged 6
Frederick VI; 1170–1191		February 1167; Modigliana son of Frederick III and Beatrice of Burgundy	unmarried	20 January 1191; Acre aged 24
Conrad II; 1191–1196		February or March 1173 son of Frederick III and Beatrice of Burgundy	unmarried	15 August 1196; Durlach aged 23
Philip; 1196–1208		August 1177 son of Frederick III and Beatrice of Burgundy	Irene Angelina; 25 May 1197; 4 children	21 June 1208; Bamberg aged 30
Vacancy: 1208-1212
Frederick VII; 1212–1216	Frederick I	26 December 1194; Jesi son of Henry I and Constance of Sicily	Constance of Aragon; 15 August 1209; 1 child Isabella II of Jerusalem; 9 November 1225; 2 children Isabella of England; 15 July 1235; 4 children	13 December 1250; Torremaggiore aged 55
Henry II; 1216–1235	Henry (II)	1211; Sicily son of Frederick I and Constance of Aragon	Margaret; 29 November 1225; 2 children	12 February 1242; Martirano aged 30
Conrad III; 1235–1254	Conrad I	25 April 1228; Andria son of Frederick I and Isabella II of Jerusalem	Elisabeth of Bavaria; 1 September 1246; 1 child	21 May 1254; Lavello aged 26
Conrad IV the Younger; 1254–1268	Conrad II	25 March 1252; Wolfstein son of Conrad I and Elisabeth of Bavaria	never married	29 October 1268; Naples aged 16 (executed)

=== House of Habsburg (1283–1309) ===
- Rudolf (1283–90)
- John (1290–1309)

=== Family tree ===
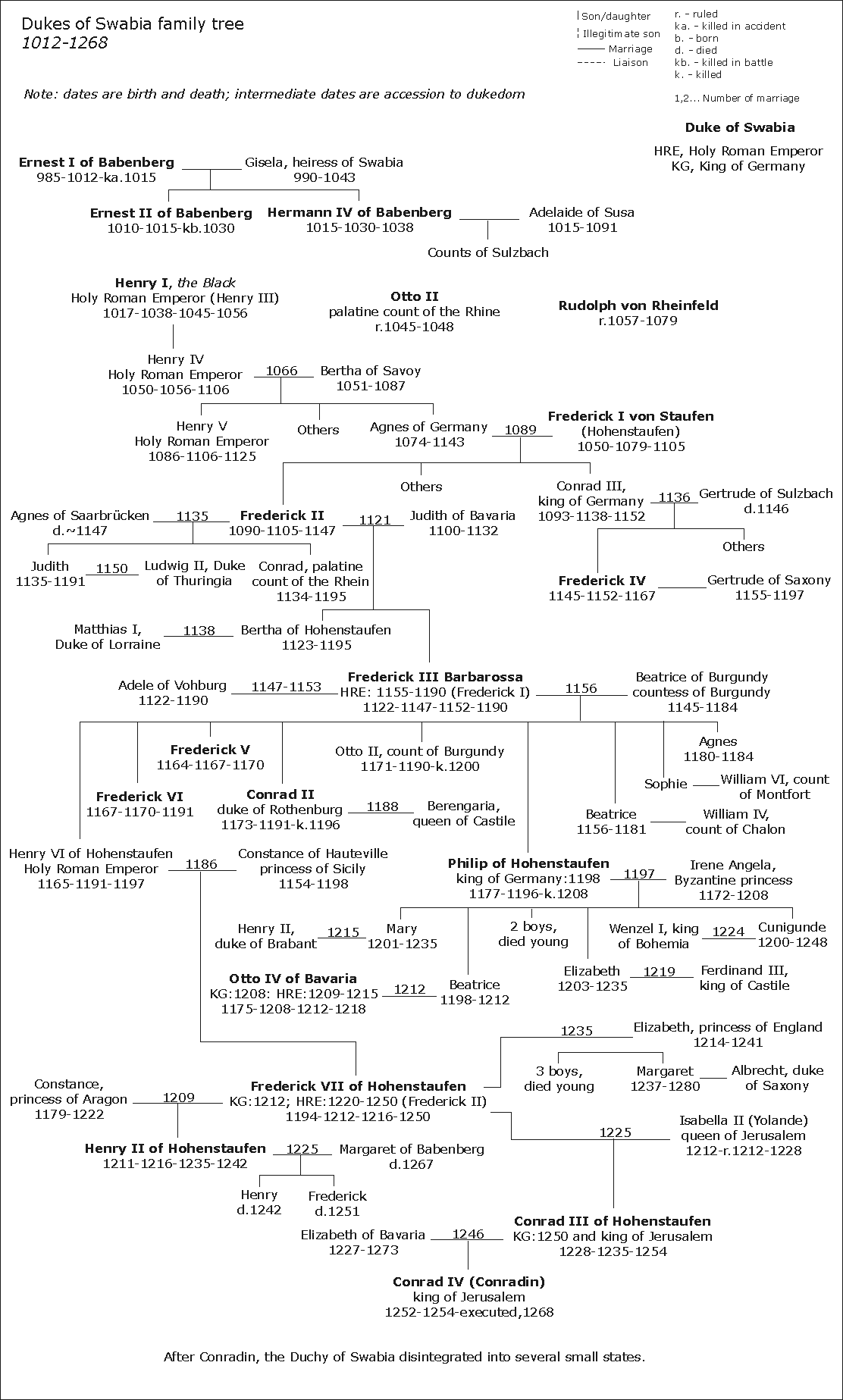

== Successor states ==
In the 13th century, the Duchy of Swabia disintegrated into numerous smaller states. Some of the more important immediate successor states were:

- Bishopric of Augsburg
- Bishopric of Chur
- Bishopric of Constance
- Bishopric of Strasbourg
- Duchy of Teck (to Württemberg)
- Margraviate of Burgau (to Austria)
- Margraviate of Hochberg
- Landgraviate of Klettgau
- Landgraviate of Lower Alsace
- Landgraviate of Sundgau (to Austria)
- Landgraviate of Thurgau (to Austria)
- County Palatine of Tübingen (to Württemberg)
- Abbacy of Disentis
- Abbacy of Murbach
- Abbacy of St. Blaise
- Abbacy of St. Gall
- County of Bregenz (to Austria)
- County of Freiburg (to Austria)
- County of Fürstenberg
- County of Giengen
- County of Heiligenberg
- County of Hohenberg (to Austria)
- County of Kirchberg
- County of Marstetten
- County of Nellenburg
- County of Oettingen
- County of Pfirt (to Austria)
- County of Sulz (to Württemberg)
- County of Werdenberg
- County of Württemberg
- County of Zollern

During the following century, several of these states were acquired by the County of Württemberg or the Duchy of Austria, as marked above. In 1803 Bavarian Swabia was annexed by Bavaria and shortly afterwards became part of the Kingdom of Bavaria.

== See also ==
- Duchess of Swabia
