= Bertha of Swabia =

10th-century Queen of Burgundy and Italy

Queen consort of Burgundy
- Tenure: 922 – 11 July 937

Queen consort of Italy
- Tenure: 922 – 926; 12 December 937 – 10 April 948
- Born: c. 907
- Died: after 2 January 966
- Burial: Payerne Priory
- Spouse: Rudolph II of Burgundy; Hugh of Italy
- Issue: Adelaide, Holy Roman Empress; Conrad I of Burgundy
- House: Hunfridings
- Father: Burchard II, Duke of Swabia
- Mother: Regelinda of Zürich
- Religion: Catholic

Bertha of Swabia (French: Berthe; German: Berta; c. 907 AD – after 2 January 966), a member of the Alemannic Hunfriding dynasty, was queen of Burgundy from 922 until 937 and queen of Italy from 922 until 926, by her marriage with King Rudolph II. She was again queen of Italy during her second marriage with King Hugh from 937 until his death in 948.

== Life ==
Bertha was the daughter of Duke Burchard II of Swabia and his wife Regelinda. In 922, she was married to the Burgundian king Rudolph II. The Welf rulers of Upper Burgundy had campaigned the adjacent Swabian Thurgau region several times, and the marriage was meant as a gesture of reconciliation. With her husband Rudolph, Bertha founded the church of Amsoldingen.

Rudolph died in 937, whereupon Bertha married King Hugh of Italy in what is today Colombier on 12 December 937. This marriage was not a happy one; when Hugh died in 947, Bertha returned to Burgundy.

Between 950 and 960, Bertha founded Payerne Priory, where she was buried. Up to today she is venerated as "Good Queen Bertha" (La reine Berthe) in the Swiss Romandy region, mainly in Vaud, and numerous myths and legends have evolved about her life.

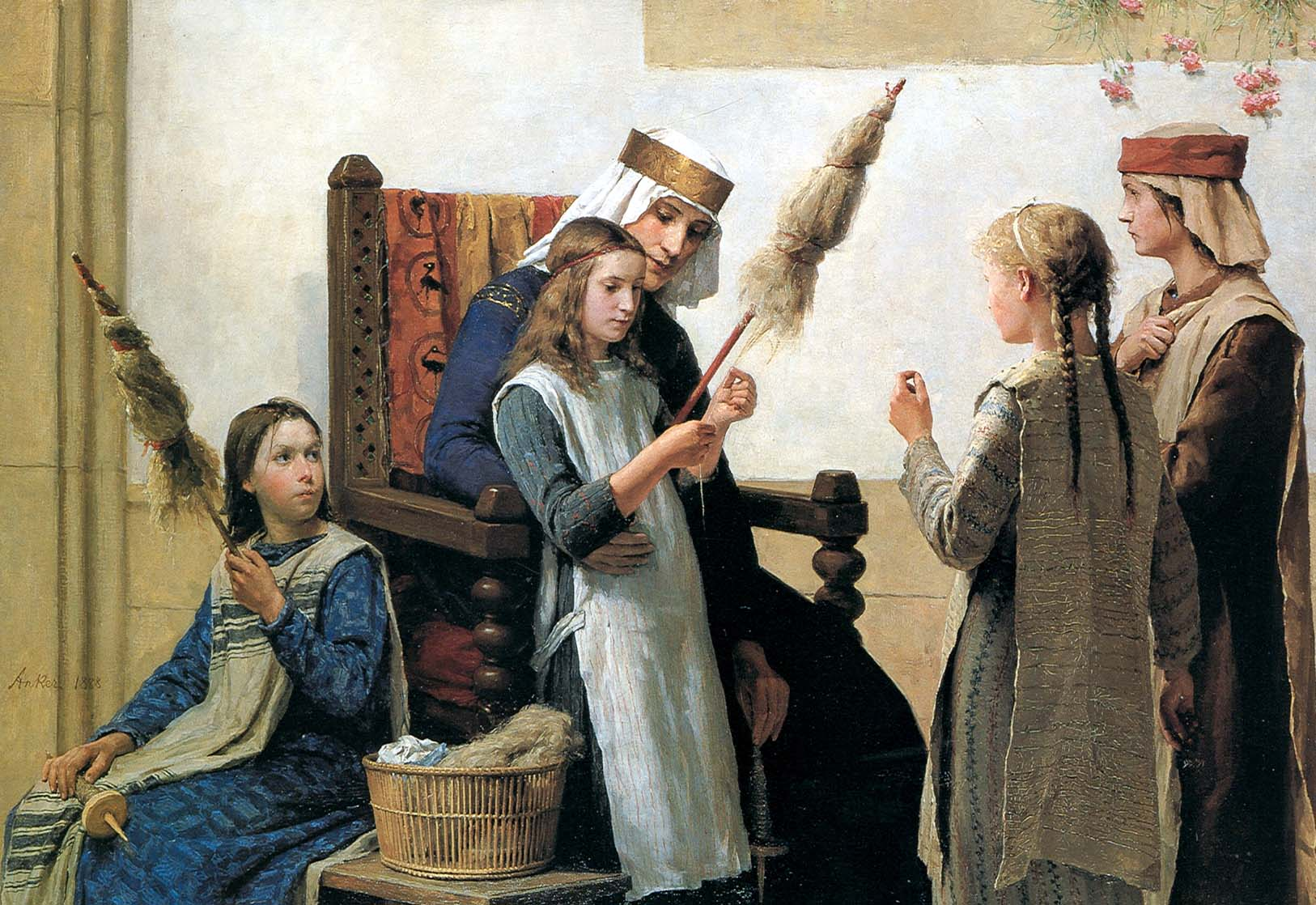
Queen Bertha and the spinners. Painting of 1888.

== Issue ==
Bertha and Rudolph had:

- Adelaide of Italy, who became Holy Roman Empress as consort of Emperor Otto I
- Conrad succeeded as King of Burgundy upon his father's death in 937

== Sources ==
- Duckett, Eleanor Shipley (1967). Death and Life in the Tenth Century. The University of Michigan Press.
- Reuter, Timothy; McKitterick, Rosamond, eds. (1999). "Appendix". The New Cambridge Medieval History: Volume 3, c.900-c.1024. Cambridge University Press.
- Rumpf, Marianne (1977). "The Legends of Bertha in Switzerland". Journal of the Folklore Institute. 14 (3). Translated by Hellenberg, Anthony; Tucker, Elizabeth: 181–195. doi:10.2307/3814073. JSTOR 3814073.
