= Unruoch II of Friuli =

9th Century Duke of Fruili

Unruoch II (also known as Unroch II) (died 853) was a Frankish nobleman and friend of Charlemagne. In particular, he was witness to the emperor's will in 811.

He was the Frankish Duke (Margrave) of Friuli before 846. He may have been the son of Unruoch I of Friuli or Berengar, Count of Friuli. He married Engeltrude (Engletron), daughter of Beggo, Count of Toulouse and had the following issue:

- Eberhard of Friuli, a son, his successor (c. 815-816 – 866), who married Gisela, daughter of Louis the Pious
- Berengar the Wise, a son who was killed in battle (c. 836)
- Amadee of Friuli, a son who became Count of Payn Langres (b. 825)
- Ternois of Friuli, a daughter (b. 825), who married Count Gebhard Nieder-Lahngau
- Alard, Abbot of St. Bertin, a son
- Amadeus, Count of Burgundy, a son (b. 827).
