= Judith, Duchess of Bavaria =

Duchess of Bavaria

Judith
- Duchess consort of Bavaria
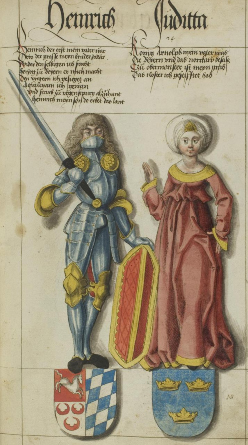
- Henry and Judith of Bavaria, by Lucas Cranach (1546)
- Reign: 947–955
- Predecessor: Biltrude
- Successor: Gisela of Burgundy
- Born: 925
- Died: 29 June after 985; Regensburg, Bavaria
- Burial: Niedermünster Abbey
- Spouse: Henry I, Duke of Bavaria
- Issue: Henry II, Duke of Bavaria; Gerberga II, Abbess of Gandersheim; Hadwig, Duchess of Swabia
- House: Luitpoldings
- Father: Arnulf, Duke of Bavaria
- Mother: Judith of Sülichgau

Judith of Bavaria (925 – 29 June after 985), a member of the Luitpolding dynasty, was Duchess consort of Bavaria from 947 to 955, by her marriage with Duke Henry I. After her husband's death, she acted as regent of Bavaria during the minority of her son Henry the Wrangler in 955-972.

== Life ==
=== Early life ===
Judith was the eldest daughter of the Bavarian duke Arnulf the Bad and, traditionally, Judith of Friuli (although modern scholars point to Judith, daughter of Count Eberhard of Sülichgau). In the emerging Kingdom of Germany, her father tried to maintain the autonomy of his Bavarian stem duchy and entered into several conflicts with King Conrad I as well as with his Ottonian successor Henry the Fowler. According to the Annales iuvavenses, he even proclaimed himself anti-king after Conrad's death in 918, nevertheless he reconciled with King Henry three years later.

Judith's elder brother Eberhard succeeded his father as Bavarian duke in 937 and again picked a fierce quarrel with Henry's son King Otto I. In 938 the king campaigned the Bavarian lands, declared Eberhard deposed and enfeoffed his uncle Berthold as duke. Though Berthold remained a loyal supporter of the Ottonian dynasty, he failed to secure the Bavarian duchy for his minor son Henry the Younger. Instead, King Otto had evolved plans to create a dynastic relation with the Luitpoldings and to install his own brother, Henry I, as duke.

=== Marriage ===
Shortly before her father's death in 937, Judith and Henry I were betrothed, thereby legitimising Henry's claims to the Bavarian throne. Through this matrimonial alliance between the Luitpolding and Ottonian dynasties, the Bavarian duchy entered the growing Kingdom of Germany, and Judith's descent would back the recognition of her husband's rule. Upon Berthold's death in 947, Henry I succeeded him as duke. Judith remained loyal to her husband, even when he was temporarily expelled by the Bavarian nobility during the revolt of his nephew, Duke Liudolf of Swabia, in 953.

=== Regent ===
Judith's son Henry the Wrangler was born in 951. He was a minor when his father fell ill and died in 955, and Judith acted as regent for him. She shared the guardianship with Bishop Abraham of Freising. There was gossip, reported in the chronicle of Thietmar of Merseburg, that the two were sexually involved.

Judith was a capable ruler over the vast Bavarian territories. She often used the masculine title dux (duke). Royal documents usually refer to her as domina (lady), although in one she is dux dominaque (duke and lady). In a letter, Bishop Rather of Verona calls her dux domina (lady duke).

Judith married her daughter Hadwig to Duke Burchard III of Swabia and also arranged the marriage of Henry the Wrangler with Princess Gisela of Burgundy, thereby forging a stable alliance between the South German duchies and the Burgundian kingdom. Judith also fostered good relations with the Ottonian dynasty and Empress Adelaide. According to the medieval chronicler Widukind of Corvey, she was "a woman of exceptional wisdom".

=== Retirement ===
She made a pilgrimage to Jerusalem and, upon returning in 973, had to witness the rebellion of her son and his deposition by Emperor Otto II. She retired to the abbey of Niedermünster in Regensburg, where she is buried beside her husband. Judith was the progenitor of the Bavarian branch of the Ottonian dynasty; her grandson Henry II was elected king in 1002 and crowned Holy Roman Emperor in 1014. Some sources mention a younger, possibly illegitimate son of her husband named Brun, who married and had descendants, though an affiliation with the Brunswick Brunonids has not been conclusively established.

== Sources ==
- Bernhardt, John W. (1996). Itinerant Kingship and Royal Monasteries in Early Medieval Germany, C.936-1075. Cambridge University Press.
- Lenssens, Anke (2024). "Abraham of Freising, a Legendary Bishop (957–994)". In E. Eržen Podlipnik; M. Ferle; H. Janežič; J. Šega (eds.). Škofja Loka 1050: Zbornik Prispevkov z Znanstvenega Posveta Škofja Loka 1050. Občina. pp. 59–81.
