= Payerne Priory =

Monastery in Payerne, Switzerland

Coordinates: 46°49′14″N 6°56′14″E

Payerne Priory (also known as Payerne Abbey, Abbey of Our Lady of Payerne or Peterlingen Priory; Latin: monasterium Paterniacense) was a Cluniac monastery at Payerne, in Vaud, Switzerland. The monastery is a Swiss heritage site of national significance.

== History ==
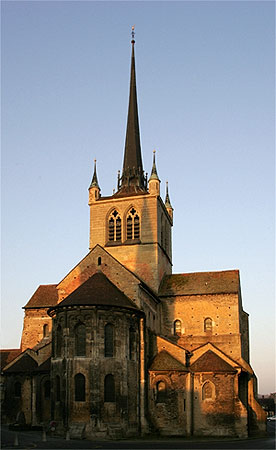
Exterior of the priory church

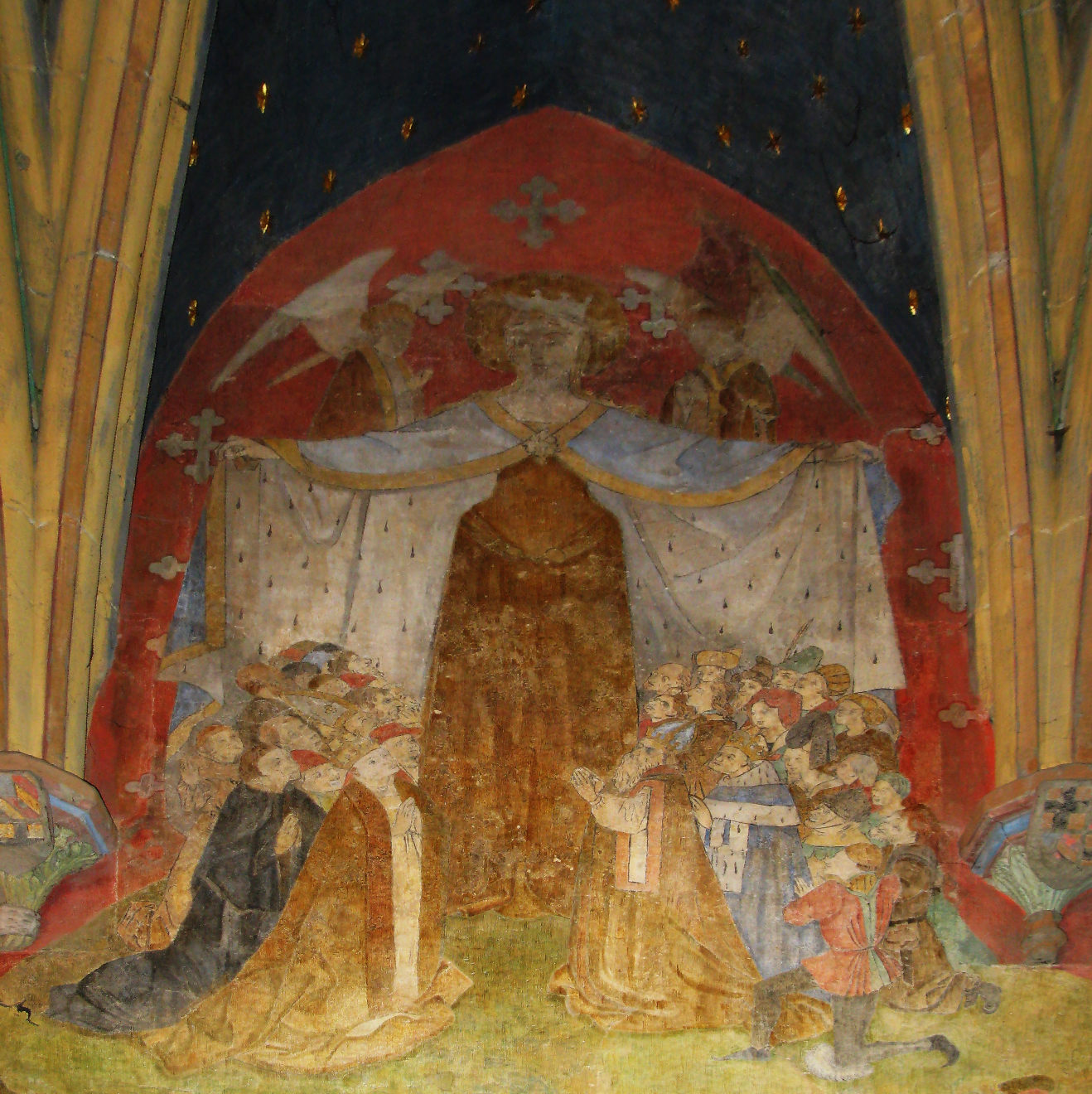
Wall paintings in the priory church

It was founded between 950 and 960 by the Burgundy royal family and especially by Queen Bertha of Burgundy. In 965, the Empress Adelaide placed the priory under Cluny Abbey.

On 2 February 1033, Emperor Conrad II held an assembly, was elected, and crowned King of Burgundy at the abbey.

In the first half of the 12th century, the monks falsified a number of documents as "Testament of Queen Bertha". With the fake documents they appropriated a number rights that they were not entitled to exercise.

The priory was first directly managed by the two abbots from Cluny, Odilo and Maiolus, both of whom lived several times in Payerne. Starting in 1050, Cluny pulled back slightly from directly administering the priory, and the local prior led the monastery with increasing independence. The monks tried, based on the forged documents to gain the freedom to choose their own priors. Although this project failed, they loosened their ties to Cluny Abbey.

The reforming Cluniac, Ulrich of Zell, was prior here in the later 11th century.

From the end of the 13th century, the monastery was in conflict with the city. While the city formally recognized the sovereignty of the prior after the receipt of the town charter in 1348, in fact, he possessed no real power.

Beginning in 1444, the antipope Felix V raised the priory to an abbey. However, this new status was only recognized at the local level and not by their religious superiors or the Roman Curia. This elevation brought no benefits to the monastery. Starting in 1445, it was administered by the Commandry Abbot, who was under the vicar general of Payerne. In 1512 it was brought under the dean of the monastery of Sainte-Chapelle in Chambéry.

The monastery was under the protection of the kings of Burgundy and the Holy Roman Emperor, but the Abbot of Cluny retained the right to choose the kastvogt or ecclesiastical bailiff. The office of kastvogt was first held by the Counts of Burgundy, whose last representative, William IV, was murdered in 1127 in Payerne. After that, it was held by the Zähringers in the early 12th century, followed by the Montagny family, then the Savoys starting in 1240 and after 1282 by the emperor. In 1314 the office of the kastvogt went again to the Savoy family who held the office until the Protestant Reformation. After the reformation, the bailiff was appointed by the Canton of Vaud and a local governor.

The Reformation and the weakening of Savoy power led to the dissolution of the monastery. The nearby cities of Bern and Fribourg began to exercise influence in Payerne and on the priory. The Protestant Bern supported a small community of Reformed citizens, while the catholic Fribourg declared itself the guardian of the monastery. After the Bernese conquest of Vaud, Bern won the upper hand. In 1536 they dissolved the priory and acquired the building of the monastery as well as a portion of its rights and property. Fribourg took in the monks and other catholic believers from Payerne. At the priory, some of the buildings were demolished, the remainder put to various secular uses: a bell foundry in the 17th century, a grain store in the 18th and later as a prison and barracks.

At the end of the 19th century it was placed under protection because of its exceptional cultural value. At the beginning of the 20th century restoration began on the buildings and in 1926 a preservation society was founded to support this work.

== Priory buildings ==
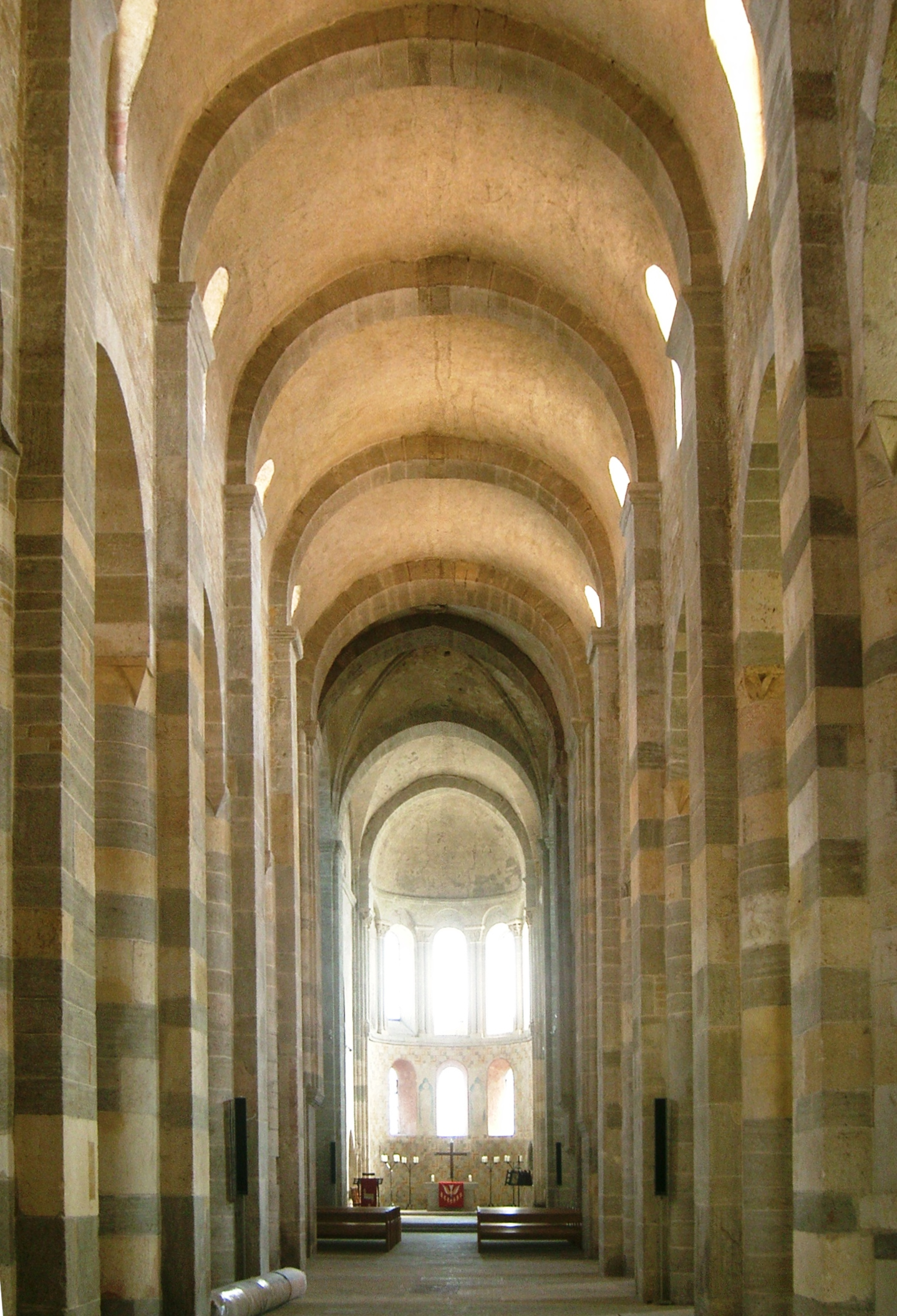
View of the nave looking toward the choir

Archaeological excavations have led to new insights into the first church, which was built in the 10th century. In 960 it was expanded following the model of the Church of Cluny and the entrance hall was extended. A second building phase began in the middle of the 11th century, which brought the church to approximately its current appearance. A new nave was added around 1070-80.

Later, the church received four turrets and a ring of gables around the Gothic bell tower. The interior of the church was decorated with paintings around the entrance in 1200, and to the choir by 1454. Several of the columns are decorated with Roman capitals.

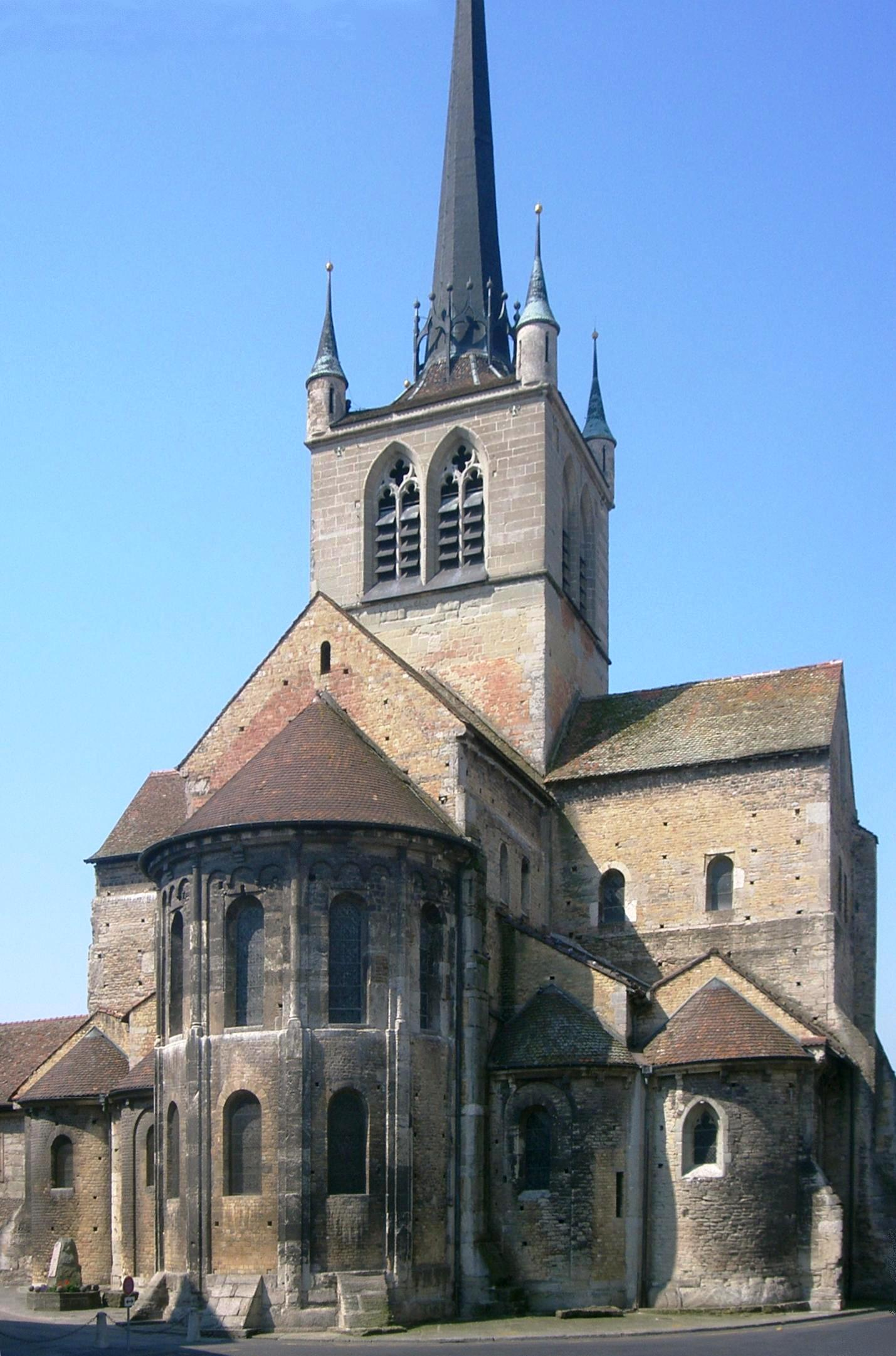

When convent buildings became the seat of the Bernese bailiff in the 16th century, they were converted and renovated on a large scale. Again in the 19th century, they were converted when the buildings were used by the school administration.
