= Burchard I of Swabia =

Hunfriding Duke of Swabia (c. 850 – 911)

Burchard I, Duke of Swabia
- Successor: Burchard II of Swabia
- Born: c. 850/855
- Died: 5 or 23 November 911
- Noble family: Hunfridings
- Spouse: Liutgard of Saxony (possibly)
- Issue: Burchard II
- Father: Adalbert II the Illustrious
- Mother: Judith of Friuli

Burchard I (c. 850/855 – 5 or 23 November 911), a member of the Hunfriding dynasty, was a Duke of Swabia or Alamannia from 909 until his death. He also held the title of a margrave of Raetia Curiensis, as well as count in the Thurgau and Baar.

== Life ==
Burchard was the son of Adalbert II the Illustrious, Count of Thurgau, and his wife Judith of Friuli. By 900, Burchard was already the most powerful noble in Alamannia. In a 904 deed, he appeared as Vogt administrator of the Swabian possessions of Lorsch Abbey. He succeeded the Welf scion Ruadulf in the borderlands of Raetia, mentioned as marchio (margrave) in 903 and dux (duke) in 909.

To further increase his influence, Burchard entered into a conflict with the Swabian count palatine Erchanger and Bishop Solomon III of Constance, who both were loyal supporters to the later East Frankish king Conrad I. In turn, Burchard was captured and charged with high treason. He was found guilty by a tribal council and executed, (Note: According to Eckhard Muller-Mertens, Burchard was murdered.) along with his brother, Count Adalbert III of Thurgau.

His son, Burchard II, and his daughter-in-law, Regelinda, left for Italy, either exiled or taking refuge. Their Rhaetian estates were lost, though later recovered. Count Palatine Erchanger proclaimed himself Duke of Swabia in 915.

== Issue ==
About 882 Burchard married one Liutgard (possibly the Ottonian princess Liutgard of Saxony, widow of King Louis the Younger) and had the following children:

- Burchard II (d. 926), succeeded as Duke of Swabia in 917
- Dietpirch of Swabia (also known as Theoberga) married Hupald of Dillingen (d. 909).
- Odalric, count in the Thurgau and Zürichgau, had issue.

== Sources ==
- Jackman, Donald C. (2008). Ius hereditarium Encountered II: Approaches to Reginlint. Editions Enplage.
- Muller-Mertens, Eckhard (1999). Reuter, Timothy; McKitterick, Rosamond (eds.). The New Cambridge Medieval History: Volume 3, C.900-c.1024. Cambridge University Press.
- Reuter, Timothy (1991). Germany in the Early Middle Ages C. 800-1056. Routledge.
- Riche, Pierre (1993). The Carolingians: A Family Who Forged Europe. Translated by Allen, Michael Idomir. University of Pennsylvania Press.
- Leyser, Karl. Communications and Power in Medieval Europe: The Carolingian and Ottonian Centuries. London, 1994.

Burchard I of Swabia Hunfridings Born: c. 850/55 Died: 5 or 23 November 911
Regnal titles
Preceded by Zwentibold	Duke of Alamannia; 909–911	Succeeded by Erchanger
