= Eberhard of Friuli =

Frankish Duke of Friuli

Eberhard (c. 815 – 16 December 867) was the Frankish Duke of Friuli from 846. His name is alternatively spelled Everard, Evrard, Erhard, or Eberard; in Latinized fashion, Everardus, Eberardus, or Eberhardus. He wrote his own name "Evvrardus". He was an important political, military, and cultural figure in the Carolingian Empire during his lifetime. He kept a large library, commissioned works of Latin literature from Lupus Servatus and Sedulius Scottus, and maintained a correspondence with the theologians and church leaders Gottschalk, Rabanus Maurus, and Hincmar.

== Family ==
Eberhard was from an illustrious Frankish family, though his parentage is debated. His marriage to Gisèle, the daughter of Emperor Louis the Pious, cemented his eminent position at the Frankish court.

=== Children (with Gisela, daughter of Louis the Pious) ===
Caption
Name	Date of birth	Date of death	
Eberhard	815	867	
Gisèle	820	863	
Ingeltrude	837 or 840	April 870	possibly married Henry, Margrave of the Franks and grandmother of Henry the Fowler
Unruoch III	c. 840	874	
Bèrenger	c. 845	924	King of Italy
Adélard	–	874	
Rudolf	–	892	
Heilwise	860	–	
Judith of Friuli	–	c. 881	first married Arnult I of Bavaria, second married Conrad II of Auxerre.

=== Disputed parentage ===
Paternity theories

- His father was Unruoch II.
- "His father was Berengar, the son of Count Unroch."
- "After other authors, Unroch, the grandfather of Saint Evrard, should have been the Duke of Frioul."
- "Alas, some have written that Saint Evrard had for his father Carloman I, the brother of Charlemagne."
- "His grandfather was, it is said, the Count Unroch who was leaving the court of Charlemagne and signatory to the will of the emperor."

Maternity theories

- His mother was Engeltron of Paris, a daughter of Begue, Count of Paris.
- "As for his mother, she was, Buzelin says, the daughter of Didier, king of the Lombards."

== Education ==
Although a layman, Eberhard was not only literate but possessed an extensive library, which is detailed in his will. He acted as a patron for the theologian and heretic Gottshalk of Orbais.

== Warlike exploits and role as mediator under Louis the Pious ==
As soon as his age permitted him to carry arms, Eberhard took part in numerous military expeditions. Named Duke of Friuli and Count or Marquis de Trévise, in Italy, he defended his country against invasion by the Bulgars and managed to completely drive them from the peninsula—825-830.

He rendered service unto Louis the Pious that was still more distinguished. During the tragic years (830-839) where the emperor had suffered at the hand of his son's revolt the most undignified treatment, Count Eberhard remained inviolably loyal. He exercised his influence in Lothair's sphere (the elder son of the emperor) to bring about a reconciliation between father and son. It is certain that it was on his counsel in 839 that Lothaire went to Worms to implore the pardon of his father.

== Marriage and life at Cysoing ==
In return for his services, the emperor Louis the Pious gave Count Evrard the highest honor possible: the hand of his daughter by his wife Judith of Bavaria, the Princess Gisèle, in marriage.

Gisèle was a woman of piety and virtue. Among the rich domains the Princess brought with her in her dowry, Count Evrard found the fisc of Cysoing. One gives the name fisc, in this age, to large, rural properties separate from the royal domains; that is, to sorts of farms with a residence for the master and homes for settlers. The Royal Fisc of Cysoing, situated at the center of the country of Pèvele, was one of the most beautiful in the region. The stay seemed so agreeable to Saint Evrard and the Princess Gisèle that they made it one of their regular residences.

Already, in the century before (in 752), the little hamlet established on the royal fisc of Cysoing has been made famous through the martyrdom of Saint Arnoul. Saint Arnoul, a courageous warrior, who was, it is said, the father of Godefroid, Bishop of Cambrai-Arras, had been attached to the court of a noble lord, his relative. "His virtues and his merits were so radiant that God accorded his prayers more than one miracle during his life. He became even more glorious through his martyrdom." He was so devoted to his master that he eventually died for him thus attaining martyrdom. Saint Arnoul was already honored at Cysoing when Saint Evrard and Princess Gisèle went to take possession of their domain. His relics were conserved there. Cysoing therefore had a church, or less a chapel that was without doubt the same chapel as the royal fisc.

Saint Evrard, at Cysoing, had a chaplain named Walgaire. They (Evrard and Gisèle) decided to found a monastery at Cysoing. The project was long and difficult, and was not complete at the time of Evrard's or Gisèle's deaths. The monastery was initially made in honor of Saint Saveur and Mary (mother of Jesus). The religious lived there under canon law in a community with all the rigors of the cloister. Their special function was singing solemnly in the church. They maintained public prayer. Saint Evrard was known to enjoy singing with the choir. After his later campaigns in the defense of Italy, the remains of Pope Callixtus I were re-interred in the Abbey at Cysoing.

== Character ==
Eberhard organized his home in a way so perfectly that it was more like a monastery than a castle. He was seconded in this task by his pious wife, Gisèle, who dedicated herself to the education of their many children. The poor and ill were sure of finding not only security at Cysoing, but also help and protection. The social question of the time, that of serfs, also preoccupied Saint Evrard. He had freed a good number. In their testimony, he expressly refrained from impeding their liberty. He never forgot those who he didn't free, and tried to improve their lots. Though he was a courageous and formidable, he worked all his life for peace. His private virtues were no less remarkable. In his elevated position, he strove to preserve modesty and humility, to avoid splendor and arrogance. His zeal for the glory of God, to spread the Truth, to convert the infidels, was celebrated throughout the Church. Also, his piety, his taste for ceremonies of worship, his devotion to the saints, and his respect for the precious relics was apparent in his every act.

== Pacifier ==
Eberhard's activity was not limited to the royal fisc of Cysoing, as he involved himself freely with matters of other domains and the empire in general. Emperor Louis the Debonaire went to die (840) and the war, a cruel war without mercy, exploded between the Emperor Lothaire and his two brothers, Louis the German and Charles the Bald. Eberhard strongly deplored this fighting/battling and fratricide and made all efforts to bring it to an end. After the bloody battle of Fontenay (25 June 841), he left the ambassadorial envoy of Lothaire near that of Lothaire's brothers for peace negotiations. The preparatory conference took place in 842 at Milin, near Châlons in Champagne. It was decided to divide the empire between the three brothers. The negotiators, among which Evrard could be found, were charged with making the partitioning equitable/fair. It was not before August 843 that they presented their report to the three kings at Verdun.

== Wars with the Saracens ==
The negotiations ended and peace was re-established between the three brothers, Saint Evrard left in haste for Italy. Italy was under threat from "African Saracens". These Saracens had been named as helpers, in 842, by the Duke of Benevento and they would soon become a threat to regimes throughout the peninsula. They menaced Rome and pillaged it many times. Saint Evrard, in his position as Duke of Friuli, was made a captain/leader of the resistance. The war wore on for several years and ended in 851 with the defeat of the Saracens.

"Evrard has a reputation for being both a courageous soldier and able leader throughout these battles. In the tradition of Charlemagne, Evrard forced the vanquished to convert to Christianity, meritoriously teaching them the Gospel, himself."

== Testament and death ==
Sometime after this solemnity, Eberhard returned to Italy. We find him in 858 among the ambassadors whom the emperor Louis the Younger, son of Lothaire, sent to Ulm, near his uncle Louis the German. After this date, we know nothing more about Eberhard until his testament or will, whose authenticity is certain and in which we are given information on the life of Eberhard. This will was made in Italy, at Musiestro Castle, in the county of Trévise, in 867. Eberhard and his consort meticulously recorded not only their lands and possessions within a prepared will, but the identities and relationships of family members and neighboring royals. With the agreement of his spouse, Gisèle, Eberhard portioned his goods among his seven children.

The eldest, Unroch, got all properties in Lombardy and Germany. The second, Berengar, got Annappes with its dependencies less Gruson and the other properties in the Hesbaye, of and in the Condroz. The third, Adélard, got the lands of Cysoing, Camphin, Gruson and Somain, with charges and respects of all the properties of the Abbey in these regions. The fourth, Rodolphe, got Vitry-en-Artois and Mestucha, except for the church at Vitry which was given with the Abbey at Cysoing.

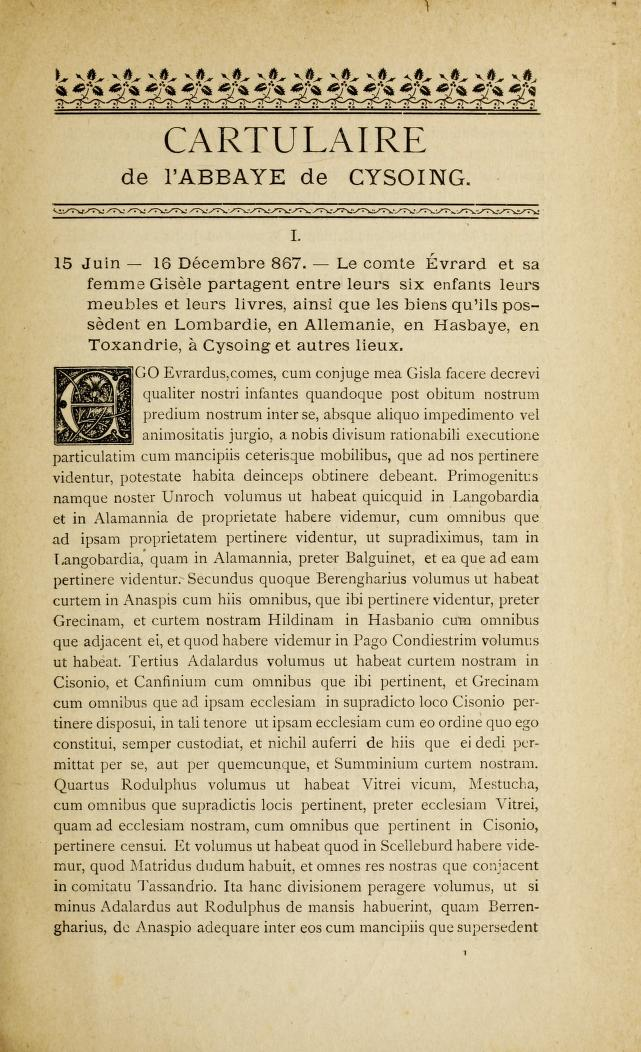
Cysoing's first charter page 1

The three daughters of Eberhard, Ingletrude, Judith and Heilwich, got various other domains : Ermen, Marshem, Balghingham, Heliwsheim, Hostrenheim, Luisinga, Wendossa, Engerresteim. Eberhard had another daughter who carried the name of Gisèle, her mother. But she was dead at the time of his testimony. The testimony split equally the jewels and ornaments of the saint, the precious objects of his chapel and the books of his library. It is dated 867, the 24th year of the reign of Lothaire's son, Louis the Younger. Eberhard died the same year, 16 December.

== Canonization ==
Saint Eberhard of Friuli
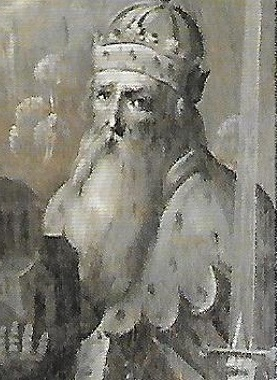
- Born: 815
- Died: December 16 867
- Venerated in: Catholic
- Feast: December 16

Eberhard was later canonization as a saint, and his feast day is on 16 December.

== Sources ==
- Theuws, Frans (2000). Rituals of Power: From Late Antiquity to the Early Middle Ages,503 pages/page 225, Christina La Rocca and Luigi Provero, THE DEAD AND THEIR GIFTS: THE WILL OF EBERHARD, COUNT OF FRIULI, AND HIS WIFE GISELA, DAUGHTER OF LOUIS THE PIOUS. Brill.
- Morby, John (1989). Dynasties of the World: a chronological and genealogical handbook. Oxford University Press.
- Louda, Jirí; MacLagan, Michael (1999). Lines of Succession: Heraldry of the Royal Families of Europe, 2nd edition. Little, Brown and Company.
