= Unruoch III of Friuli =

- Margrave of Friuli
- Born: c. 840
- Died: 874, after 1 July
- Spouse: Ava
- Issue: Eberhard; Gisela; Berengar
- Father: Eberhard of Friuli
- Mother: Gisela, daughter of Louis the Pious

Unruoch III, Unroch III or (H)unroch III (c. 840 – 874, after 1 July) was the margrave of Friuli from 863 to 874. He was the oldest son of Eberhard of Friuli and Gisela, daughter of Louis the Pious, son of Charlemagne. He married Ava, a daughter of Liutfrid of Monza, by whom he had two sons, Eberhard of Sülichgau and Berengar (born in 888), both of whom were counts in Alemannia, and at least one daughter, Gisela, the mother of Regelinda.

== Sources ==
- Andreas Bergomatis, Chronicon at the Institut für Mittelalter Forschung.
