= Arnoul of Cysoing =

Saint Arnoul of Cysoing, of Flanders, and apparently martyred in 752, was a soldier.
