= Buzelin =

Buzelin بوزلين
- Village
- Location within Iran
- Coordinates: 36°24′49″N 49°56′16″E
- Country: Iran
- Province: Qazvin
- County: Qazvin
- Bakhsh: Central
- Rural District: Eqbal-e Gharbi

Population (2006)
  - Total: 84
- Time zone: UTC+3:30 (IRST)
  - Summer (DST): UTC+4:30 (IRDT)

Buzelin (Persian: بوزلين, also Romanized as Būzelīn, Bezūlīn, and Bizulin) is a village in Eqbal-e Gharbi Rural District, in the Central District of Qazvin County, Qazvin Province, Iran. At the 2006 census, its population was 84, in 22 families.
