= Judith (daughter of Eberhard of Friuli) =

Frankish noblewoman

- Born: c. 838
- Died: 863
- Spouse: Liuto von Rheinau
- Issue: Gisela; Berengar; Eberhard
- Father: Eberhard of Friuli
- Mother: Gisela, daughter of Louis the Pious

Judith, also referred to as Judith von Balingen or Judith von Friaul, was a Frankish noblewoman, the daughter of Eberhard of Friuli, Duke of Friuli, and Gisela, daughter of Louis the Pious.

Judith was a granddaughter of Louis the Pious and great-granddaughter of Charlemagne. She was the mother of Gisela, and grandmother of Regelinda of Zürich, Duchess of Swabia. She received the town of Balingen by testament.

Other sources indicate that a Judith, daughter of Eberhard and Gisela, died in 881 and married Conrad II, Duke of Transjurane Burgundy.
