= Herman I of Swabia =

Duke of Swabia

Herman I (died 10 December 949) was the first Conradine Duke of Swabia (from 926), the son of Gebhard, Duke of Lorraine, and a cousin of King Conrad I of Germany.

When duke Burchard II died at Novara, while campaigning in Italy, King Henry the Fowler gave the duchy to Herman. By investing the duke at a reichstag at Worms, the king clearly demonstrated that he, not the tribal noblesse, had the right to appoint the duke. Herman married Regilinda, the widow of Burchard.

Only once during his reign did Herman face a rebellion by his vassals, but he was also forced several times to make concessions in Switzerland. Sankt Gallen was given over to the direct protection of the king and the duke lost the use of its lands and incomes. By his control over the Alpine passes into Burgundy and Italy, he dutifully served Ottonian interests in these realms. At Worms in 950, after Herman's death, Otto I, Holy Roman Emperor appointed his son Liudolf, who had, in 947 or 948, married Herman's daughter Ida (died 17 May 986), duke.

Aside from being duke, Herman was from 939 count in Langau, from 948 count in Auelgau, and from 947 lay abbot of Echternach. He founded the church of St Florin in Coblenz and was buried at the monastery on Reichenau Island on Lake Constance.

== Sources ==
- Reuter, Timothy, ed. (2006). The New Cambridge Medieval History, c.900-c.1024. Vol. III. Cambridge University Press.
- Thietmar von Merseburg (2001). Ottonian Germany: The Chronicon of Thietmar of Merseburg. Translated by Warner, David A. University of Manchester Press.

Regnal titles
Preceded by Burchard II	Duke of Swabia; 926–949	Succeeded by Liudolf
