= Fisc =

Feudal land subject to taxation by the royal household

Under the Merovingian and Carolingian dynasties of Francia, the fisc (from Latin fiscus) applied to the royal demesne which paid taxes, entirely in kind, from which the royal household was meant to be supported, though it rarely was. Though their personal territory was at first enormous, the Merovingian kings, faced with stiff resistance to taxation from their Frankish and Gallo-Roman subjects and ill-served by their illiterate peers, relied on constant conquests to renew the fisc which they were in the habit of granting away to ensure continued fidelity among their followers. Once fresh Frankish conquests were no longer forthcoming, constant redivision of the "fisc" among heirs reduced Merovingian kingship to a cluster of competitive kinglets subsisting on inadequate resources. Annual contributions in kind, of grain, produce, fodder, etc., were unwieldy to transport and not easily convertible, so the habit of Merovingian kings moving from stronghold to stronghold was constantly encouraged. As time passed, "fisc" began to refer to money any Frankish knight had direct control over and would carry with him. Eventually, "fisc" referred to any knight's money holder.

Nowadays, "fisc" is still used in French, in Catalan, and in Romanian to refer to the fiscal administration. In Spanish and in Portuguese, the slang word "fisco" is also used, while the German term is "Fiskus" and the Dutch term is "fiscus".
