= Burchard II of Swabia =

Hunfriding Duke of Swabia

Burchard II, Duke of Swabia
- Successor: Burchard III
- Born: 883 or 884
- Died: 29 April 926
- Noble family: Hunfridings
- Spouse: Regelinda of Zürich
- Issue: Bertha of Swabia Burchard III
- Father: Burchard I, Duke of Swabia

Burchard II (883/884 – 29 April 926) was the Hunfriding Duke of Swabia, also called Alemannia (from 917) and Count of Raetia. He was the son of Burchard I of Swabia.

Burchard took part in the early wars over Swabia. His family being from Franconia, he founded the convent of St Margarethen in Waldkirch to extend his family's influence into the Rhineland. On his father's arrest and execution for high treason in 911, he and his wife, Regelinda, daughter of Count Eberhard I of Zürich, went to Italy: either banished by Count Erchanger or voluntarily exiling themselves to their relatives over the Alps. Around 913, Burchard returned from exile and took control over his father's property. In 915, he joined Erchanger and Arnulf, Duke of Bavaria, in battle at Wahlwies. Following the battle, Erchanger was proclaimed duke.

After Erchanger was executed on 21 January 917, Burchard seized all his lands and was recognised universally as duke. In 919, King Rudolph II of Upper Burgundy seized the county of Zürich and invaded the region of Konstanz, then the centre and practical capital of the Swabian duchy. At Winterthur, however, Rudolph was defeated by Burchard, who thus consolidated the duchy and forced on the king his own territorial claims. In that same year, he recognised the newly elected king of Germany, Henry the Fowler, duke of Saxony. Henry in turn gave Burchard rights of taxation and investiture of bishops and abbots in his duchy.

In 922, Burchard married his daughter Bertha to Rudolph and affirmed the peace of three years prior. Burchard then accompanied Rudolph into Italy when he was elected king by opponents of the Emperor Berengar. In 924, the emperor died and Hugh of Arles was elected by his partisans to oppose Rudolph. Burchard attacked Novara, defended by the troops of Lambert, Archbishop of Milan. There he was killed, probably on 29 April. His widow, Regelinda (d. 958), remarried to Burchard's successor, Herman I. She had given him five children:

- Gisela (c. 905 – 26 October 923 or 925), abbess of Waldkirch
- Hicha (c. 905 – 950), married Werner V whose son was Conrad, Duke of Lorraine
- Burchard III (c. 915 – 11 November 973), later duke of Swabia
- Bertha (c. 907 – 2 January 966), married Rudolph II, King of Burgundy
- Adalric (d. 973), monk in Einsiedeln Abbey.

It has also been posited that Burchard was the father of Theodoric of Wettin, thus siring the line of Wettin.

== Sources ==
- Duckett, Eleanor Shipley (1988). Death and Life in the Tenth Century. The University of Michigan Press.
- Jackman, Donald C. (2009). Ius hereditarium Encountered II: Approaches to Reginlint. Editions Enlaplage. ISBN 978-1-936466-53-5.
- Köbler, Gerhard, ed. (2007). Historisches Lexikon der Deutschen Länder: Die Deutschen Territorien vom Mittelalter bis zur Gegenwart (in German). C.H. Beck.
- Reuter, Timothy; McKitterick, Rosamond, eds. (1999). "Appendix". The New Cambridge Medieval History: Volume 3, c.900-c.1024. Cambridge University Press.

Burchard II of Swabia Hunfridings Born: 883 or 884 Died: 29 April 926
Regnal titles
Preceded by Erchanger	Duke of Swabia; 917–926	Succeeded by Herman I
