= Conrad I of Swabia =

Duke of Swabia

Conrad or Konrad I (915/920 - 20 August 997) was Duke of Swabia from 983 until 997. His appointment as duke marked the return of Conradine rule over Swabia for the first time since 948.

== Life ==
There is considerable confusion about Conrad and his family. He is often identified with Cuno or Kuno of Öhningen, both 'names' being diminutive medieval forms of Conrad. The identities of his parents are not known for certain. There is no documented reason to establish that he is the son of Count Udo from the Wetterau, and his mother an unknown daughter of Herbert I, Count of Vermandois. There is also some debate about the identity of Conrad's wife. She is often said to be Reglint (or Richlind), daughter of Liudolf, Duke of Swabia, and thus a granddaughter of Emperor Otto I. Others argue that his wife was Judith, daughter of Adalbert of Marchtal.

When Duke Otto I unexpectedly died during the Imperial campaign in Italy of 981-982, he left no heirs. To fill the vacancy, Emperor Otto II (who may have been Conrad's brother-in-law) appointed Conrad as Duke of Swabia. Conrad is notable for being the first Swabian duke to keep the title in the family; after his death in 997 he was succeeded by his son Hermann II.

== Children ==
With his wife, Conrad had at least six children, including:

- Liutold
- Conrad
- Hermann II
- Ita, who married Rudolf II, Count of Altdorf
- Judith, who married firstly an unnamed husband from Rheinfelden, and secondly, Adalbert II, Count of Metz (died 1033)
- Kunizza "Hemma" (died 1020), who married Friedrich I., probably count of Dießen
- A possible unnamed daughter who was among the last wives of Vladimir the Great, mother of Maria Dobroniega of Kiev

Adelheid von Rheinfelden, wife of Lothar Udo of the Northern Marches, was also said to have been a daughter of Kuno of Öhningen.

== Sources ==
- E. Hlawitschka, Konradiner-Genealogie, unstatthafte Verwandtenehen und spätottonisch-frühsalische Thronbesetzungspraxis. Ein Rückblick auf 25 Jahre Forschungsdisput. (Monumenta Germaniae Historica, Studien und Texte 32) (Hannover, 2003).
- A. Wolf, 'Wer war Kuno von Öhningen? Überlegungen zum Herzogtum Konrads von Schwaben († 997) und zur Königswahl vom Jahre 1002,' in Deutsches Archiv 36 (1980), 25-85.
- E. Brandenburg, Die Nachkommen Karls des Großen (1935)
- D. Schwennicke, Europäische Stammtafeln: Stammtafeln zur Geschichte der Europäischen Staaten, Neue Folge, Band III, Teilband 1 (Marburg, Germany: J. A. Stargardt, 1984), Tafel 49
- D. C. Jackman: The Konradiner. A Study in Genealogical Methodology (Frankfurt am Main, 1990).
- J. Fried, 'Prolepsis oder Tod. Methodische und andere Bemerkungen zur Konradiner-Genealogie im 10. und frühen 11. Jahrhundert', in J. Dahlbauer et al., ed., Papstgeschichte und Landesgeschichte. Festschrift für Hermann Jakobs zum 65. Geburtstag (Cologne, 1995).
- Warner, David, ed. (2001). Ottonian Germany: The Chronicon of Thietmar of Merseburg. Manchester University Press.

Preceded by Otto I	Duke of Swabia; 983–997	Succeeded by Hermann II
