= Burchard III of Swabia =

Duke of Swabia from 954 to 973

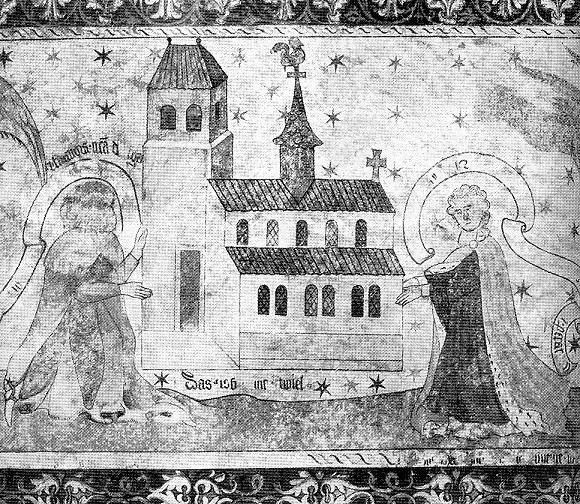
Burchard and his second wife Hedwig

Burchard III (c. 915 – 12 November 973), a member of the Hunfriding dynasty, was the count of Thurgau and Zürichgau, perhaps of Rhaetia, and then Duke of Swabia from 954 to his death.

== Life ==
Burchard was the son of Burchard II, Duke of Swabia and Regilinda. (Note: "Likely a son, but certainly a close relative of the Burchard II killed in 926.") At a young age on the murder of his father in 926, he was sent to Saxony for his safety after the accession of the duke Herman I.

After the rebellion of Duke Liudolf, son of King Otto I, in 954, the king bestowed the ducal title on his nephew-in-law Burchard at a general council at Arnstadt. Burchard was an intimate of Otto and his queen, Adelaide of Italy. He was often at the royal court and he accompanied Otto on his campaign against the Magyars and was present at the great Battle of the Lechfeld on 10 August 955.

In 965, Burchard led a third campaign against Berengar II in Italy. At the Battle of the Po on 25 June, he defeated Berengar's son, Adalbert, and restored Italy to Ottonian control, even the south Italian principalities were brought to heel by 972. In 973, he died and was buried in the chapel of Saint Erasmus in the monastery on Reichenau Island in Lake Constance. He was succeeded by Otto, son of Liudolf.

== Marriage & issue ==
In Saxony, he married a member of the Immedinger family. They had one or two sons:

- possibly Theodoric, count of Wettin; alternatively presented as his brother or completely unrelated (see his own article)
- Burchard, count of Liesgau.

His second marriage was to Hedwig, daughter of Henry I, Duke of Bavaria. Burchard built the great fortress atop the Hohentwiel, and Hedwig was the foundress of the monastery of St. George there, but their marriage remained childless.

== Sources ==
- Bachrach, David S. (2012). Warfare in Tenth-Century Germany. The Boydell Press.
- Bowlus, Charles R. (2006). The Battle of Lechfeld and its Aftermath, August 955: The End of the Age of. Routledge.
- Greer, Sarah (2021). Commemorating Power in Early Medieval Saxony: Writing and Rewriting the Past at Gandersheim and Quedlinburg. Oxford University Press.
- Leyser, Karl (1979). Rule and Conflict in an Early Medieval Society:Ottonian Saxony. Edward Arnold.
- Reuter, Timothy (1991). Germany in the Early Middle Ages C. 800-1056. Routledge.

Preceded by Liudolf	Duke of Swabia; 954–973	Succeeded by Otto I
