= Unruochings =

Frankish noble family

Unruoching dynasty Unrochides Unruochings
- Noble family
- Country: Holy Roman Empire; Kingdom of Italy; Francia
- Founded: 9th century
- Founder: Unroch I of Friuli
- Final ruler: Berengar I
- Titles: Emperor of the Romans; King of Italy; Margrave of Friuli; Count of Barcelona
- Estate: Cysoing monastery
- Dissolution: 0924; 1102 years ago

The Unruochings (Italian: Unrochingi ; French: Unrochides; German: Unruochinger) were a Frankish noble family who established themselves in Italy. The family is named for the first member to come to prominence, Unruoch II of Friuli (floruit early 9th century).

== Titles in Northern Italy ==
The family members held various titles in Northern Italy, including Margrave and Duke of Friuli, one of the lordships established on the eastern Marches of the Frankish Empire. The March of Friuli was considerably larger than modern Friuli, covering much of the modern Veneto and as far west as the Province of Brescia in Lombardy.

== Landholdings in France and Belgium ==
The family's main landholdings, however, were in modern France, north of the River Seine, and southern Belgium. The family monastery, the centre of their power, was at Cysoing, near Tournai.

== Female-line descendants in the throne of Italy ==
King Berengar I of Italy belonged to this family. Berengar left no male heirs, but the descendants of his daughter Gisela of Friuli and Adalbert I of Ivrea including their son Berengar II of Italy, Berengar II's son Adalbert, and Adalbert's son Otto-William, Duke of Burgundy, are counted among the Unruochings.

== Noted members ==
Noted members of the family in the direct line included:

- Unruoch II of Friuli (floruit early 9th century)
- Berengar the Wise (died 835)
- Eberhard of Friuli (died 866)
- Unruoch III of Friuli (died c. 874)
- Berengar I of Italy (died 924)
