= Gisela, daughter of Louis the Pious =

Frankish noble, daughter of Louis the Pious

Gisela
- Duchess of Friuli
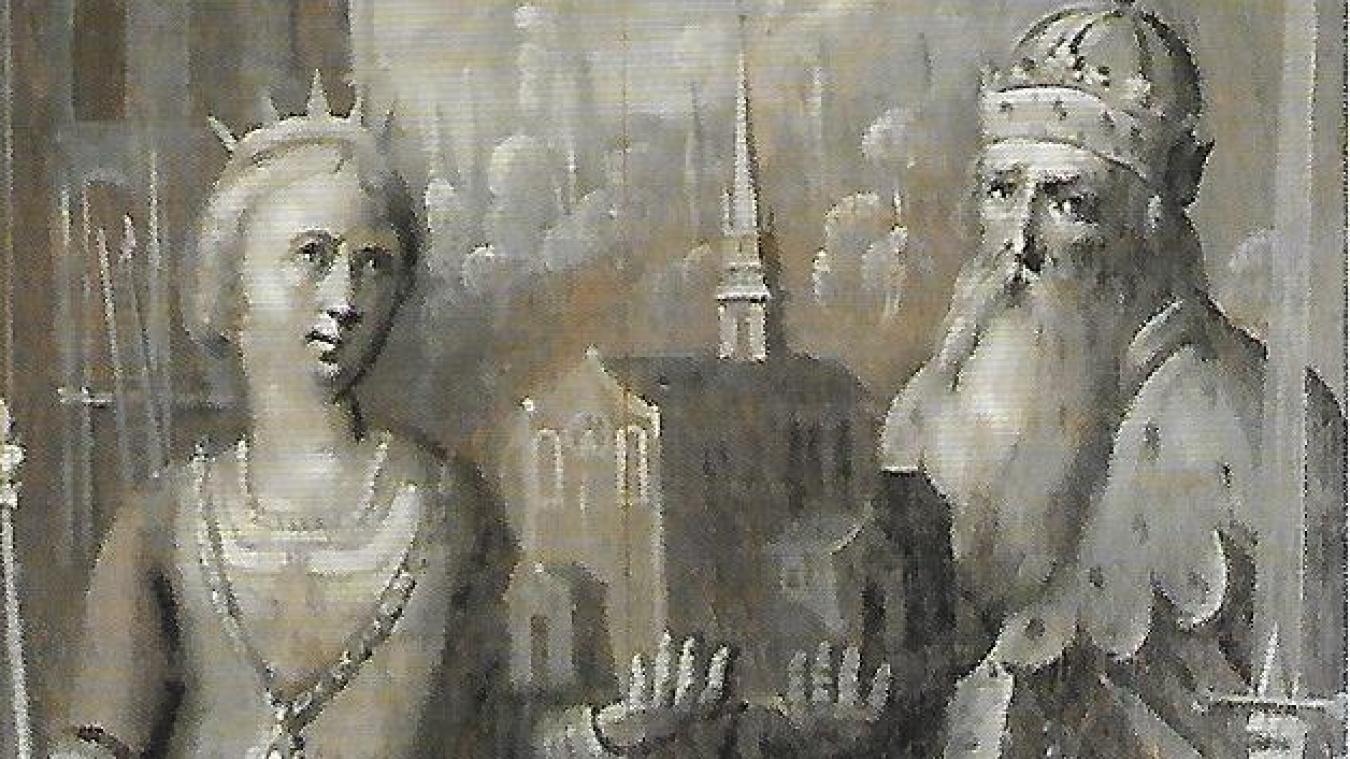
- Gisela and her husband.
- Born: 820
- Spouse: Eberhard of Friuli
- Issue: Unruoch III of Friuli; Berengar I of Italy; Ingeltrude; Hatwige; Judith
- House: Carolingian dynasty
- Father: Louis the Pious
- Mother: Judith of Bavaria

Gisela (born 820) was the only daughter of Louis the Pious and his second wife, Judith of Bavaria. She married the powerful and influential Eberhard, Duke of Friuli, later canonized as Saint Eberhard, with whom she had several children including King Berengar I of Italy, Margrave of Friuli. Gisela was renowned for her piety and virtue, much like her namesake, Gisela (the sister of Charlemagne), who had chosen the religious life from girlhood.

Her dowry consisted of many rich domains including the fisc of Cysoing; located at the center of the country of Pèvele, Cysoing was one of the most beautiful fiscs in the region and became one of her and Eberhard's regular residences. They founded a monastery there, in the 850s, which was not completed until after their deaths.

The nunnery San Salvatore was given to her after Ermengarde, wife of Lothair I. For a time, she served as both abbess and rectrix.

She dedicated herself to the education of her and Eberhard's many children.

Her and her husband’s will is one of the most famous wills of the ninth century and is dated between 863 and 864.

== Issue ==
- Unruoch III of Friuli, born about c. 840
- Berengar I, King of Italy, born c. 845
- Ingeltrude
- Hatwige of Friuli
- Waldrada Judith d' Auxerre Friuli
- Judith of Friuli born c. 838

== Bibliography ==
Scholar references for: Waldrada Judith d'Auxerre scholarworks
