= Liudolf, Duke of Swabia =

Duke of Swabia from 950 to 957

Liudolf

Duke of Swabia
- Reign: 950 – 957
- Predecessor: Herman I
- Successor: Burchard III
- Born: c. 930; Magdeburg
- Died: 6 September 957 (aged c. 27); Pombia, Lake Maggiore
- Burial: Saint Alban's Abbey, Mainz
- Ida of Swabia
- Issue: Otto I, Duke of Swabia and Bavaria; Mathilde, Abbess of Essen
- House: Ottonian
- Father: Otto the Great
- Mother: Eadgyth

Liudolf (c. 930 – 6 September 957), a member of the Ottonian dynasty, was duke of Swabia from 950 until 954. His rebellion in 953/54 led to a major crisis in East Francia.

== Rise ==
Liudolf was the only son of the Saxon duke Otto the Great, son and heir of the German king Henry the Fowler, by his first wife Eadgyth, daughter of the English king Edward the Elder. Otto ascended the German throne in 936 and Liudolf, as his designated heir and successor, received a broad education.

In 939 his father betrothed him to Ida, daughter and heiress of the Conradine duke Herman I of Swabia. The marriage was concluded about 947/948; when Duke Herman died shortly afterwards, King Otto appointed his eldest son and heir apparent duke. Liudolf was a popular ruler with the tribe and was able to consolidate Ottonian dominance in Swabia.

When in November 950 King Lothair II of Italy died, Berengar II usurped the throne and had Lothair's widow Adelaide, a relative of Liudolf's wife Ida, imprisoned. Moreover, as Adelaide was the sister of Otto's ally King Conrad I of Burgundy, the German king prepared for a campaign to Italy. Nevertheless, Liudolf forestalled his father's plans and in early 951 led a Swabian army across the Alps and invaded Lombardy. His father was displeased and foiled his plans, supported by his brother Duke Henry I of Bavaria, who considered Liudolf's campaign a violation of his interests in Northern Italy. The Swabian duke received little support by the Italian nobility and finally had to follow the approaching forces of his father, leaving him without much gain.

== Rebellion ==
When King Otto married Adelaide, the heiress to Italy, Liudolf felt his position threatened. He underlined his right of succession by lavishly celebrating Christmas 951 like a king at the Kaiserpfalz in Saalfeld and forged an alliance with his brother-in-law Duke Conrad of Lorraine.

Adelaide gave birth to a son, and Liudolf raised the flag of revolt in 953. Though he had the support of his Swabians, his ally Duke Conrad the Red was opposed by his own subjects in Lorraine. The Bavarians of Duke Henry I, Liudolf's uncle, supported Liudolf, but Henry and Otto together put down the rebellion. In 954, he was deprived of his duchy and, though reconciled with his father, he did not regain it. He invaded Italy for a second time in 957 and many cities capitulated before him and Berengar fled. He died unexpectedly of fever amidst his victorious campaign at Pombia, near Novara, on September 6 and was buried in St. Alban's Abbey, Mainz.

== Legacy ==
Liudolf's son by Ida, Otto, was later duke of Bavaria and Swabia. Liudolf's daughter, Matilda, was abbess of the Essen Abbey. He also founded the city of Stuttgart in southern Germany. Historians still debate the existence of another daughter, named Richlinde (according to historian Armin Wolf) who married Cuno of Öhningen, whose son, Conrad I, became Otto I's successor in Swabia in 982; this union would represent the genealogical connection between the Liudolfings and the Conradines.

== Sources ==
- Barraclough, Geoffrey, ed. (1961). Studies in Mediaeval History:Mediaeval Germany. Vol. II. Essays. Basil Blackwell.
- Garrison, Eliza (2012). Ottonian Imperial Art and Portraiture: The Artistic Patronage of Otto III and Henry II. Routledge.
- Schutz, Herbert (2010). The Medieval Empire in Central Europe: Dynastic Continuity in the Post-Carolingian Frankish Realm, 900-1300. Cambridge University Scholars.

Liudolf, Duke of Swabia House of Otto Born: c. 930 Died: 6 September 957
German nobility
Preceded by Herman I	Duke of Swabia; 950–954	Succeeded by Burchard III
