= Hunfridings =

Hunfridings Burchardings
- Noble family
- Country: Friuli, Istria, and Swabia
- Founded: c. 799
- Founder: Hunfrid of Istria
- Current head: Michael Prinz von Sachsen-Weimar-Eisenach (through the House of Wettin, theorized)
- Final ruler: Burchard III of Swabia
- Dissolution: 973

The Hunfridings or Burchardings (Bouchardids) were a family of most likely Alemannic origin who rose to prominence in their homeland, eventually becoming the first ducal dynasty of Swabia. The first known member of the family was Hunfrid, Margrave of Istria and, according to some sources, last Duke of Friuli under Charlemagne from 799. The last member of the clan was Burchard III, Duke of Swabia, who died in 973. Descendants of the dynasty may have lived on in through a second son of Burchard II of Swabia, and thus the House of Wettin.

The most common names in the family were Hunfrid, Adalbert, Odalric/Ulric, and Burchard. During the rise of the jüngeres Stammesherzogtum, or the "younger" stem duchies, the Hunfridings, like the Conradines in Franconia, were merely the most powerful among many well-entrenched ancient families vying for supremacy in Swabia.

When certain Hunfridings, Odalric and Hunfrid III, rebelled against Louis the German in the 850s and fled to the court of Charles the Bald in West Francia, they were enfeoffed in Gothia and even given the title marchio, but though they successfully dealt with the Moorish threat from Iberia, they failed to establish a dynasty there.

The Hunfriding genealogy is difficult to trace with certainty. That the later Swabian dukes were descendants of the margrave of Istria and relatives to the host of other counts whose names were common in the family is difficult to prove with certainty, but is nonetheless very likely.
