= Family tree of German monarchs =

This is a family tree of the kings and emperors of Germany. It covers the rulers of East Francia, the medieval German kingdom and the Holy Roman Empire, together with the German Confederation and the German Empire. The chart runs from Charlemagne, crowned emperor in 800, and Louis the German, who took the eastern Frankish kingdom at the partition of Verdun in 843, to Wilhelm II, who abdicated in 1918, and traces the marriages and lines of descent that connected the successive ruling houses.

The royal house names and dates are given at the appropriate places. The dynasties covered are the Carolingians, Widonids, Conradines, Ottonians, Salians, Supplinburger, Hohenstaufen, Welf, Habsburg, Nassau, Luxembourg, Wittelsbach, Lorraine, Habsburg-Lorraine, Bonaparte and Hohenzollern.

Only undisputed kings are included; this excludes rulers whose elections were contested, such as Richard of Cornwall and Alfonso X of Castile, both elected German king in the double election of 1257.

The title of these rulers changed over time. The earliest were kings of East Francia. The description of the kingdom as German (regnum Teutonicorum) emerged only in the eleventh century, and gained force when Gregory VII used it to reduce Henry IV to "merely a German king" during the Investiture Controversy. A king elected but not yet crowned emperor was styled King of the Romans.

== Chart ==
Except where a specific citation is given, the genealogical relationships below follow the standard tables in Schwennicke 1998 and the biographies in Schneidmüller & Weinfurter 2003.

Carolingian
Charlemagne; 742/748–814; King of the Franks r. 800–814
Pepin of Italy; 777–810; King of Italy | Ermengarde of Hesbaye c. 778 – 818 | Louis I the Pious; 778–840; King of the Franks r. 813–840 | Judith of Bavaria; 797/805–843
Widonid
Lambert I of Nantes d. 836 | Adalhaid/Adelaide of Lombardy | Gebhard d. 879; Count of the Lahngau | Louis II the German c. 810 – 876; King of East Francia r. 843–876 | Hemma; 803/808–876 | Gisela b. 821 | Eberhard c. 815 – 866; Duke of Friuli
Guy I of Spoleto d. 860 | Udo of Neustria; 860–879 | Berengar I of Neustria c. 836 – aft. 879; Count of Hesse | Liutswind | Carloman; 830–880; King of Bavaria r. 876–880 | Irmgard of Chiemsee c. 830/833 – 866 | Louis the Younger; 830/835–882; King of Saxony r. 876–882 | Liutgard of Saxony c. 845 – 885 | Gisela of Alsace c. 840 – 895 | Berthold I c. 838 – 896; Count Palatine of Swabia | Charles III the Fat; 839–888; King of East Francia | Richardis c. 840 – c. 895
Guy III of Spoleto d. 894; Emperor of the Romans r. 891–894 | Conrad d. 906; Duke of Thuringia | Ota c. 874 – 899/903 | Arnulf of Carinthia; 850–899; King of East Francia r. 887–899 | Hugh of Saxony c. 850 – 880 | Louis; 876–879 | Hildegard | Bernhart | Henry of Franconia ?–886 | ? Ingeltrude; 837/840–870
Conradines
Lambert of Italy c. 880 – 898; Emperor of the Romans r. 892–898 | Conrad I the Younger c. 890 – 918; King of Germany r. 911–918 | Cunigunde of Swabia b. c. 880 | Louis III the Child; 893–911; King of East Francia r. 900–911 | Ratold; King of Italy | Zwentibold; 870–900; King of Lotharingia | Oda of Saxony; 875/880 – aft. 952 | Otto I the Illustrious c. 851 – 912; Duke of Saxony | Hedwiga of Babenberg c. 856 – 903
Ottonian
Matilda of Ringelheim c. 895 – 968 | Henry I the Fowler; 876–936; King of Germany r. 919–936 | Hatheburg
Gilbert c. 890 – 939; Duke of Lorraine | Gerberga of Saxony c. 913 – 984? | Louis IV; 920–954; King of the Franks | Bruno the Great; 925–965; Archbishop of Cologne | Thankmar c. 908 – 938
Hugh the Great; 898–956; Duke of the Franks | Hedwig of Saxony c. 910 – 965 | Eadgyth of England; 910–946 | Otto I the Great; 912–973; King of Germany r. 936–973; Holy Roman Emperor r. 962–973 | Adelaide of Italy; 931–999 | Henry I 919/921–955; Duke of Bavaria | Judith of Bavaria; 925 – c. 985
Hugh Capet c. 941 – 996; King of the Franks | Liudolf c. 930 – 957; Duke of Swabia | Liutgarde; 931–953 | Conrad c. 922 – 955; Duke of Lorraine | William; 929–968; Archbishop of Mainz | Otto II the Red; 955–983; King of Germany r. 961–983; Holy Roman Emperor r. 967–983 | Theophanu c. 955 – 991 | Bruno; 954–957? | Matilda; 954–999; Abbess of Quedlinburg | Henry II the Wrangler; 951–995; Duke of Bavaria | Gisela of Burgundy d. 1006
Otto I c. 948 – 1004; Duke of Carinthia | Judith of Carinthia d. 991 | Sophia I 975–1039; Abbess of Gandersheim | Adelaide I 977–1044; Abbess of Quedlinburg | Matilda of Germany; 979–1025 | Ezzo c. 955 – 1034; Count Palatine of Lotharingia | Otto III; 980–1002; King of Germany r. 983–1002; Holy Roman Emperor r. 996–1002 | Cunigunde of Luxembourg c. 975 – 1040 | Henry II; 973–1024; King of Germany r. 1002–1024; Holy Roman Emperor r. 1014–1024
Henry of Speyer; 965/970– 989/992 | Adelaide of Alsace d. 1039/1046? | Liudolf of Lotharingia c. 1000 – 1031 | Otto II d. 1047; Duke of Swabia | Herman II; 995–1056; Archbishop of Cologne | Theophanu d. 1058; Abbess of Essen | Richeza d. 1063; Queen of Poland | Mieszko II Lambert c. 990 – 1034; King of Poland
Salian
Conrad II; 990–1039; King of Germany r. 1024–1039; Holy Roman Emperor r. 1027–1039 | Gisela of Swabia; 989/990 –1043 | Ernest I ?–1012–1015; Duke of Swabia | Brun I of Brunswick c. 975 – c. 1010 | Casimir I the Restorer; 1016–1058; Duke of Poland | Maria Dobroniega of Kiev c. 1012 – 1087
Gunhilda of Denmark c. 1020 – 1038 | Henry III the Black; 1017–1056; King of Germany r. 1028–1056; Holy Roman Emperor r. 1046–1056 | Agnes of Poitou c. 1025 – 1077 | Beatrix; 1020 – c. 1036 | Mathilde b. 1027
Beatrice I of Quedlinburg; 1037–1061 | Rudolf of Rheinfelden c. 1025 – 1080 | Matilda; 1048–1060 | Adelaide II of Quedlinburg; 1045–1096 | Bertha of Savoy; 1051–1087 | Henry IV; 1050–1106; King of Germany r. 1053–1105; Holy Roman Emperor r. 1084–1105 | Eupraxia of Kiev; 1067/1070–1109 | Conrad II; 1052–1055; Duke of Bavaria | Solomon; 1053–1087; King of Hungary | Judith of Swabia; 1054 – c. 1105 | Władysław I 1044–1102; Duke of Poland
Supplinburger
Lothair III; 1075–1137; King of Germany r. 1125–1137; Holy Roman Emperor r. 1133–1137 | Richenza of Northeim c. 1087/1089 – 1141 | Henry IX; 1075–1126; Duke of Bavaria | Adelheid; 1070–1079 | Henry; 1071–1071 | Frederick I 1050–1105; Duke of Swabia | Agnes of Germany; 1072–1143 | Leopold III; 1073–1136; Mgve of Austria | Conrad II; 1074–1101; King of Germany r. 1087–1098 | Henry V 1086–1125; King of Germany r. 1099–1125; Holy Roman Emperor r. 1111–1125 | Matilda of England; 1102–1167
Hohenstaufen
Gertrude; 1115–1143 | Henry X the Proud c. 1108 – 1139; Duke of Bavaria | Judith of Bavaria; 1103–1131 | Frederick II; 1090–1147; Duke of Swabia | Agnes of Saarbrücken d. c. 1147 | Gertrude of Comburg d. 1130/1131 | Conrad III; 1093–1152; King of Germany r. 1138–1152 | Gertrude of Sulzbach c. 1110 – 1146
Henry the Lion; 1129–1195; Duke of Bavaria | Matilda of England; 1156–1189 | Matthias I 1119–1176; Duke of Lorraine | Bertha; 1123–1195 | Adelaide of Vohburg; 1135–1190 | Frederick I Barbarossa; 1122–1190; King of Germany r. 1152–1190; Holy Roman Emperor r. 1155–1190 | Beatrice I 1143–1184; Countess of Burgundy | Conrad; 1135–1195; Count Palatine of the Rhine | Judith of Hohenstaufen c. 1133 – 1191 | Henry; Berengar; 1136–1150; King of Germany r. 1147–1150 | Frederick IV; 1145–1167; Duke of Swabia
Irene Angelina c. 1181 – 1208 | Philip of Swabia; 1177–1208; King of Germany r. 1198–1208 | Beatrice; 1162–1174 | William II the Good; 1155–1189; King of Sicily | Frederick V 1164–1170; Duke of Swabia | Frederick VI; 1167–1191; Duke of Swabia | Joan I 1191–1205; Countess of Burgundy | Otto I btw. 1167/1171 – 1200; Count of Burgundy | Beatrice II; 1193–1231; Countess of Burgundy | Conrad II; 1173–1196; Duke of Swabia
Welf
Otto IV; 1175–1218; King of Germany r. 1198–1209; Holy Roman Emperor r. 1209–1215 | Beatrice of Swabia; 1198–1212 | Kunigunde of Swabia; 1202–1248 | Wenceslaus I c. 1205 – 1253; King of Bohemia | Renaud; 1173 | Henry VI; 1165–1197; King of Germany r. 1169–1197; Holy Roman Emperor r. 1191–1197 | Constance; 1154–1198; Queen of Sicily | William; 1176 | Agnes; 1181–1184 | Gisela; 1168–1184
Henry II; 1207–1248; Duke of Brabant | Maria of Swabia; 1201–1235 | Elisabeth of Swabia; 1205–1235 | Ferdinand III; 1199/1201–1252; King of Castile | Constance of Aragon; 1179–1222 | Frederick II; 1194–1250; King of Germany r. 1212–1250; Holy Roman Emperor r. 1220–1250 | Isabella II; Queen of Jerusalem | Isabella of England; 1214–1241
Adelaide of Burgundy c. 1223 – 1273 | Henry III c. 1230 – 1261; Duke of Brabant | Margaret of Austria c. 1204 – 1266 | Henry (VII); 1211–1242; King of Germany r. 1220–1235 | Elisabeth of Bavaria c. 1227 – 1273 | Conrad IV (of Sicily); 1228–1254; King of Germany r. 1237–1254 | Margareta; 1226–1227 | Henry; Otto; 1238–1253 | Margaret of Sicily; 1241–1270 | Albert II; 1240–1314; Mgve of Meissen
Margaret of Flanders d. 1285 | John I 1252–1294; Duke of Brabant | Albert IV c. 1188 – 1239; Count of Habsburg | Hedwig of Kyburg | Conradin; 1252–1268; King of Jerusalem | Frederick I 1257–1323; Mgve of Meissen
Habsburg
Isabella of Burgundy; 1270–1323 | Rudolf I 1218–1291; King of Germany r. 1273–1291; Duke of Austria | Gertrude of Hohenberg c. 1225 – 1281
Hartmann; 1263–1281 | Elizabeth of Carinthia c. 1262 – 1312 | Albert I 1255–1308; Duke of Austria; King of Germany r. 1298–1308 | Catherine; 1256–1282 | Otto III; 1261–1312; Duke of Bavaria | Agnes c. 1257 – 1322 | Albert II c. 1250 – 1298; Duke of Saxony | Hedwig of Habsburg d. 1285/1286 | Otto VI c. 1255 – 1303; Mgve of Brandenburg | Clemence of Austria; 1262–1293/1295 | Charles; Martel of Anjou; 1271–1295
Blanche of France c. 1278 – 1305 | Rudolf I 1281–1307; King of Bohemia | Frederick III the Fair; 1289–1330; King of Germany r. 1314–1330 | Isabella of Aragon; 1305–1330 | Agnes of Bohemia | Rudolf II; 1270–1290; Duke of Austria r. 1282–1283 | Wenceslaus II; 1271–1305; King of Bohemia | Judith of Habsburg; 1271–1297 | Matilda of Habsburg; 1253–1304 | Louis II; 1229–1294; Duke of Bavaria
Luxembourg | Nassau | Wittelsbach
Elizabeth of Virneburg c. 1303 – 1343 | Henry the Friendly of Austria; 1299–1327 | Leopold I 1290–1326; Duke of Austria | Catherine of Savoy; 1284–1336 | Margaret of Brabant; 1276–1311 | Henry VII; 1275–1313; King of Germany r. 1308–1313; Holy Roman Emperor r. 1312–1313 | Adolf; 1255–1298; King of Germany r. 1292–1298
Anne of Austria; 1275–1327 | Agnes of Austria; 1281–1364 | Catherine of Austria; 1295–1323 | Elisabeth of Austria c. 1285 – 1353 | John; 1296–1346; King of Bohemia | Elizabeth of Bohemia; 1292–1330 | Mechtild of Nassau bef. 1280 – 1323 | Rudolf I 1274–1319; Duke of Bavaria | Louis IV; 1282–1347; King of Germany r. 1314–1347; Holy Roman Emperor r. 1328–1347 | Beatrice of Silesia; 1290–1322
Joanna of Pfirt; 1300–1351 | Albert II; 1298–1358; Duke of Austria | Otto IV; 1301–1339; Duke of Austria | Anne of Bohemia; 1323–1338 | Anna of Świdnica; 1339–1362 | Charles IV; 1316–1378; King of Germany r. 1346–1378; Holy Roman Emperor r. 1355–1378 | Elizabeth of Pomerania c. 1347 – 1393 | Adolf; 1300–1327; Count Palatine of the Rhine | Irmengard of Öttingen d. 1399 | Matilda of Bavaria aft. 1313 – 1346 | Frederick II; 1310–1349; Margrave of Meissen
Leopold III; 1351–1386; Duke of Austria | Viridis Visconti; 1352–1414 | Beatrice of Nuremberg c. 1362 – 1414 | Albert III; 1349–1395; Duke of Austria | Elisabeth of Bohemia; 1358–1373 | Joanna of Bavaria c. 1362 – 1386 | Wenceslaus IV; 1361–1419; King of Germany r. 1376–1400 | Sophia of Bavaria; 1376–1428 | Sigismund; 1368–1437; King of Germany r. 1410–1437; Holy Roman Emperor r. 1433–1437 | Barbara of Cilli; 1392–1451 | Beatrice of Sicily; 1326–1365 | Rupert II; 1325–1398; Elector Palatine
Frederick IV; 1382–1439; Duke of Austria | Ernest the Iron; 1377–1424; Duke of Austria | Cymburgis of Masovia; 1394/1397 –1429 | Albert IV; 1377–1404; Duke of Austria | Joanna Sophia of Bavaria c. 1373 – 1410 | Rupert; 1352–1410; King of Germany r. 1400–1410
Habsburg
Sigismund; 1427–1496; Archduke of Austria | Albert VI; 1418–1463; Archduke of Austria | Frederick III/V the Peaceful; 1415–1493; Archduke of Austria; King of Germany r. 1440–1493; Holy Roman Emperor r. 1452–1493 | Eleanor of Portugal; 1434–1467 | Margarete; 1395–1447 | Henry XVI; 1386–1450; Duke of Bavaria | Albert II; 1397–1439; King of Germany r. 1438–1439 | Elizabeth of Luxembourg; 1409–1442
Isabella I 1451–1504; Queen of Castile | Ferdinand II; 1452–1516; King of Aragon and Castile | Albert IV; 1447–1508; Duke of Bavaria | Kunigunde of Austria; 1465–1520 | Maximilian I 1459–1519; German King r. 1486–1519; Holy Roman Emperor r. 1508–1519 | Mary of Burgundy; 1457–1482 | William III the Brave; 1425–1482; Landgrave of Thuringia | Anne of Austria; 1432–1462 | Ladislaus the Posthumous; 1440–1457; King of Hungary | Elizabeth of Austria; 1436–1505 | Casimir IV; Jagiellon; 1427–1492; King of Poland
Joanna; 1479–1555; Queen of Castile and Aragon | Philip I the Handsome; 1478–1506; King of Castile | John; 1478–1497; Prince of Asturias | Margaret; 1480–1530; Duchess of Savoy | Philibert II; 1480–1504; Duke of Savoy | Vladislaus II; 1456–1516; King of Hungary
Maria of Aragon; 1482–1517 | Manuel I 1469–1521; King of Portugal | Eleanor of Austria; 1498–1558 | Isabella of Austria; 1501–1526 | Christian II; 1481–1559; King of Denmark, Norway, and Sweden | Ferdinand I 1503–1564; King in Germany r. 1531–1564; Holy Roman Emperor r. 1558–1564 | Anne of Bohemia; 1503–1547 | Mary of Hungary; 1505–1558 | Louis II; 1506–1526; King of Hungary
Isabella of Portugal; 1503–1539 | Charles V 1500–1558; King of Germany and Spain r. 1519–1556; Holy Roman Emperor r. 1519–1558 | John III; 1502–1557; King of Portugal | Catherine of Austria; 1507–1578 | Philippine Welser; 1527–1580 | Ferdinand II; 1529–1595; Archduke of Austria | Anna Gonzaga; 1566–1621 | Anna of Austria; 1528–1590 | Albert V 1528–1579; Duke of Bavaria
Maria Manuela of Portugal; 1527–1545 | Joanna of Austria; 1535–1573 | João Manuel; 1537–1554; Prince of Portugal | Maria of Austria; 1528–1603 | Maximilian II; 1527–1576; King in Germany r. 1562–1576; Holy Roman Emperor r. 1564–1576 | Charles II; 1540–1590; Archduke of Austria | Maria Anna of Bavaria; 1551–1608 | William V 1548–1626; Duke of Bavaria
Mary I 1516–1558; Queen of England | Philip II(I); 1527–1598; King of England, Naples, Sicily, Sardinia, Spain, and Portugal | Anna of Austria; 1549–1580 | Rudolf II; 1552–1612; King in Germany r. 1575–1612; Holy Roman Emperor r. 1576–1612 | Ernest of Austria; 1553–1595 | Elisabeth of Austria; 1554–1592 | Charles IX; 1550–1574; King of France | Anna of Tyrol; 1585–1618 | Matthias; 1557–1619; King in Germany; Holy Roman Emperor r. 1612–1619 | Maximilian III; 1558–1618; Archduke of Austria
Elisabeth of Valois; 1545–1568 | Isabella Clara; 1566–1633 | Albert VII; 1559–1621; Archduke of Austria | Wenceslaus of Austria; 1561–1578 | Margaret of Austria; 1567–1633
Philip III; 1578–1621; King of Spain | Margaret of Austria; 1584–1611 | Claudia de' Medici; 1604–1648 | Leopold V 1586–1632; Archduke of Austria | Eleonora Gonzaga; 1598–1655 | Ferdinand II; 1578–1637; King in Germany; Holy Roman Emperor r. 1619–1637 | Maria Anna of Bavaria; 1574–1616
Maria Anna of Spain; 1606–1646 | Ferdinand III; 1608–1657; King of Germany; Holy Roman Emperor r. 1637–1657 | Eleonora Gonzaga; 1630–1686 | Maria Leopoldine of Austria; 1632–1649 | Maria Anna of Austria; 1610–1665 | Maximilian I 1573–1651; Elector of Bavaria | Cecilia Renata of Austria; 1611–1644 | Władysław IV; 1595–1648; King of Poland; Grand Duke of Lithuania | Leopold of Austria; 1614–1662
Philip IV; 1605–1665; King of Spain | Mariana of Austria; 1634–1696 | Ferdinand IV; 1633–1654; King of Germany r. 1653–1654 | Maria Anna of Austria; 1654–1689 | Johann Wilhelm; 1658–1716; Elector Palatine | Michał I 1640–1673; King of Poland; Grand Duke of Lithuania | Eleanor of Austria; 1653–1697 | Charles V 1643–1690; Duke of Lorraine
Charles II; 1661–1700; King of Spain | Margaret Theresa of Spain; 1651–1673 | Leopold I 1640–1705; King of Germany; Holy Roman Emperor r. 1658–1705 | Claudia Felicitas of Austria; 1653–1676 | Eleonor Magdalene of Neuburg; 1655–1720 | Leopold; 1679–1729; Duke of Lorraine | Élisabeth Charlotte d'Orléans; 1676–1744
Maximilian II; 1662–1726; Elector of Bavaria | Maria Antonia of Austria; 1669–1692 | Wilhelmine Amalia of Brunswick; 1673–1742 | Joseph I 1678–1711; King of Germany r. 1690–1711; Holy Roman Emperor r. 1705–1711 | Charles VI; 1685–1740; King of Germany; Holy Roman Emperor r. 1711–1740 | Elisabeth Christine of Brunswick; 1691–1750 | Maria Elisabeth of Austria; 1680–1741 | Maria Anna of Austria; 1683–1754 | John V 1689–1750; King of Portugal | Maria Magdalena of Austria; 1689–1743
Wittelsbach | Lorraine
Charles VII; 1697–1745; King of Germany; Holy Roman Emperor r. 1742–1745 | Maria Amalia of Austria; 1701–1756 | Maria Josepha of Austria; 1699–1757 | Augustus III; 1696–1763; King of Poland; Grand Duke of Lithuania | Maria Theresa; 1717–1780; Archduchess of Austria | Francis I 1708–1765; Archduke of Austria; King of Germany; Holy Roman Emperor r. 1745–1765 | Maria Anna of Austria; 1718–1744 | Charles Alexander of Lorraine; 1712–1780
Charles III; 1716–1788; King of Spain | Maria Amalia of Saxony; 1724–1760 | Maria Anna of Austria; 1738–1789 | Maria Christina; 1742–1798; Duchess of Teschen | Albert Casimir; 1738–1822; Duke of Teschen | Maria Elisabeth of Austria; 1743–1808 | Charles Joseph of Austria; 1745–1761 | Maria Amalia of Austria; 1746–1804 | Ferdinand; 1751–1802; Duke of Parma
Habsburg-Lorraine
Maria Josepha of Bavaria; 1739–1767 | Joseph II; 1741–1790; Archduke of Austria; King of Germany r. 1764–1790; Holy Roman Emperor r. 1765–1790 | Isabella of Parma; 1741–1763 | Maria Luisa of Spain; 1745–1792 | Leopold II; 1747–1792; Archduke of Austria; King of Germany; Holy Roman Emperor r. 1790–1792 | Ferdinand I 1751–1825; King of the Two Sicilies | Maria Carolina of Austria; 1752–1814 | Ferdinand; 1754–1806; Duke of Breisgau | Marie Antoinette; 1755–1793 | Louis XVI; 1754–1793; King of France | Maximilian Francis of Austria; 1756–1801
Rudolf of Austria; 1788–1831 | Charles; 1771–1847; Duke of Teschen | Alexander Leopold of Austria; 1772–1795 | Francis II; 1768–1835; Archduke, then Emperor of Austria; Holy Roman Emperor r. 1792–1806 | Maria Theresa of Naples and Sicily; 1772–1807 | Joseph; 1776–1847; Palatine of Hungary | Ferdinand III; 1769–1824; Grand Duke of Tuscany | Luisa of Naples and Sicily; 1773–1802 | Anton Victor of Austria; 1779–1835 | John; 1782–1859; Imperial regent | Rainer Joseph of Austria; 1783–1853
Bonaparte
Napoleon I 1769–1821; Protector of the Confederation of the Rhine r. 1806–1813 | Marie Louise; 1791–1847; Duchess of Parma | Ferdinand I 1793–1875; President of the German Confederation; Emperor of Austria r. 1835–1848 | Maria Anna of Savoy; 1803–1884 | Maria Anna of Austria; 1804–1858 | Clementina of Austria; 1798–1881 | Leopold; 1790–1851; Prince of Salerno | Maximilian I Joseph; 1756–1825; King of Bavaria | Caroline of Baden; 1776–1841 | Frederick William III; 1770–1840; King of Prussia
Hohenzollern
Pedro I the Liberator; 1798–1834; Emperor of Brazil | Maria Leopoldina of Austria; 1797–1826 | Marie Caroline of Austria; 1801–1832 | Franz Karl; Archduke of Austria; 1802–1878 | Sophie of Bavaria; 1805–1872 | Ludovika of Bavaria; 1808–1892 | Maximilian Joseph; 1808–1888; Duke in Bavaria | Victoria; 1819–1901; Queen of the United Kingdom | Elisabeth Ludovika of Bavaria; 1801–1873 | Frederick William IV; 1795–1861; King of Prussia; President of the Erfurt Union r. 1849–1850 | Wilhelm I 1797–1888; King of Prussia; President of the North German Confederation; German Emperor r. 1867–1888 | Augusta of Saxe-Weimar-Eisenach; 1811–1890
Maximilian I 1832–1867; Emperor of Mexico | Karl Ludwig of Austria; 1833–1896 | Franz Joseph I 1830–1916; President of the German Confederation; Emperor of Austria r. 1848–1916 | Elisabeth of Austria; 1837–1898 | Victoria; 1840–1901; Princess Royal | Frederick III; 1831–1888; German Emperor r. 1888 | Frederick I 1826–1907; Grand Duke of Baden | Louise of Prussia; 1838–1923
Otto Franz; 1865–1906; Archduke of Austria | Franz Ferdinand; 1863–1914; Archduke of Austria | Leopold of Bavaria; 1846–1930 | Gisela of Austria; 1856–1932 | Rudolf; 1858–1889; Crown Prince of Austria | Stéphanie of Belgium; 1864–1945 | Marie Valerie of Austria; 1868–1924 | Franz Salvator of Austria; 1866–1939 | Augusta Victoria of Schleswig; 1858–1921 | Wilhelm II; 1859–1941; German Emperor r. 1888–1918 | Hermine Reuss of Greiz; 1887–1947
Charles I 1887–1922; Emperor of Austria r. 1916–1918 | Charlotte of Prussia; 1860–1919 | Bernhard III; 1851–1928; Duke of Saxe-Meiningen | Henry of Prussia; 1862–1929 | Irene of Hesse and by Rhine; 1866–1953 | Viktoria of Prussia; 1866–1929 | Adolf of Schaumburg-Lippe; 1859–1916 | Sophia of Prussia; 1870–1932 | Constantine I 1868–1923; King of the Hellenes | Margaret of Prussia; 1872–1954 | Frederick Charles; 1868–1940; King of Finland
Wilhelm; 1882–1951; German Crown Prince | Cecilie of Mecklenburg-Schwerin; 1886–1954 | Eitel Friedrich of Prussia; 1883–1942 | Sophia Charlotte of Oldenburg; 1879–1964 | Adalbert of Prussia; 1884–1948 | Adelaide of Saxe-Meiningen; 1891–1971 | August Wilhelm of Prussia; 1887–1949 | Alexandra Victoria of Schleswig-Holstein-Sonderburg-Glücksburg; 1887–1957 | Oskar of Prussia; 1888–1958 | Ina Marie von Bassewitz; 1888–1973 | Joachim of Prussia; 1890–1920 | Marie Auguste of Anhalt; 1898–1983

== See also ==
- Family tree of British monarchs
- Family tree of French monarchs
- List of monarchs of Germany

== Sources ==
- Schneidmüller, Bernd; Weinfurter, Stefan, eds. (2003). Die deutschen Herrscher des Mittelalters: Historische Portraits von Heinrich I. bis Maximilian I. (919–1519) (in German). Munich: C.H. Beck. ISBN 978-3-406-50958-2.
- Schwennicke, Detlev (1998). Europäische Stammtafeln, Neue Folge (in German). Vol. I.1. Frankfurt am Main: Vittorio Klostermann.
- Wilson, Peter H. (2016). Heart of Europe: A History of the Holy Roman Empire. Cambridge, MA: Belknap Press of Harvard University Press. ISBN 978-0-674-05809-5.
