= Bérenger I of Ivois =

9th-century Count of Ivois

Bérenger I (died 882 or before) was the first known Count of Ivois. It is conjectured that Bérenger is the same person as Berengar I of Neustria, son of Gebhard, Count of Lahngau.

A charter dated 18 Sep 882 under which Hildebertus filius quondam Berengarii comitis [Hildebert, son of the late Count Berenger] donated property [Wavrense near the river] to the Saint-Vanne Abbey in Verdun is subscribed by Stephanus comes, Matfridus comes…[Earl Stephen, Earl Matfrid] both of whom appear to have been closely connected with the family of Adalardo Adalard the Seneschal who are described as propinquis [relatives] of Berengar in the Annales Bertiniani. Note that Adalhard’s grandsons were Stephen and Matfred. The necrology of Verdun Cathedral records the death of Berengarius comes qui dedit fratribus Superiacum [Count Bérenger, who donated Souvret].

The Annales Bertiniani also record that Adalardo Yrmintrudis reginæ avunculo [Adalard the Seneschal] was a relative of the brothers Udo, Berengar and Waldo who were expelled from Germany in 865 and fought the Vikings in 865. This is compelling evidence that Bérenger I, Count of Ivois, is the same person as Berengar I of Neustria.

The names of the wife or wives of Bérenger are not known. Bérenger is believed to have had at least two children:

- Hildebert, Count of Ivois
- Bérenger II (d. before 18 Sept 882)

If the two Bérenger’s are indeed the same person, then this list of children would include Oda, wife of Arnulf the Bad, King of East Francia, disputed King of Italy and disputed Holy Roman Emperor, and mother of Louis the Child.
