= List of marches =

This is a list of marches. In the Middle Ages, marches were any type of borderland between realms, or a neutral zone under joint control of two states. Marches served a political purpose, such as providing warning of military incursions, or regulating cross-border trade.

== Northeastern marches ==
At the beginning of his rule as king of Germany, Otto I tried to reorganize his realm to prepare an expansion to the East. At the beginning of the year 937, he created two marches: the March of the Billungen, given to Hermann Billung, later Duke of Saxony; and the Eastern march, given to Gero. In 961, when Billung became Duke of Saxony, his March was merged with the duchy. In the case of Gero, Otto I, now emperor, decided the division of his territories, greatly expanded since 937.

- March of Billung (937–961): Carved from the Duchy of Saxony, then merged back.
  - 937-961: Hermann Billung
- Danish March, German buffer zone against the Danes
- March of Gero, sometimes called Nordmark or Ostmark (937–965). Carved from the Duchy of Saxony, then divided in five marches.
  - 937-965: Gero
- Nordmark, later known as March of Brandenburg (from 965): Carved from the March of Gero.
  - 965-985: Dietrich von Haldensleben
  - 985-1003: Lothar I of Walbeck
- Ostmark, sometime confused with Nordmark, or with the Bavarian Ostmark (Austria), later the Margraviate of Lusatia (from 965). Carved from the March of Gero.
  - 965-979: Thietmar I
  - 979-993: Hodo I
  - 993-1015: Gero II
- Meissen, also called March of Thuringia (from 965). Carved from the March of Gero.
  - 965-979: Wigbert
  - 979-985: Rikdag
  - 985-1002: Ekkehard I
- Merseburg (965–982). Carved from the March of Gero, annexed to Meissen.
  - 965-982: Günther
- Zeitz (965–979). Carved from the March of Gero, annexed to Meissen.
  - 965-979: Wigger I
- Landsberg (1261–1347), separated from Lusatia, integrated into Meissen (later Saxony).

== Northwestern marches ==
In 861, Charles the Bald, king of France, created two marches to protect his realm from warriors coming from Brittany and Normandy. Both were named March of Neustria, but will be known as March of Brittany and March of Normandy. In 863, the king created the March of Flanders.

- March of Brittany (861–987): Annexed to the Kingdom of France.
  - 861-866: Robert the Strong
- March of Normandy (861–987): Annexed to the Kingdom of France.
  - 861-865: Adalhard, Udo of Neustria and Berengar I of Neustria (jointly)
- March of Flanders (863–877): Downgraded to a County afterwards.
  - 863-877: Baldwin I

Three marches belonging to the Holy Roman Empire were created in the Low Countries:

- March of Antwerp (974–1190): Became part of the Duchy of Brabant.
- March of Ename (974–1033): Captured by Baldwin IV, Count of Flanders and became Imperial Flanders.
- March of Valenciennes (974–1071): Became part of the County of Hainaut.

== Southeastern marches ==
- Ostmark, later raised to a duchy; became known as Austria.
- Styria, later raised to a duchy.
- Carinthia (889–1012), later a duchy.
  - Mark an der Sann, later the County of Cilli, then integrated into Styria.
  - Mark an der Drau; later integrated into Styria.
- Friuli (776–927)
- Avar - Pannonia
- Carniola (927–1071): carved from Friuli, annexed to the Patriarchy of Aquileia. Later formed part of the Habsburg domains before being raised to a duchy.
  - Windic March, a region of the March of Carniola
- Istria (1062–1209): carved from Carinthia, annexed to the Patriarchate of Aquileia.
- Verona (1061–1250): created by the Emperor as a gift, annexed to Austria.
- Tuscany (931–1173): created by the Italian king Hugh of Arles for his brother, then annexed to the Empire.
  - 931-936: Boso of Tuscany
- Mantua (1433–1530)
- Ivrea (888–1015): created by Guy III of Spoleto

== Southwestern marches ==
- Spanish March, also named Gothia and Septimania (806–885): Created to protect the Frankish heartland from Al-Andalus invasions, merged into Aquitaine.
  - 806-816: Beggo of Paris
  - 820-825: Rampon, Count of Barcelona
  - 826-832: Bernard of Septimania
  - 832-835: Berengar von Toulouse
  - 835-844: Bernard of Septimania
- Upper March (al-Tagr al-A'la al-Andalusi), centered on Zaragoza: created to protect the Emirate of Cordoba from Frankish coastal and east-Pyrenees invasions. The northernmost part of the Upper March was called the Distant or Farthest March (al-Tagr al-Aqsa)
- Middle March (al-Tagr al-Awsat), centered on Toledo and later Medinaceli: created to protect the Emirate of Cordoba from invasions from the west-Pyrenees and Asturias.
- Lower March (al-Tagr al-Adna), centered on Mérida: created to protect the Emirate of Cordoba from Asturian incursions.
- Castile, named for the fortifications typical of a march: created to protect the Asturian kingdom from Cordoban invasions. It developed into a county, then a kingdom.
- Provence (905–1105): From 975 it became a family title, the eldest bearing it. It disappeared after the death of Raymond IV of Toulouse.
  - 905-936: Hugh of Italy
  - 936-948: Hugh, Duke of Burgundy
  - 948-975: Conrad of Burgundy
  - 975-993: William I of Provence
  - 993-1005: Rotbold II of Provence
  - 1005-1014: Rotbold III of Provence
  - 1014-1037: William III of Provence
  - 1037-1051: Fulk Bertrand of Provence
  - 1051-1061: Geoffrey I of Provence
  - 1061-1094: William Bertrand of Provence
  - 1094-1105: Raymond IV of Toulouse
- Aquitaine (885–886): Successor to the Spanish March, became a Duchy.
  - Bernard Plantapilosa

== English marches ==
- Welsh Marches
- Scottish Marches

== March as modern-era regional toponym ==
- Altmark (Old March), region in northern Saxony-Anhalt
- Altmarkkreis Salzwedel, district of Saxony-Anhalt
- Bevis Marks, a street in London on the boundary of a former monastic estate
- Denmark, a sovereign state
- Friuli-Venezia Giulia, a region of Italy combining the former regions of Friuli and Venezia Giulia, known in English as the Julian March
- Grenzmark Posen-West Prussia, province of Prussia (1922–1938)
- Hedmark, until 2020 a county of Norway
- Kurmark (Electoral March), former expression for a region in today's western Brandenburg
- Lappmarken, a region and former governorate in northern Sweden
- March of Brandenburg (colloquial, but not official), state of Germany
- Marche, region of Italy
- Mittelmark (Middle March), region in central Brandenburg
- Pomarkku (Påmark), a municipality of Finland
- Potsdam-Mittelmark, district of Brandenburg
- New March, former expression for a region in western Poland
- Steiermark, a province of Austria
- Telemark, a county of Norway
- Finnmark, a county of Norway
- Uckermark, a region in northeastern Brandenburg and southern Vorpommern
- Uckermark (district), a district of Brandenburg

== See also ==
- Commandery (jùn), the equivalent Chinese territory
