= Hildebert =

Hildebert is a masculine given name of Germanic origin. It may refer to:

- Hildebert (bishop of Cambrai) (r. 712–715)
- Hildebert, Count of Ivois (fl. 882)
- Hildebert (archbishop of Mainz) (died 937)
- Hildebert (abbot of Saint-Ouen) (died 1006)
- Hildebert I of Mont-Saint-Michel, abbot (r. 1009–1017)
- Hildebert II of Mont-Saint-Michel, abbot (r. 1017–1023)
- Hildebert of Lavardin (died 1133), bishop of Le Mans, archbishop of Tours and theologian
- Hildebert and Everwin (12th century), Moravian artists
