= Zwentibold =

King of Lotharingia from 895 to 900

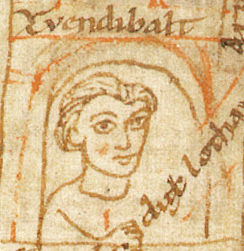
- Zwentibold dux Lotharingiae, from the Chronicon Universale, a 12th-century manuscript by Ekkehard of Aura

King of Lotharingia
- Reign: 895–900
- Predecessor: Arnulf of Carinthia
- Successor: Louis the Child
- Born: c. 870
- Died: 13 August 900
- Burial: Susteren Abbey
- Spouse: Oda (daughter of Duke Otto I of Saxony)
- Dynasty: Carolingian
- Father: Arnulf of Carinthia
- Mother: Vinburga

Zwentibold (Zventibold, Zwentibald, Swentiboldo, Sventibaldo, Sanderbald; c. 870 – 13 August 900), a member of the Carolingian dynasty, was the illegitimate son of Emperor Arnulf. In 895, his father granted him the Kingdom of Lotharingia, which he ruled until his death.

== Life ==
=== Early life ===
Zwentibold was born during the long reign of his great-grandfather, King Louis the German in East Francia. He was the first-born, yet illegitimate, son of Arnulf of Carinthia and his concubine Vinburga. Zwentibold's father was an illegitimate son of Carloman of Bavaria, the eldest son of Louis the German. Zwentibold was named after his godfather Svatopluk, ruler of Great Moravia (Zwentibold being a Frankish transcription of Svatopluk). After Louis' death in 876, Carloman ruled over the East Frankish territory of Bavaria and ceded the adjacent marches of Pannonia and Carinthia (former Carantania) to his son Arnulf. In 887 Arnulf succeeded the incapable King Charles the Fat as king of East Francia.

When Zwentibold came of age, he intervened in the scramble for the throne in West Francia between Count Odo of Paris and Charles the Simple, but they began to cooperate against Zwentibold, when it became apparent that he intended to become king of West Francia. The eldest son of Arnulf was at first marked out for his succession in East Francia. According to the 870 Treaty of Meerssen and the 880 Treaty of Ribemont, the Lotharingian kingdom of former Middle Francia had fallen to the East Frankish realm. When in 893 King Arnulf's wife Ota gave birth to his legitimate son and successor Louis the Child, Zwentibold in compensation received the Lotharingian royal title, which last had been held by Lothair II.

=== King of Lotharingia ===
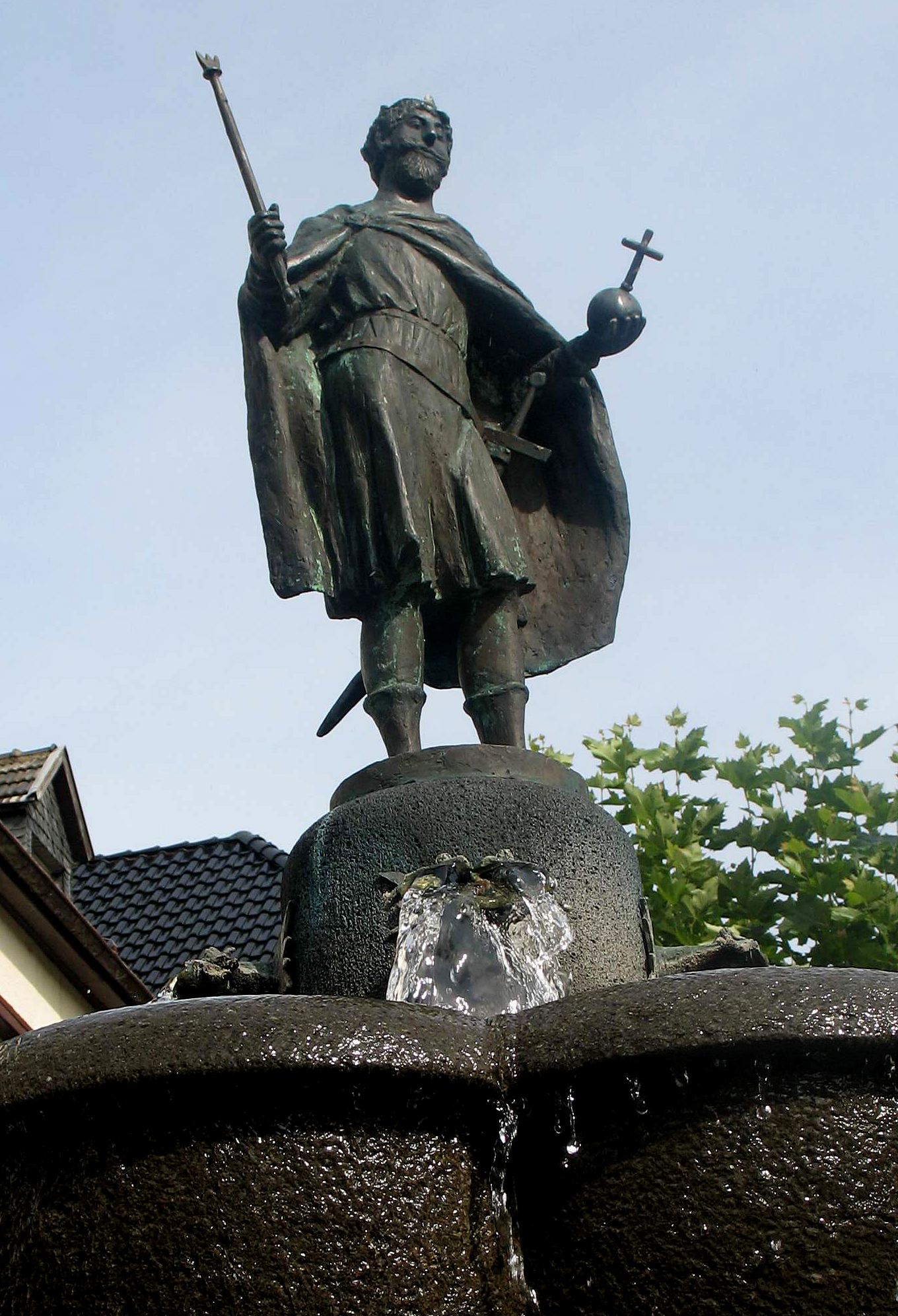
Zwentibold fountain in Münstereifel

In the summer of 893 Arnulf received pleas of intervention against Wido of Spoleto from Pope Formosus and Berengar of Friuli, king of Italy. Arnulf sent Zwentibold down the Brenner Pass with an army who joined forces with Berengar in Verona. The two marched to Wido's capital, Pavia, and besieged it unsuccessfully, finally abandoning the siege. According to Liutprand of Cremona, Zwentibold accepted money from Wido in order to leave, although it is not clear if it was in the form of a personal bribe or a tribute to his father. Zwentibold's retreat was nonetheless seen as a failure, but after learning details of the campaign, Arnulf summoned a stronger army and personally led it to Italy and took Pavia a few months later.

As a part of the plans to integrate Lotharingia into the East Frankish realm, the rule of King Zwentibold was enforced by his father, supported by the archbishops Herman I of Cologne and Ratbod of Trier, against the resistance of the local nobility. As he helped the common population too much, he began to be hated in a few years. He was fighting unruly nobles when his father Arnulf died in 899 and the legitimate son Louis the Child became king of East Francia at the age of six.

=== Death and legacy ===
Zwentibold attempted to take advantage of the succession of his minor half-brother to establish complete independence for his Lotharingian kingdom. However, after he had lost his father's backing, the entire nobility supported Louis and asked him to intervene. In 900, Count Reginar I of Hainault and Odoacer rose against Zwentibold and slew him in battle that year, on the river Meuse, near present-day Susteren. His remains are buried at Susteren Abbey.

After Zwentibold's death, King Louis the Child ruled over Lotharingia. However, under his reign the East Frankish realm disintegrated and from 903 Zwentibold's kingdom was administered by the Lahngau Count Gebhard, a scion of the Conradine dynasty, who received the title of Duke of Lorraine.

== Family ==
In 897, he married Oda, a daughter of Duke Otto I of Saxony. He had three daughters, who are mentioned in the Gesta episcoporum Leodensium:

- Benedetta (born c. 898), abbey of Susteren
- Cecilia (born c. 899), abbey of Susteren
- Relenda (born c. 900)

They also had one son, named Otto de Lorraine. He died in 949.

== Sources ==
- Bauer, Thomas (2005). "Zwentibold (870–900), König von Lotharingien: Ein merkwürdiger Heiliger". In Irsigler, Franz; Minn, Gisela (eds.). Porträt einer europäischen Kernregion: Der Rhein-Mass-Raum in historischen Lebensbildern (in German). Trier: Kliomedia. pp. 16–38. ISBN 3-89890-087-8.
- Collins, Roger (1999). Early Medieval Europe 300–1000 (2nd ed.). Palgrave Macmillan.
- Greer, Sarah (2021). Commemorating Power in Early Medieval Saxony: Writing and Rewriting the Past at Gandersheim and Quedlinburg. Oxford University Press. ISBN 978-0-19-885013-7. xiv
- Annales Fuldenses, sive Annales regni Francorum orientalis, 10th century.
- Liutprand of Cremona, Antapodosis, 10th century

Zwentibold Carolingian Born: c. 870 Died: 13 August 900
Regnal titles
Preceded by Arnulf	King of Lotharingia; 895–900	Vacant Title next held by Louis the Child (King); Gebhard (as Duke of Lorraine)
Preceded by Arnulf	Markgraf of Carinthia; 888–900	Vacant Title next held by Louis the Child
