= Louis IV of Germany =

Louis IV of Germany may refer to:

- Louis the Child, the last Carolingian king of Germany, or rather of East Franks
- Louis IV, Holy Roman Emperor
