= Bělov =

- Municipality
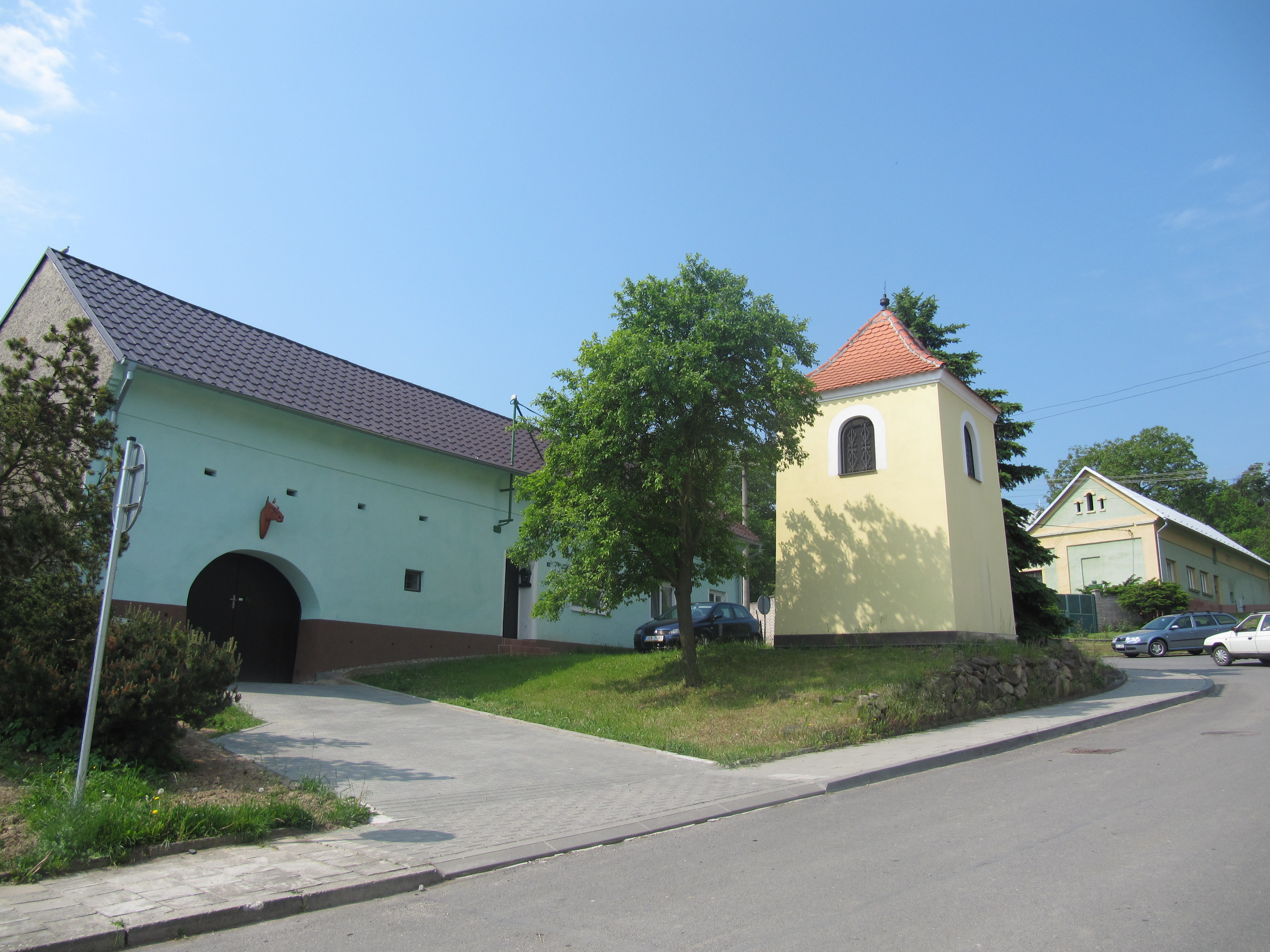
- Belfry in the centre of Bělov

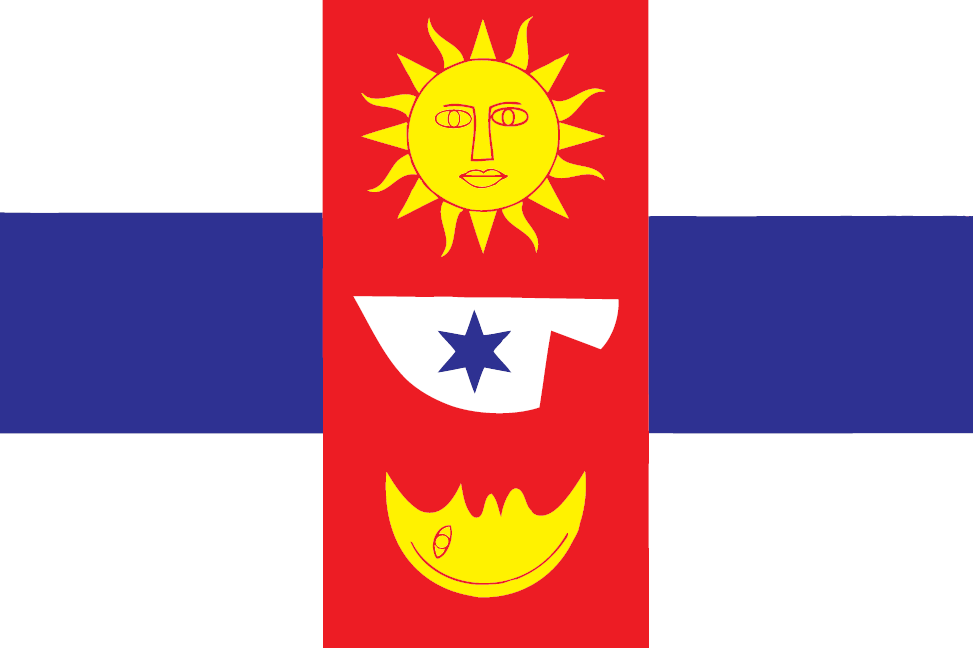
- Flag Coat of arms

- Location in the Czech Republic
- Coordinates: 49°12′58″N 17°29′5″E
- Country: Czech Republic
- Region: Zlín
- District: Zlín
- First mentioned: 1141

Area
  - Total: 3.45 km^{2} (1.33 sq mi)
- Elevation: 234 m (768 ft)

Population (2026-01-01)
  - Total: 323
  - Density: 93.6/km^{2} (242/sq mi)
- Time zone: UTC+1 (CET)
  - Summer (DST): UTC+2 (CEST)
- Postal code: 768 21
- Website: www.belov.cz

Bělov is a municipality and village in Zlín District in the Zlín Region of the Czech Republic. It has about 300 inhabitants.

Bělov lies approximately 14 kilometres (9 mi) west of Zlín and 241 km (150 mi) south-east of Prague.

== History ==
The first written mention of Bělov is in a deed of Bishop Jindřich Zdík from 1141.

== Demographics ==
Historical population
Year	Pop.	±%
1869	367	—
1880	373	+1.6%
1890	401	+7.5%
1900	441	+10.0%
1910	419	−5.0%
1921	458	+9.3%
1930	417	−9.0%
1950	372	−10.8%
1961	375	+0.8%
1970	318	−15.2%
1980	299	−6.0%
1991	242	−19.1%
2001	242	+0.0%
2011	301	+24.4%
2021	317	+5.3%
Source: Censuses
