= Margrave =

Historic military and noble title in Europe

In the German nobility, margrave was a rank equivalent to marquess. It originated as the medieval title for the military commander assigned to maintain the defence of one of the border provinces of the Holy Roman Empire or a kingdom. That position became hereditary in certain feudal families in the Empire and the title came to be borne by rulers of some Imperial principalities until the abolition of the Empire in 1806 (e.g., Margrave of Brandenburg, Margrave of Baden). Thereafter, those domains (originally known as marks or marches, later as margraviates or margravates) were absorbed into larger realms or the titleholders adopted titles indicative of full sovereignty.

== History ==
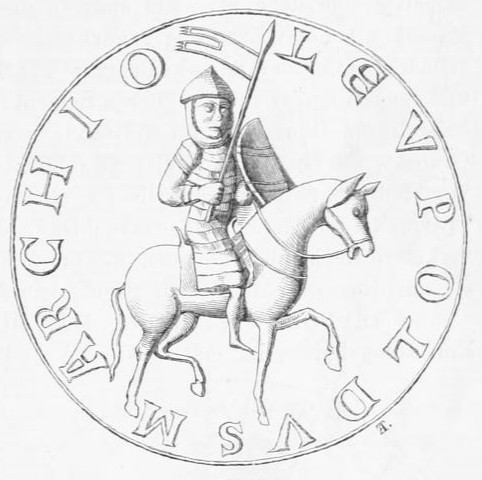
Seal of Leopold III, Margrave of Austria (r. 1095–1136), with legend LEVPOLDVS MARCHIO.

Etymologically, the word margrave (Latin: marchio, c. 1551) is the English and French form of the German noble title Markgraf (German pronunciation: [ˈmaʁkˌɡʁaːf];Mark, meaning "march" or "mark", that is, borderland, added to Graf, meaning "Count"); it is related semantically to the English title "Marcher Lord". As a noun and hereditary title, "margrave" was common among the languages of Europe, such as Spanish and Polish.

A Markgraf (margrave) originally functioned as the military governor of a Carolingian march, a medieval border province. Because the territorial integrity of the borders of the realm of a king or emperor was essential to national security, the vassal (whether a count or other lord) whose lands were on the march of the kingdom or empire was likely to be appointed a margrave and given greater responsibility for securing the border.

The greater exposure of a border province to military invasion mandated that the margrave be provided with military forces and autonomy of action (political as well as military) greater than those accorded other lords of the realm. As a military governor, the margrave's authority often extended over a territory larger than the province proper, because of border expansion after royal wars.

The margrave thus usually came to exercise commensurately greater politico-military power than other noblemen. The margrave maintained the greater armed forces and fortifications required for repelling invasion, which increased his political strength and independence relative to the monarch. Moreover, a margrave might expand his sovereign's realm by conquering additional territory, sometimes more than he might retain as a personal domain, thus allowing him to endow his vassals with lands and resources in return for their loyalty to him; the consequent wealth and power might allow the establishment of a de facto near-independent principality of his own.

Most marches and their margraves arose along the eastern borders of the Carolingian Empire and the successor Holy Roman Empire. The Breton Mark on the Atlantic Ocean and the border of peninsular Brittany and the Marca Hispanica on the Muslim frontier (including Catalonia) are notable exceptions. The Spanish March was most important during the early stages of the peninsular Reconquista of Iberia: ambitious margraves based in the Pyrenees took advantage of the disarray in Muslim Al-Andalus to extend their territories southward, leading to the establishment of the Christian kingdoms that would become unified Spain in the fifteenth century. The Crusaders created new and perilous borders susceptible to holy war against the Saracens; they thus had use for such border marches as the Greek Margraviate of Bodonitsa (1204–1414).

As territorial borders stabilised in the late Middle Ages, marches began to lose their primary military importance; but the entrenched families who held the office of margrave gradually converted their marches into hereditary fiefs, comparable in all but name to duchies. In an evolution similar to the rises of dukes, landgraves, counts palatine, and Fürsten (ruling princes), these margraves became substantially independent rulers of states under the nominal overlordship of the Holy Roman Emperor.

Holy Roman Emperor Charles IV's Golden Bull of 1356 recognized the Margrave of Brandenburg as an elector of the Empire. Possession of an electorate carried membership in the highest "college" within the Imperial Diet, the main prerogative of which was the right to elect, along with a few other powerful princes and prelates, the non-hereditary Emperor whenever death or abdication created a vacancy on the Imperial throne. Mark Brandenburg became the nucleus of the House of Hohenzollern's later Kingdom of Prussia and the springboard to their eventual accession as German Emperors in 1871.

Another original march also developed into one of the most powerful states in Central Europe: the Margraviate of Austria. Its rulers, the House of Habsburg, rose to obtain a de facto monopoly on election to the throne of the Holy Roman Empire. They also inherited several, mainly Eastern European and Burgundian, principalities. Austria was originally called Marchia Orientalis in Latin, the "eastern borderland", as (originally roughly the present Lower-) Austria formed the easternmost reach of the Holy Roman Empire, extending to the lands of the Magyars and the Slavs (since the 19th century, Marchia Orientalis has been translated as Ostmark by some Germanophones, though medieval documents attest only to the vernacular name Ostarrîchi). Another march in southeast, Styria, still appears as Steiermark in German today.

The margraves of Brandenburg and Meissen eventually became, respectively, the kings of (originally 'in') Prussia and Saxony.

== Rank ==
The title of margrave, no longer a military office, evolved into a rank in the Holy Roman Empire's nobility; higher than Graf (count), it was equivalent to such associated compound titles as Landgrave, Palsgrave, and Gefürsteter Graf, yet remained lower than Herzog (duke) and even, officially, lower than Fürst.

A few nobles in southern Austria and northern Italy, whose suzerain was the Emperor, received from him the title of margrave, usually translated in Italian as marquis (marchese): those who reigned as virtual sovereigns (Marquis of Mantua, Marquis of Montferrat, Marquis of Saluzzo, Marquis of Fosdinovo) exercised authority closer to the dynastic jurisdiction associated in modern Europe with the margrave, while some non-ruling nobles (e.g., Burgau, Pallavicini, Piatti) retained use of the margravial title but held the non-sovereign status of a marquis.

== Usage ==
By the 19th century, the sovereigns in Germany, Italy and Austria had all adopted "higher" titles, and not a single sovereign margraviate remained. Although the title remained part of the official style of such monarchs as the German Emperors, Kings of Saxony, and Grand Dukes of Baden, it fell into desuetude as the primary title of members of any reigning family.

The children of Charles Frederick, Grand Duke of Baden by his second, morganatic wife, Luise Karoline Geyer von Geyersberg, only legally shared their mother's title of Imperial Count von Hochberg from 1796, and were not officially elevated to the title of margrave until 1817 when they were publicly de-morganitised. But their father had allowed its use for his morganatic children at his own court in Karlsruhe from his assumption of the grand ducal crown in 1806, simultaneously according to the princely title to the dynastic sons of his first marriage. However, from 1817 his male-line descendants of both marriages were internationally recognised as entitled to the princely prefix, which all used henceforth.

The title of Margrave of Baden has been borne as a title of pretence only by the head of the House of Zähringen since the death of the last reigning Grand Duke, Frederick II, in 1928. Likewise, Margrave of Meissen is used as a title of pretence by the claimant to the Kingdom of Saxony since the death in exile of its last monarch, King Fredrick Augustus III, in 1932.

In 1914, the Imperial German Navy commissioned the dreadnought battleship SMS Markgraf, whose name commemorated this title. She fought in World War I and was interned and scuttled at Scapa Flow after the war.

== Translations ==
The etymological heir of the margrave in Europe's nobilities is the marquis, also introduced in countries that never had any margraviates, such as the British marquess; their languages may use one or two words, e.g. French margrave or marquis. The margrave/marquis ranked below its nation's equivalent of "duke" (Britain, France, Germany, Portugal, Scandinavia, Spain) or of "prince" (Belgium, Italy), but above "count" or "earl".

The wife of a margrave is a margravine (Markgräfin in German, but margrave in French). In Germany and Austria, where titles were borne by all descendants in the male line of the original grantee, men and women alike, each daughter was a Markgräfin as each son was a Markgraf.

The title of margrave is translated below in languages which distinguish margrave from marquis, the latter being the English term for a Continental noble of rank equivalent to a British marquess. In languages which sometimes use marquis to translate margrave, that fact is indicated below in parentheses):

Language	Equivalent of margrave	Equivalent of margravine
Afrikaans	markgraaf / markies	markgravin / markiesin
Arabic	مرزبان (marzubān)	–
Armenian	մարզպետ (marzpet)	–
Catalan	marcgravi / marquès	marcgravina / marquesa
Chinese	侯 (hóu)	侯妃 (hóu fēi)
Croatian	markgrof / markiz	markgrofica / markiza
Czech	markrabě / markýz	markraběnka / markýza
Danish	markgreve	markgrevinde
Dutch	markgraaf / markies	markgravin / markiezin
English	margrave / marquess	margravine / marchioness
Esperanto	margrafo / markizo	margrafino / markizino
Estonian	markkrahv	markkrahvinna
Finnish	rajakreivi / markiisi	rajakreivitär / markiisitar
French	Marquis	Marquise
German	Markgraf	Markgräfin
Greek	µαργράβος (margrávos) / µαρκήσιος (markḗsios)	µαρκησία (markēsía)
Hungarian	őrgróf / márki	őrgrófnő / márkinő
Icelandic	markgreifi	markgreifynja
Irish	margraf	ban-margraf
Italian	margravio / marchese	margravia / marchesa
Japanese	辺境伯 (henkyō haku)	辺境伯夫人 (henkyō hakufujin) / 辺境伯妃 (henkyō haku-hi)
Korean	변경백 (byeon-gyeongbaeg)	변경백부인 (byeon-gyeongbaegbu-in)
Latin	marchio	marcisa
Latvian	markgrāfs / marķīzs	markgrāfiene / marķīze
Lithuanian	markgrafas / markizas	markgrafienė / markizė
Macedonian	маркгроф (markgrof)	маркгрофица (markgrofica)
Norwegian	markgreve / marki	markgrevinne / markise
Persian	مرزبان (marzoban or marzbān)	–
Polish	margrabia / markiz	margrabina / markiza
Portuguese	margrave / marquês	margravina / marquesa
Romanian	margraf	–
Serbian	маркгроф (markgrof)	маркгрофица (markgrofica)
Slovak	markgróf	markgrófka
Slovene	mejni grof / markiz	mejna grofica / markiza
Spanish	margrave / marqués	margravina / marquesa
Swedish	markgreve / markis	markgrevinna / markisinna
Vietnamese	hầu	–

== Variations ==
- Several states have had analogous institutions, sometimes also rendered in English as margrave. For example, on England's Celtic borders (Welsh Marches and Scottish Marches), Marcher Lords were vassals of the King of England, expected to help him defend and expand his realm. Such a lord's demesne was called a march (compare the English county palatine). The Marcher Lords were a conspicuous exception to the general structure of English feudalism as set up by William the Conqueror, who made a considerable effort to avoid having too-powerful vassals with a big contiguous territory and a strong local power base; the needs of fighting the Welsh and Scots made it necessary to have exactly this kind of vassal in the Marches, who did develop their territorial ambitions (for example those of Chester).
- The late-medieval commanders, fiefholders, of Viborg Castle in Finland (see Fief of Viborg), the bulwark of the then-Swedish realm, at the border against Novgorod, did, in practice, function as margraves. They had feudal privileges and kept all of the crown's income from the fief to use for the defence of the realm's eastern border. Its fiefholders were (almost always) descended from, or married to, the noble family of Bååt from Småland in Sweden.
- Marggrabowa is an example of a town whose name comes from a margrave. Located in the Masurian region of East Prussia, Marggrabowa was founded in 1560 by Albert, Duke of Prussia, Margrave of Brandenburg. It has since been renamed to the Polish Olecko.
- The German word Mark also has other meanings than the margrave's territorial border area, often with a territorial component, which occurs more numerously than margraviates; so its occurrence in composite place names does not necessarily imply that it was part of a margraviate as such. Uses of Mark in German names are commonly more local, as in the context of a Markgenossenschaft, which means a partially self-governing association of agricultural users of an area; the German name-component Mark can also be a truncated form of Markt 'market', as in the small town of Marksuhl in the Eisenach area of Thuringia, meaning 'market town on the river Suhl'. The non-margravial origin even applies to the County of Mark and the country of Denmark (meaning 'march of the Danes', in the sense of border area, yet never under a Margrave but the Danish national kingdom, outside the Holy Roman Empire).
- The Sassanid Persian position of marzban (marz means border, and ban means lord) or Kanarang was a position given to officials or generals who were trusted by the king and that had land, villages, and towns in far reaches of the empire. In return for their position and privilege to collect taxes, they were responsible for defending the empire from foreign intrusion.
- The Byzantine Empire had a number of fortified passes in the mountainous frontier districts called kleisoura or kleisarchy, particularly along its eastern border with the Caliphate, each headed by a kleisourarches who controlled access to inner lands. However an Exarch in the late Roman, early Eastern Roman Empire era, was the military commander and imperial governor of a region at the brink of the controlled territories, not an aristocratic lord in his own (hereditary) right.
- The Turkish title and position of uç beyi ("frontier lord"), used in early Turkish Anatolia and during the Ottoman conquest of the Balkans, is also often rendered as "margrave".
- The wife of a Margrave is called a Margravine.

== See also ==
- Burgrave
- List of marches
- Markgräflerland
