= Johann Jakob Jung =

German painter

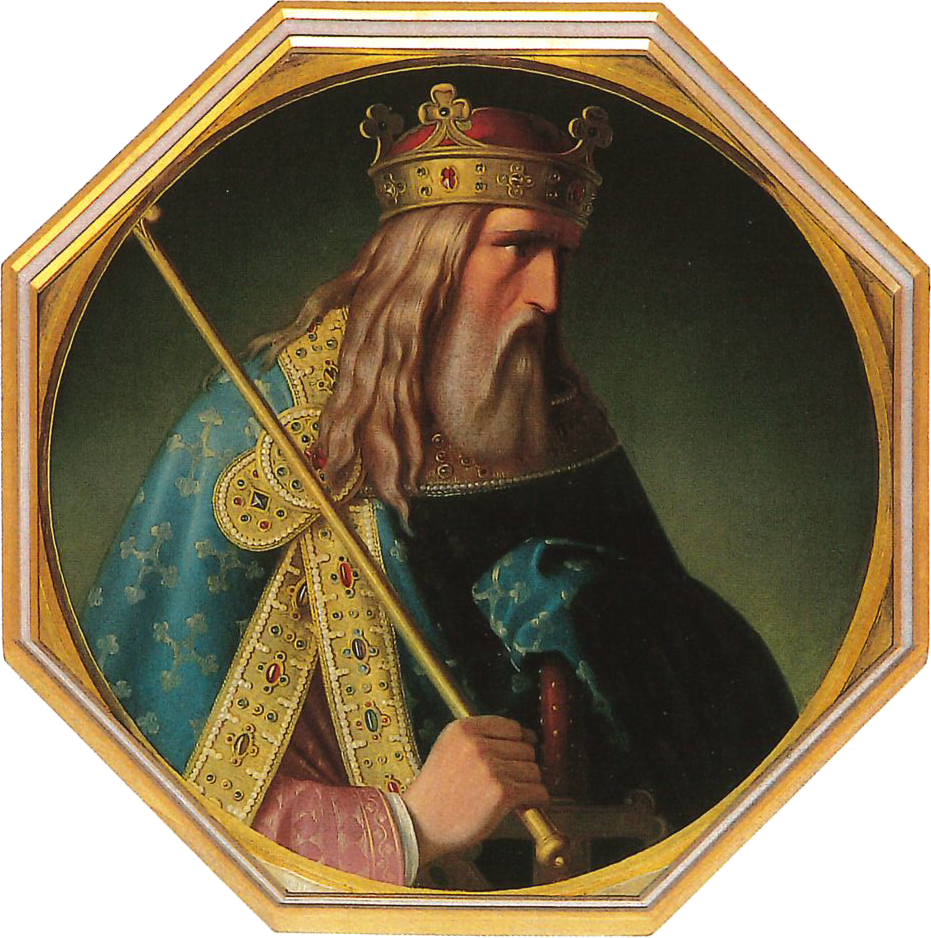
Louis the Pious

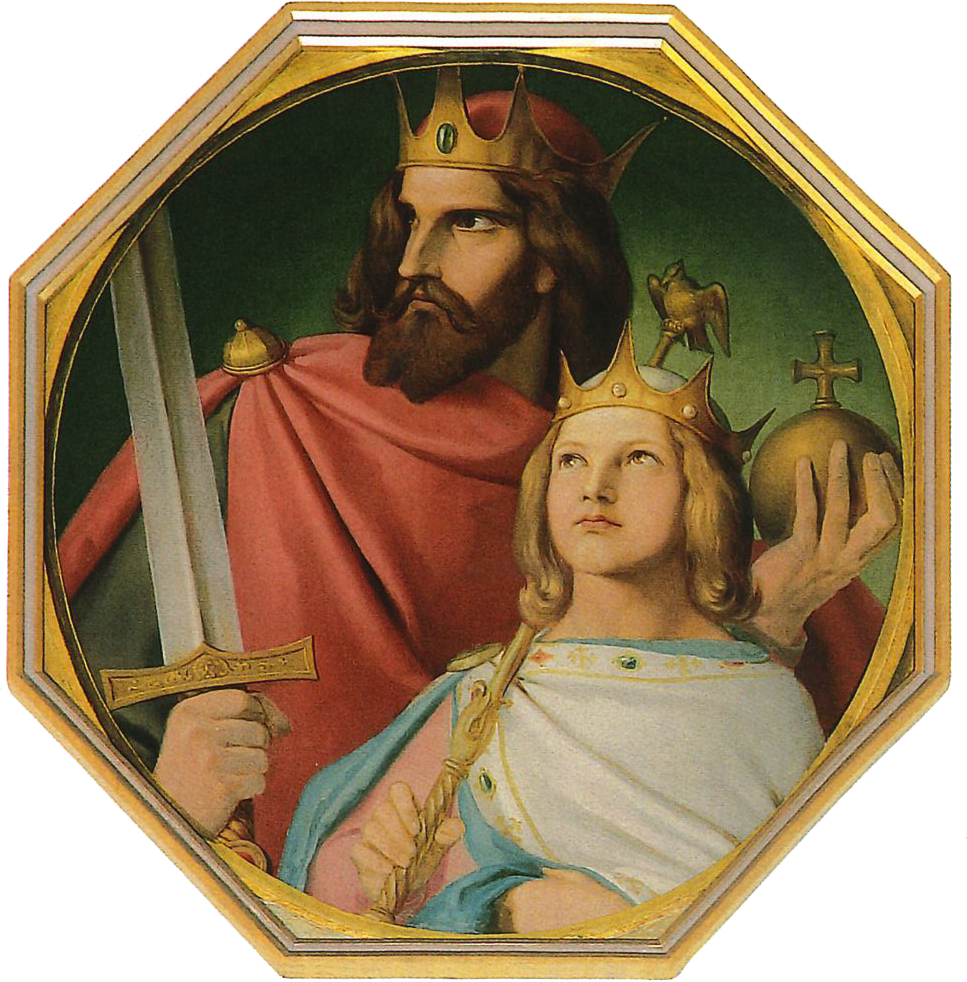
Arnulf of Carinthia and Louis the Child

Johann Jakob Jung (12 September 1819 – 29 June 1844) was a German painter, specializing in religious subjects, and a member of the Nazarene movement.

== Life and work ==
He was born in Frankfurt am Main. At an early age, he began training as a lithographer with Friedrich Carl Vogel at his "Lithographischer Anstalt" in Frankfurt. In 1834, he took lessons in painting from Philipp Veit at the Städelsches Kunstinstitut, where Veit was Director of the museum's gallery. At this time, Frankfurt had become the focal point for the Nazarene movement, which was devoted to religious art, largely of a Catholic nature. This had a decisive influence on the content of Jung's works.

The most familiar of these are oil paintings depicting Louis the Pious, Arnulf of Carinthia and Louis the Child. These may be seen at the Kaisersaal in the Römer, a medieval building in Frankfurt. He also created a portrait of Saint Cecilia in 1842.

That same year, he accepted a position as an art teacher at the Städel. His best known student there was Anton Burger. Jung died in 1844, in Frankfurt.

In 2003, a set of his drawings of camellias was offered at the auction house, Christie’s, in London and went for $245,584.
