= Gebhard, Duke of Lorraine =

9/10th-century ruler of Lotharingia (Lorraine)

Gebhard of Lahngau (c. 860/868 – 22 June 910), of the Conradine dynasty, son of Odo (aka Udo, died 879), count of Lahngau, and Judith, was himself count of Wetterau (909–910) and Rheingau (897–906) and then duke of Lotharingia (Lorraine).

In 903, Louis the Child, king of Germany, gave him the government of Lotharingia with the title of duke (Kebehart dux regni quod a multis Hlotharii dicitur). Gebhard died in battle against the Magyars, somewhere by Augsburg.

With his wife Ida, he had two children:

- Herman (died 949), duke of Swabia
- Odo (died 949), count of Wetterau (from 914), Lahngau (from 918), and Rheingau (from 917), married Cunigunda, daughter of Herbert I of Vermandois

== Sources ==
- Reuter, Timothy, ed. (2006). The New Cambridge Medieval History, c. 900–c. 1024. Vol. III. Cambridge University Press.
- Reuter, Timothy (2013). Germany in the Middle Ages, c. 800–1056. Routledge.
- Stingl, Herfried (1974). Die Entstehung der deutschen Stammesherzogtümer: am Anfang des 10 (in German). David Brown Book Company.

Gebhard, Duke of Lorraine House of Conrad Born: 888 Died: 22 June 910
Preceded by Zwentibold (as King of Lorraine)	Duke of Lotharingia; 903–910	Succeeded by Reginar
