= Horologium Olomucense =

12th-century liturgical codex

The Horologium Olomucense (Olomouc Horologium) is a medieval liturgical codex created in Olomouc in Moravia between 1136 and 1142. It is currently preserved in National Library of Sweden under shelfmark A 144.

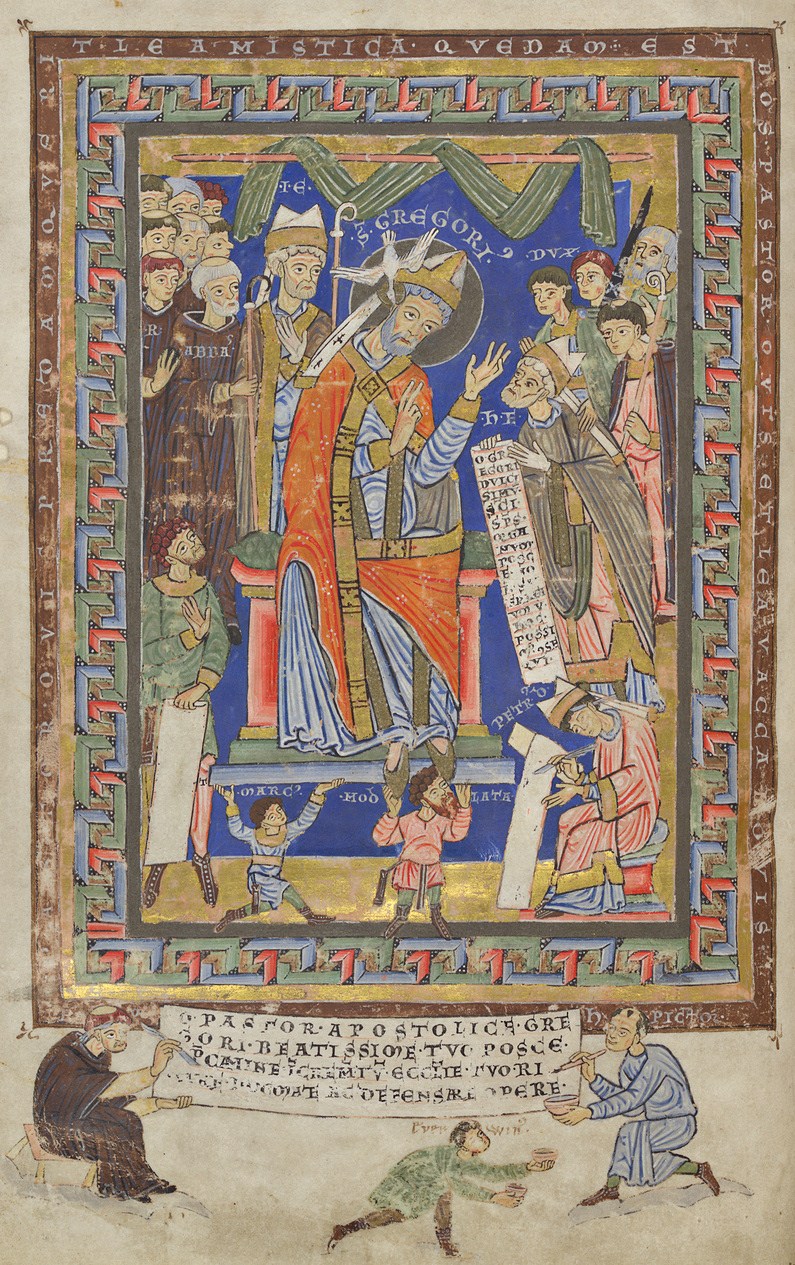
Dedicatory illustration on folio 34v

== Discovery ==
The manuscript was identified for Czech historical scholarship in the late nineteenth century by the historian Beda Dudík, who introduced it into academic literature in 1880. Since then, the codex has been the subject of researches, particularly in the field of medieval manuscript studies.

== Dating and origin ==
The Czech historian Antonín Friedl, a specialist in medieval manuscripts, dated the codex to the years 1136–1137. He attributed most of the manuscript to the so-called scribe R, whom he considered a member of the Olomouc scriptorium. Friedl's interpretation, however, is based on indirect evidence. Olomucense Horlogium would be only known manuscript connected with this scribe. It is clear that Olomoucense horologium is from Olomouc scriptorium, but existence of scribe R is not.

Another Czech historian and archivist, Jan Bistřický, dated the manuscript more broadly to the 1140s. Despite differences between their theses, both historians agree that the codex originated in the first half of the twelfth century.

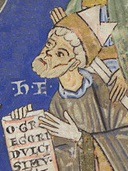
Bishop Jindřich Zdík

== Description ==
The manuscript is written on parchment and consists of 161 folios. The manuscript is dedicated to Duke of Bohemia Soběslav II. It is mainly Breviary, which is Liturgy of Hours. The codex was ordered by Bishop of Olomouc, Jindřich Zdík. The most significant part of the codex is the dedicatory illustration on folio 34v, which depicts several important figures. Amongst those represented are Pope Gregory I, Jindřich Zdík (Bishop of Olomouc), John, Bishop of Prague, the scribe R and the painter Hildebert himself. Another interesting feature is the decorated initial letter D, attributed to the painter Hildebert.

== Later history ==
During the Thirty Years' War, Swedish troops captured the city of Olomouc in 1642. As a result, the cathedral chapter's collection suffered substantial losses, including the removal of the Olomoucense Horologium, which was taken to Sweden. The manuscript has since been held in the National library of Sweden.

In 2009, the codex was temporarily returned to Olomouc as part of an exhibition dedicated to Bishop Jindřich Zdík.
