= Anton Burger (artist) =

German painter

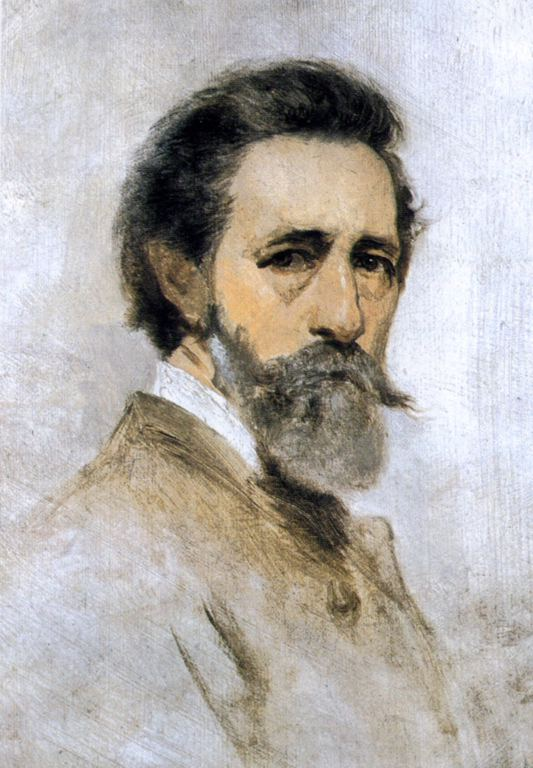
- Self-portrait (date unknown)
- Born: November 14, 1824; Free City of Frankfurt
- Died: July 6, 1905; Kronberg, Kingdom of Prussia, German Empire
- Education: Städelschule
- Spouse(s): Anna Johanna Auguste Küster (1859-1876), Pauline Fresenius (1882-1905)

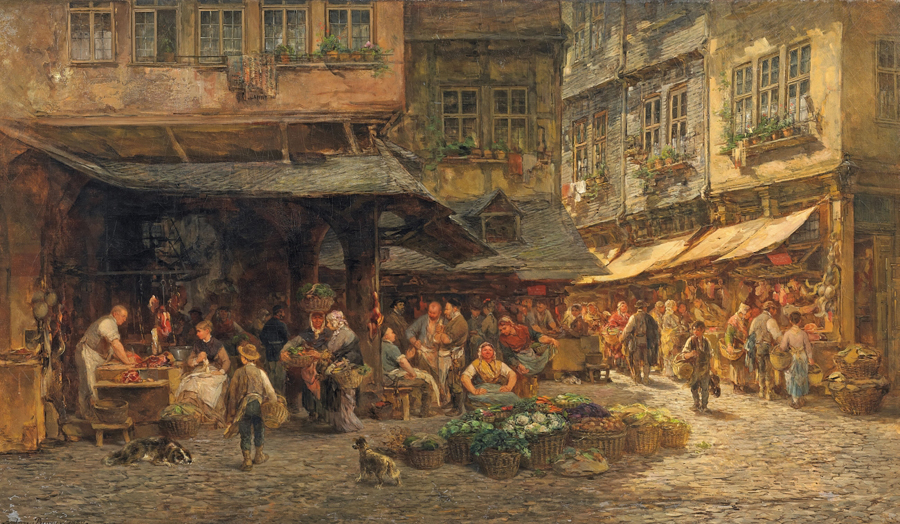
The Schirn (farmer's market) in Frankfurt (1880)

Anton Burger (14 November 1824 – 6 July 1905) was a German painter, draftsman, and etcher.

== Life ==
Burger was born in 1824 in the Free City of Frankfurt. He studied at the Städelschule from 1842 to 1846, where his teachers included Johann Jakob Jung, Jakob Becker and Philipp Veit, who suggested that he go to Munich. Burger did so in 1846 but returned after two years. In 1851, he married his childhood sweetheart Katharina Elise Heislitz.

Two years later, he took a study trip to Paris with some friends, where he met Camille Corot and Gustave Courbet. His wife died in 1856, and in 1858, he moved to Kronberg. The following year, he took a trip to Antwerp and Amsterdam, where he was heavily influenced by the Old Masters. On his return, he married Anna Johanna Auguste Küster, the daughter of Kronberg's most prominent doctor. She died in 1876.

In 1861, he and Jakob Fürchtegott Dielmann (an old friend from his days at the Städelschule) founded the Kronberg Artists' Colony, where he remained until his death. He was highly regarded and came to be known as the "King of Kronberg". In 1882 he married again, this time to a former student, Pauline Fresenius, who was slightly more than thirty years his junior. He was appointed a Royal Prussian Professor in 1894.

He was a prolific and versatile painter, producing works across numerous genres. His paintings enjoyed considerable commercial success, to the extent that owning a "Burger" in the Kronberg region came to be regarded as a mark of cultural taste.
