= Jindřich Zdík =

Catholic bishop of Olomouc

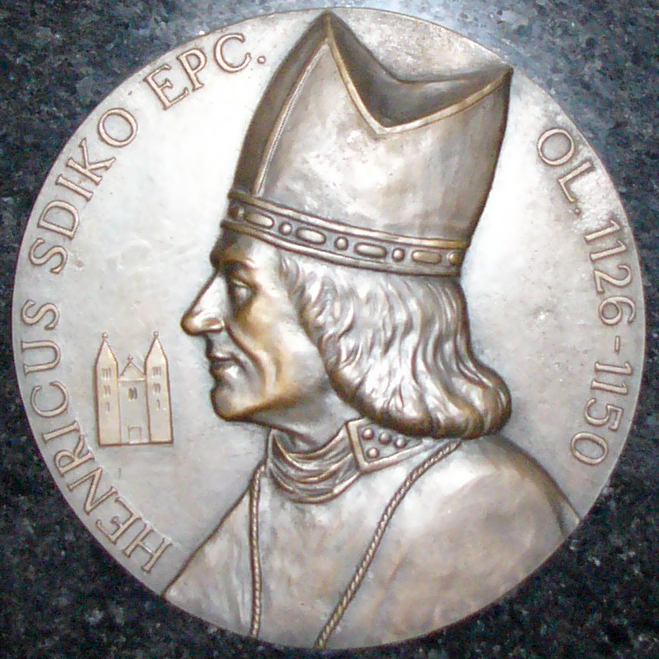
Detail of memorial plaque dedicated to Jindřich Zdík in Saint Wenceslas Cathedral in Olomouc, Czech Republic

Jindřich Zdík (also anglicized as Henry Zdík; c. 1083 – 1150 in Prague) was a Czech bishop and diplomat. He served as bishop of Olomouc from 1126 to 1150. He was a promoter of church reforms and is considered one of the most educated Czechs of his time.

== Biography ==
Jindřich Zdík was born in c. 1083. He was probably the son of the chronicler Cosmas of Prague. He went on a pilgrimage to the Holy Land in 1137–1138. While he was there, Rorgo Fretellus of Nazareth dedicated to him his Description of the Holy Places.

A deed of Jindřich Zdík from 1141 (originally erroneously dated to 1131), in which he transfers his seat to the newly built Saint Wenceslas Cathedral and lists the estates of the Roman Catholic Church in Moravia, is an important and valuable historical document, which is for many Moravian villages and towns the first written mention of the settlement.

In 1141, with papal authorization, Zdík undertook a mission against the Prussians, leading directly to his involvement with the Wendish Crusade of 1147.

After 1141, Zdík has built the Bishop Zdík's Palace in Olomouc. Today it is the only preserved Romanesque building in the city.

After returning from his pilgrimage he had the idea of founding a monastery of regular canons in Prague, which would materialize as Strahov Monastery. Zdík had the support of the bishops of Prague, the Duke of Bohemia Soběslav I, and — after his death — Vladislav II. After Zdík's first unsuccessful attempt to found a Czech variant of the canons' order at the place called Strahov in 1140, an invitation was issued to the Premonstratensians, whose first representatives arrived from Steinfeld in the Rhine valley (Germany).

Hildebert and Everwin, two medieval manuscript illuminators, worked in the scriptorium under Bishop Zdík. The famous Horologium Olomucense was created in their scriptorium for the bishop.
