= Hildebert, Count of Ivois =

9th-century Count of Ivois

Hildebert (fl. 882), was Count of Ivois, the successor to his father Bérenger I. Almost nothing is known about Hildebert other than a donation in his father's name to Saint-Vanne Abbey in Verdun in 882. The necrology of Verdun Cathedral records the death of Hildebertus comes [Count Hildebert] which is the only historical record of his being a count.

In other texts his name is mentioned as Hildo of Ivois (In Latin: Hildonis/Hildus).
