= Hildebert and Everwin =

Bohemian manuscript illustrators of the 12th century

Hildebert cursing a mouse, Everwin (Everwinvs) writing.

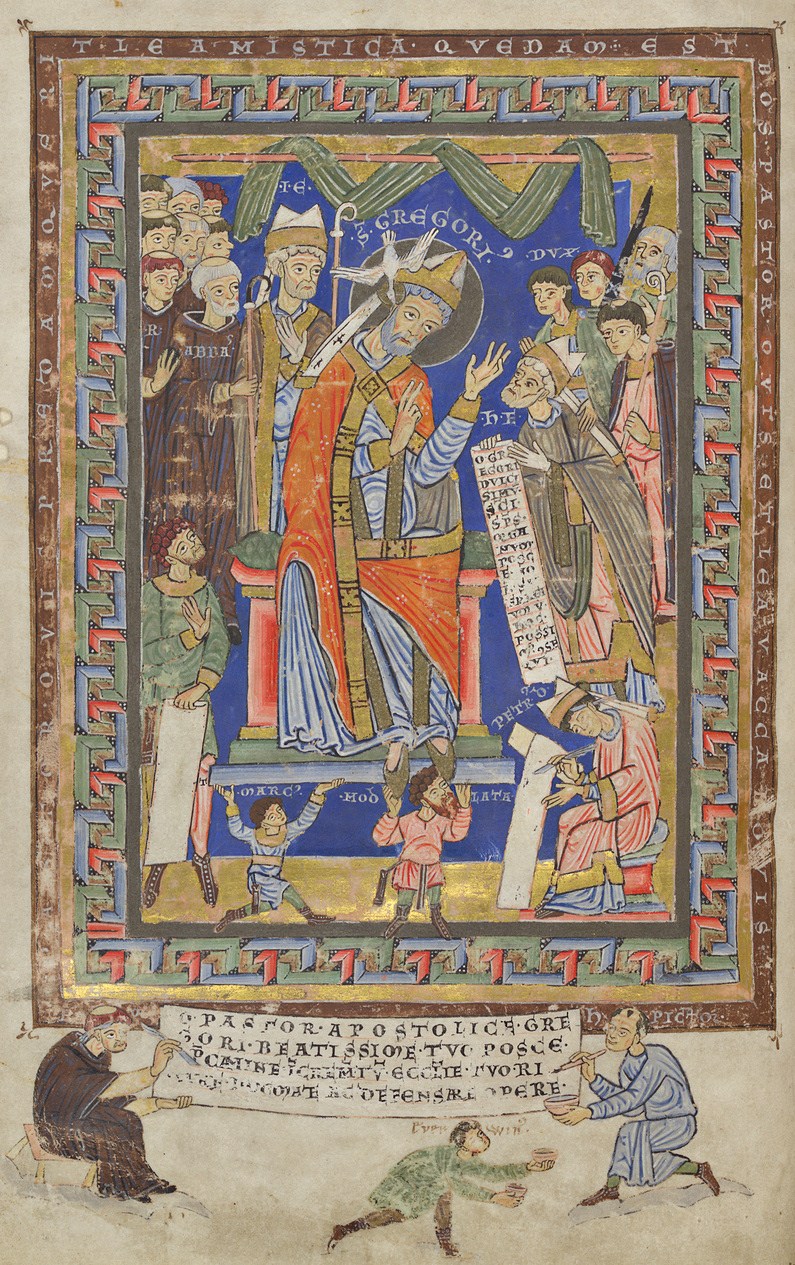
From left: monk R., Everwin and Hildebert (h. pictor), depicted at the bottom of a scene from the Olomouc Collectarium.

Hildebert and Everwin were two lay medieval artists. They are the first artists known by name who were active in the area covered by today's Czech Republic. They worked as illuminators in the scriptorium of Bishop Jindřich Zdík in the first half of the 12th century. The scriptorium, which was at that time the most important illuminators' workshop in Moravia, was located in Olomouc. Hildebert and Everwin depicted themselves in two illuminated manuscripts of around 1140. They took part in creating the Olomouc Collectarium (known also as the Olomouc Horologium or Horologium Olomucense). They also participated in illuminating the manuscript De Civitate Dei, written by Augustine of Hippo. It is now in the Prague Metropolitan Chapter Library (codex A 21/1, fol. 153r). It is thought that Hildebert was the master illuminator, while Everwin was an assistant or apprentice.

They are probably best known from an image that appears at the end of the manuscript of De Civitate Dei. Hildebert is depicted sitting, dressed in layman's clothes. Everwin is sitting below him, drawing an ornament on a sheet of parchment. Hildebert's clenched fist is raised and his gaze is directed to a nearby table (which is called Mensa Hildeberti, or Hildebert's table). On the table, a mouse is eating a piece of bread. An open book on Hildebert's writing desk shows a Latin inscription which reads: "Pessime mus, saepius me provocas ad iram. Ut te deus perdat" ("Most wicked mouse, you incite me to anger once too often. May God destroy you.") It is possible that the complaint was intended as a criticism of the poor working conditions of some medieval artists.

== Olomouc Collectarium ==
The manuscript of the Olomouc Collectarium is the most significant work created in Zdík's scriptorium. It has its origin in the 1130s–1140s and contains 446 illuminations. The most renowned scene from the manuscript depicts Pope Gregory the Great, who is surrounded by two groups of noblemen, clerics and Benedictine monks. Hildebert, Everwin and the monk R. (apparently the scribe of the manuscript) are depicted at the bottom of the scene. During the Thirty Years' War, the manuscript was taken to Sweden as war loot, and is now in the National Library of Sweden (codex A 144). In 2009, it was lent for research purposes to the Czech Republic.
