= Hugh of Burgundy =

Hugh of Burgundy may refer to:

- Six different dukes of Burgundy:
  - Hugh the Black (died 952)
  - Hugh I, Duke of Burgundy (died 1093)
  - Hugh II, Duke of Burgundy (died 1143)
  - Hugh III, Duke of Burgundy (died 1192)
  - Hugh IV, Duke of Burgundy (died 1271)
  - Hugh V, Duke of Burgundy (died 1315)
- One count of Burgundy:
  - Hugh, Count of Burgundy (died 1266)
- Hugh of Burgundy (bishop of Lausanne)
- Hugh of Burgundy (archbishop of Besançon)
