= Conradines =

Franconian aristocratic dynasty (9th century - 1012)

- Country: East Francia, Kingdom of Germany
- Founded: 9th century - Gebhard, Count of the Lahngau
- Titles: King of Germany; Duke of Franconia; Duke of Lotharingia; Duke of Swabia
- Dissolution: 1012; 1014 years ago - Herman III, Duke of Swabia died without issue
- Cadet branches: Salian dynasty

The Conradines or Conradiner were a dynasty of Franconian counts and dukes in the 8th to 11th Century, named after Duke Conrad the Elder and his son King Conrad I of Germany.

== History ==
The family is first mentioned in 832, with Count Gebhard in the lower Lahn region. His sons are mentioned in 861 as propinqui (close relatives) of Adalard the Seneschal, who had served Louis the Pious. But the clan's rise to prominence began with Oda, wife of Emperor Arnulf of Carinthia, who was a member of the family. In view of his family relationship with Oda, Conrad the Elder was frequently referred to as nepos (nephew, grandson, descendant) of the Emperor. He and his brothers apparently were in fact Arnulf's closest relatives, and he relied heavily on their support in his feud with the counts of Babenberg. Arnulf rewarded them by helping them gain territories, beyond their original realm in Hesse, in Thuringia and the Frankish regions along the Main river.

After Arnulf's death, the Conradines were the only blood relatives of the new king, Louis the Child, and thus the dominant family in the kingdom. Conrad's brother Gebhard became duke of Lorraine in 903. In 906, Conrad the Elder and his son Conrad the Younger decisively defeated the rival counts of Babenberg in the battle of Fritzlar, thereby attaining supremacy in Franconia. Conrad the Elder died in the battle, but his son became duke of Franconia.

Five years later, after the death of the last Carolingian wearing the crown of East Francia in 911, Conrad was elected king as Conrad I -- instead of the West Francian (and Carolingian) king Charles the Simple, thus ending Carolingian rule in East Francia.

Conrad I had no children. Having largely failed to secure unity and order in the Empire in the face of obstinate resistance from the dukes of Swabia, Bavaria and Lorraine, Conrad, on his deathbed in December 918, persuaded his brother Eberhard, margrave and subsequently duke of Franconia, to forgo any aspiration for the crown for himself and to recommend to the Frankish nobles the election of the powerful duke of Saxony, Henry the Fowler (Henry I), as next king in order to ensure unity among the German tribes and preserve the Empire. Eberhard honored this request, and Henry was duly elected at the Reichstag of Fritzlar in 919.

With this, the Conradines reverted to the status of local princes. Conrad's brother Eberhard, the new duke of Franconia, remained loyal to the new (Saxon) king Henry and for a while (926-928) even held the troubled duchy of Lorraine in order to restore order. However, when Henry's son Otto the Great became king and emperor, Eberhard unwisely joined Arnulf of Bavaria and Thankmar, Henry's son from his first marriage, in a rebellion which ended in defeat and Eberhard's death at the battle of Andernach in 939 and the family's loss of the Franconian duchy.

In 982 the family temporarily regained the duchy of Swabia, which they had inherited in 926 but then lost again, but they held it only until 1012. In 1036, the last Conradine count died and the family (in the male line) became extinct.

== Genealogy ==
=== Elder line ===
Gebhard, Count of the Lahngau (d. 879)

1. Udo, Count in the Lahngau
  1. Conrad, Duke of Thuringia (d. 906)
    1. Conrad I of Germany (d. 918), Duke of Franconia from 906, first German king from 911
    2. Eberhard (c. 885 – 939), Duke of Franconia from 918
    3. Otto (d. after 918), Count in the Ruhrgau
  2. Eberhard (d. about 903), Count in the Niederlahngau
    1. Conrad Kurzbold (d. 948), Count in the Niederlahngau
    2. Gebhard (d. after 947), Count in the Ufgau
    3. Eberhard (d. 944), Count in the Bonngau
    4. a daughter, married Werner, Count in the Nahegau, progenitor of the Salian dynasty
  3. Gebhard, Duke of Lorraine (d. 910)
    1. Herman I, Duke of Swabia (d. 949)
    2. Odo (d. 949), Count in the Wetterau, married Cunigunda, daughter of Herbert I, Count of Vermandois
      1. Heribert, Count in the Wetterau (925–992)
        1. Ermentrude (972–1015), married Count Frederick of Luxembourg
        2. Otto of Hammerstein (975–1036), Count of Zutphen, married Ermengarde, daughter of Godfrey I, Count of Verdun
  4. Rudolph (d. 908), Bishop of Würzburg
2. Waldo, Abbot of St. Maximin's at Trier 868/879
3. Bertulf, Archbishop of Trier from 869 until 883
4. Berengar (d. after 879), Count in the Hessengau
  1. Oda, wife of Arnulf of Carinthia

=== Younger line ===
Conrad I, Duke of Swabia (d. 997), also Kuno of Öhningen, descent uncertain, probably a grandson of Count Gebhard in the Ufgau; married Richlint, a scion of the royal Ottonian dynasty

1. Herman II, Duke of Swabia (d. 1003), married Gerberga, daughter of King Conrad of Burgundy
  1. Matilda (988–1032), married Conrad I, Duke of Carinthia, secondly Frederick II, Duke of Upper Lorraine
  2. Gisela (989–1043), married Brun I, Count of Brunswick, secondly Ernest I, Duke of Swabia, thirdly Conrad II, Holy Roman Emperor
  3. Beatrix (d. after 1025), married Adalbero, Duke of Carinthia
  4. Hermann III, Duke of Swabia (d. 1012)
2. a daughter (?), married Grand Prince Vladimir I of Kiev

== Sources ==
- Reuter, Timothy (trans.) The Annals of Fulda. (Manchester Medieval series, Ninth-Century Histories, Volume II.) Manchester: Manchester University Press, 1992.
