= Berengar I of Neustria =

9th-century Frankish noble

Berengar I was a 9th-century nobleman of East Francia, a son of Gebhard, Count of Lahngau, and younger brother of Udo. He and his brother were created margraves of Neustria by Charles the Bald in 861.

He was possibly a Conradine, a relative for sure of Adalard the Seneschal, a Girardid. Berengar was probably the namesake of Berengar II of Neustria, who was probably the son of Berengar I's successor, Henry of Franconia. He is believed to be the same person as Count Berengar I of Ivois.

With his brothers, Udo and Waldo the Abbot, he took part in the 861 revolt of Carloman of Bavaria, possible his cousin-in-law, against Louis the German. The revolt was crushed and the three brothers fled with their relative Adalard to the court of the West Frankish king, Charles the Bald, who granted them wardship of the march against the Vikings while the march against the Bretons was granted to Robert the Strong.

Charles' patronage of the family provoked the jealousy of the Rorgonids, the most powerful family local to Neustria and then controlling the ducatus Cenomannicus (Maine). In 865, they allied with Saloman of Brittany and attacked the brothers. Charles, to attain peace, took the march back and gave it to Gauzfrid, a Rorgonid.

A charter of 879 mentions Berengar and his brothers taking part in the foundation of the college of Gemünden. Evidently, the death of Louis the German in 876 had allowed them to return to the court of Carloman.

His daughter Ota became wife of Arnulf of Carinthia.

== Sources ==
- Guillotel, Hubert. "Une autre marche de Neustrie." in Christian Settipani and Katharine S. B. Keats-Rohan, Onomastique et Parenté dans l'Occident médiéval. 2000.
