= Gebhard, Count of the Lahngau =

Gebhard (died 879) was a mid-9th-century count in the Lahngau and the first documented ancestor of the dynasty later known as the Conradines. He was a "leading man of the [East] Franks" and a brother-in-law of Ernest, margrave of the Bavarian Nordgau. Gebhard may be a son of Odo I, Count of Orléans, if identical with Udo the Elder, count in the Lahngau from 821 to 826.

In 838, he allied with Poppo of Grapfeld and Otgar, Archbishop of Mainz, against the rebellious Louis the German and in favour of the emperor Louis the Pious.

He was the father of

- Udo, count in the Lahngau
- Waldo, abbot of St. Maximin's Abbey at Trier
- Bertulf, Bishop of Trier
- Berengar, count in the Hessengau

who all rose to prominent positions in West Francia.

== Sources ==
- The Annals of Fulda. (Manchester Medieval series, Ninth-Century Histories, Volume II.) Reuter, Timothy (trans.) Manchester: Manchester University Press, 1992.
