= Ota (wife of Arnulf of Carinthia) =

Queen of the East Franks from 888 to 899

Queen consort of the East Franks
- Tenure: 22 February 896 – 8 December 899
- Born: c. 874; Velden, East Francia, Carolingian Empire
- Died: between 899 and 903
- Burial: Saint Emmeram's Abbey
- Spouse: Arnulf of Carinthia
- Issue: Louis the Child
- House: Conradines
- Father: Berengar I of Neustria

Ota (German: [ˈoːta]; c. 874 – between 899 and 903 AD; also Oda, Uota, Uta) was Queen consort of the East Franks by marriage to Arnulf of Carinthia. She was the mother of Louis the Child. By birth she was probably a member of the Conradine Dynasty.

== Life ==
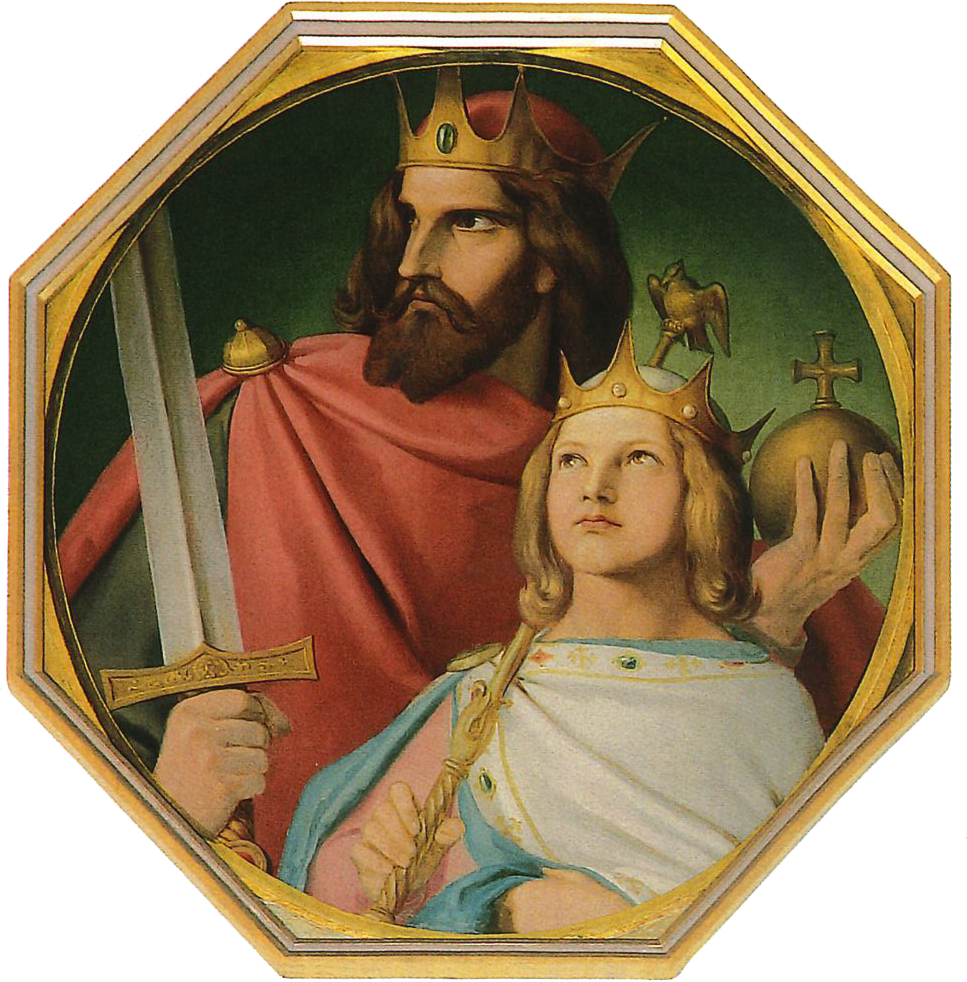
19th-century portrait by Johann Jakob Jung of Ota's husband Arnulf and their son Louis.

=== Possible Conradine ancestry ===
Very little is known of Ota. She was probably born in Velden in 873/4. She is often thought to have been the daughter of Berengar, Count of Hesse and thus a member of the Conradine Dynasty. This view has been questioned by Donald Jackman, who has found no evidence that Ota was a member of the Conradines.

=== Marriage to Arnulf of Carinthia ===
In 888, aged about fourteen, Ota married Arnulf of Carinthia, who was king of East Francia. There is no evidence that Ota was crowned. If Ota was a Conradine, then the marriage was intended to win Arnulf support in Bavaria and Lorraine.

For the first few years of their marriage, the couple had no children together. Arnulf thus asked at an imperial assembly held at Forcheim that his two illegitimate sons, Zwentibold and Ratold, born to different mothers, should be recognised as his heirs. Yet in 893 Ota gave birth to Arnulf's legitimate heir, Louis the Child. She was not, as is sometimes conjectured, the mother of Glismut, the wife of Conrad the Elder: Glismut was the mother of Conrad I of Germany, who was born c. 890.

Ota's name features in her husband's documents at the beginning and towards the end of his reign, when she intervened in privileges for the abbey of Kremsmünster and the monastery of Altötting, and for the Bishopric of Worms and the Bishopric of Freising.

=== Accusation of adultery ===
The most notable incident involving Ota occurred in June 899. According to the Annals of Fulda, she was accused of adultery: "Then a scandal, and worse, a crime, unheard of for many years, was published about Queen Ota; that she had yielded her body to a lustful and wicked union". Ota was called to defend herself at an assembly in Regensburg. The accusation of adultery against a queen was not as "unheard of" as the Annals of Fulda suggest however: Richardis, wife of Charles the Fat, was accused of adultery just twelve years earlier. Ota (like Richardis before her) protested her innocence, and "cleared herself of the accusation [...] with the help of seventy-two oath-helpers before the judgement of the leading men who were present". Arnulf was already ill when this accusation was made. In fact, it may be that the accusation of adultery was made because Arnulf was ill.

=== Decline and death ===
Arnulf died in late 899. Ota's son, Louis (aged six), became king after his father's death, but Ota was not involved in his regency. Louis was placed in the guardianship of Hatto I, Archbishop of Mainz, Bishop Adalbero of Augsburg, and several major nobles. Ota disappears from history; she is spoken of as dead by 903, and is believed to have withdrawn to the lands of her family. She bequeathed her property to the church.

Ota was buried in St. Emmeram's Abbey in Regensburg.

== Notes ==
Preceded by Richardis	Queen of Eastern Francia; 888–899	Succeeded by Cunigunde of Swabia
Preceded by Ageltrude	Empress of the Holy Roman Empire; 896–899	Succeeded by Anna of Constantinople
Preceded by Ageltrude	Queen consort of Italy; 894–899	Succeeded by Anna of Constantinople
