= Udo of Neustria =

9th century Frankish nobleman

Udo was a 9th-century nobleman of East Francia, a son of Gebhard, Count of Lahngau, and older brother of Berengar I of Neustria. He and his brother were afforded their position in the March of Neustria both by kinship to Adalard the Seneschal and the favour of Charles the Bald.

With his brothers, Berengar and Waldo, Abbot of St Maximin's Abbey, Trier, he took part in the 861 revolt of Carloman of Bavaria, possibly his cousin-in-law, against Louis the German. The revolt was crushed, and the three brothers fled with their relative Adalard to the court of the West Frankish king, Charles the Bald, who granted them wardship of the march held against the Vikings while the march against the Bretons was granted to Robert the Strong.

Charles' patronage of the family provoked the jealousy of the Rorgonids, the most powerful family local to Neustria, which controlled the ducatus Cenomannicus (Maine). In 865, they allied with Saloman of Brittany and attacked the brothers. Charles, to attain peace, took the march back and gave it to Gauzfrid of Neustria, a Rorgonid.

A charter of 879 mentions Udo and his brothers taking part in the foundation of the college of Gemünden. Evidently, the death of Louis the German in 876 had allowed them to return to the court of Carloman.

Udo left a son, Conrad, Duke of Thuringia, who was the founder of the Conradine dynasty and father of Conrad I of Germany. One younger son, Rudolf, became Bishop of Würzburg, and another, Gebhard, became Duke of Lotharingia.

== Sources ==
- Guillotel, Hubert. "Une autre marche de Neustrie." in Christian Settipani and Katharine S. B. Keats-Rohan, Onomastique et Parenté dans l'Occident médiéval. 2000.
