= Louis the Child =

Final Carolingian-dynasty King of East Francia (reigned 899 to 911)

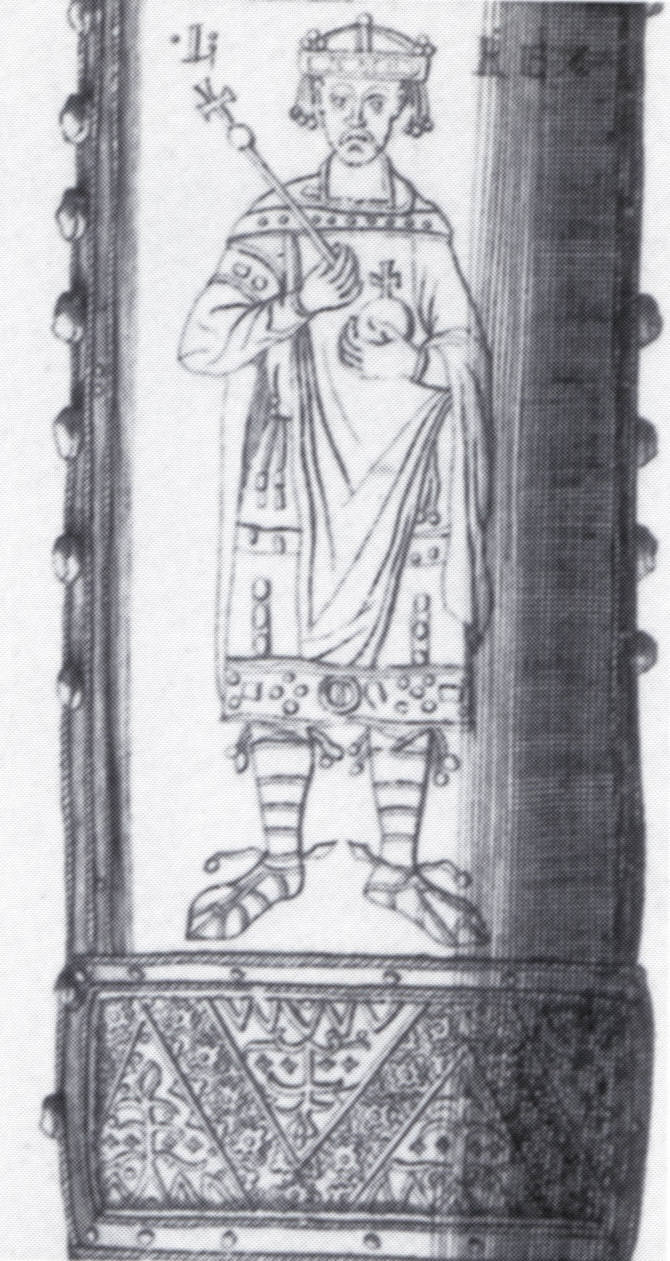
- Louis the Child as he appears on the Imperial Sword.

King of East Francia
- Reign: 899 – 20/24 September 911
- Coronation: 4 February 900, Forchheim
- Predecessor: Arnulf of Carinthia
- Successor: Conrad I

King of Lotharingia
- Reign: 900 – 20/24 September 911
- Predecessor: Zwentibold
- Successor: Charles III of France
- Born: September/October 893; Ötting (Autingas), Bavaria
- Died: 20/24 September 911 (aged 17 or 18) possibly Frankfurt
- Burial: Saint Emmeram's Abbey, Regensburg
- Spouse: unknown
- House: Carolingian dynasty
- Father: Arnulf of Carinthia
- Mother: Ota

Louis the Child (German: Ludwig das Kind; 893 – 20/24 September 911), sometimes called Louis III or Louis IV, was the king of East Francia from 899 until his death and was also recognized as king of Lotharingia after 900. He was the last East Frankish ruler of the Carolingian dynasty. He succeeded his father, Arnulf, in East Francia and his elder illegitimate half-brother Zwentibold in Lotharingia.

Louis became king when he was six and reigned until his death aged 17 or 18. During his reign, the country was ravaged by Magyar raids.

== Life ==
Louis was born in September or October 893 in Altötting, Duchy of Bavaria. He was the only legitimate son of king Arnulf of Carinthia and his wife, Ota, a member of the Conradine dynasty. He had at least two brothers: his elder, illegitimate brother Zwentibold, who ruled Lotharingia, and another brother named Ratold, who briefly ruled the Kingdom of Italy.

=== East Francia ===
Louis was crowned in Forchheim on 4 February 900. This is the earliest East Frankish royal coronation about which records are known to exist. Louis was of a weak personal constitution, often sick, and due to his young age, the reins of government were entirely in the hands of others – the nobles and bishops. Indeed, the coronation was probably a result of the fact that there was little Louis could gain at the expense of the nobles.

The most influential of Louis's councillors were Hatto I and Solomon III (bishop of Constance). It was these two who assured that the royal court decided in favour of the Conradines against the Babenbergers in the matter of the Duchy of Franconia. They appointed Louis's nephew, Conrad, as a duke. In 903, the Raffelstetten customs regulations were promulgated under Louis' reign, the first customs regulations in the East Frankish part of Europe.

=== Lotharingia ===
Louis succeeded Zwentibold in 900. He maintained a separate chancery for East Francia and Lotharingia, the latter under Archbishop Radbod of Trier. He appointed an East Frank, Gebhard, as duke of Lotharingia, alienating the Lotharingian nobility. The latter did not participate in East Frankish assemblies.

=== Magyar invasions ===
In 900, during the Hungarian invasions of Europe, the Magyar army ravaged Bavaria. Another group of Magyars were defeated by Luitpold, Margrave of Bavaria and Bishop Richer of Passau. In 901, they devastated the Duchy of Carinthia. In 904 Louis invited Kurszán, the kende of the Magyars, to negotiations, but killed him and his delegation. In 906 Magyars twice ravaged the Duchy of Saxony. In 907, they inflicted a heavy defeat on the Bavarians who had invaded Hungary, killing the Margrave Luitpold and many high nobles in the Battle of Pressburg. Next year it was the turn of Saxony and Thuringia, and in 909 that of Alemannia. On their return, however, Arnulf, Duke of Bavaria inflicted a defeat on them on the river Rott, but in 910 they, in their turn, defeated Louis the Child's army in the Battle of Augsburg. Louis himself tried to take some military control as he grew older, but he had little success against the Magyars. His army was destroyed at Ennsburg in 907.

=== Death and succession ===
In a state of despair, possibly afflicted by severe depression, Louis died at Frankfurt am Main on 20 or 24 September 911, seventeen or eighteen years old. Louis was buried in the monastery of Saint Emmeram's in Regensburg, where his father Arnulf also lay. His death brought an end to the eastern branch of the Carolingian dynasty.

In 911, the dukes of East Francia elected Conrad of Franconia, son of Gebhard, as the king, while the nobles of Lotharingia elected the Carolingian Charles the Simple, already king of West Francia, as their king.

== See also ==
- Family tree of German monarchs
- List of Frankish kings

Louis IV of East Francia Carolingian dynasty Born: September/October 893 Died: 20/24 September 911
Regnal titles
Preceded by Arnulf	King of East Francia; 899–911	Succeeded by Conrad I
Preceded by Zwentibold	King of Lotharingia; 900–911	Succeeded by Charles the Simple
