= Adalard the Seneschal =

Frankish nobleman

Adalard, also known as Adalhard or Alard, and called the Seneschal, was a Frankish nobleman of the 9th century. He served as warden of the Norman march from 861 to 865, and was Lord Chancellor of France under Louis the Pious.

He was a son of Leuthard I of Paris and brother of Gerard II of Paris. Louis the Pious made him seneschal of the Carolingian Empire. On Louis' death, he joined Charles the Bald and arranged a marriage between the king and Ermentrude of Orléans, his niece by Ingeltrude of Fézansac and Odo, Count of Orléans. After the Treaty of Verdun (in 843), Adalard went to serve Louis the German in East Francia.

In 861, after the revolt of Carloman, Louis' eldest son, Adalard and his relatives Udo, Berengar, and Waldo took refuge at the court of Charles in Paris. Charles granted him the Norman March of Neustria, to defend it against the Vikings. However, he soon incited the jealousy of the Rorgonids, then the most powerful clan in Maine. Allied with Salomon, King of Brittany, they revolted against him and made war. After peace was settled, Charles transferred the March to Gosfrid, the representative of the Rorgonids.

He probably had a son Adalhard of Metz.

== Sources ==
- Riché, Pierre. Les Carolingiens, une famille qui fit l'Europe. 1983.
- Guillotel, Hubert. "Une autre marche de Neustrie." in Christian Settipani and Katharine S. B. Keats-Rohan, Onomastique et Parenté dans l'Occident médiéval. 2000.
