= Popponids =

Ruling dynasty in Franconia, Thuringia and Bavaria in the ninth century

Popponids (Elder House of Babenberg)
- Ruling dynasty in Franconia, Thuringia and Bavaria in the ninth century
- Country: Carolingian Empire, East Francia, Kingdom of Germany
- Founded: 9th century, by Poppo I of Grapfeld
- Titles: List: - Count of Grabfeld and Tullifeld (819-945); - Princeps militiae (...–886); - Duke of Franconia (Margrave of the Franks, Duke of the Austrasians) (882–892); - Margrave of Thuringia (880–892); - Duke of the Sorbian March (...–906); - Margrave of the Nordgau (903–906); - Count of the Volkfeld
- Cadet branches: Elder Babenberg, Houses of Schweinfurt, Scheyern, Wittelsbach, Younger Babenberg, Henneberg, Babonids

The Popponids were a Frankish dynasty flourising in the early 9th century that originated from Grabfeld. They are named after their descent from Poppo of Grapfeld, who in turn descended from the Robertians. The Popponids gradually evolved into the Elder (or Franconian) House of Babenberg. They were related to the Luitpoldings.

Various dynasties are thought to be descending from them, most importantly the Younger (or Austrian) House of Babenberg, who named themselves after the Elder House of Babenberg although their precise linkage cannot yet be proven. But the Wittelsbach, the Henneberg, the Schweinfurt and the Babonids are also thought to be descending from the Popponids.

== History ==
=== Popponids ===
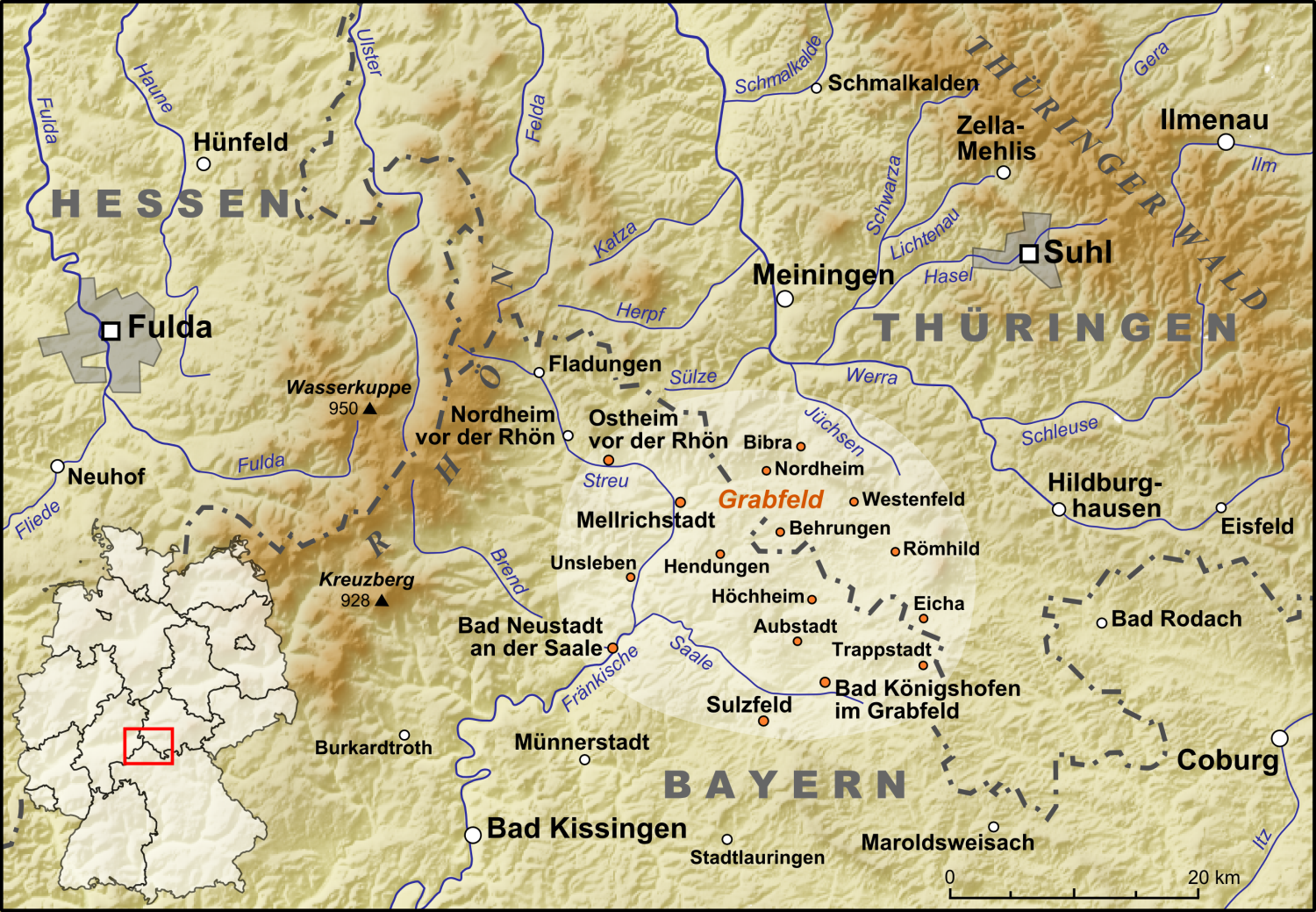
Map showing Grabfeld on an overlay of Hesse, Thuringia and Bavaria

The oldest known ancestor of the Frankish Babenbergs was Poppo I of Grapfeld (died 839/841), after whom the dynasty is named. He was the grandson of Count Heimrich of the Upper Rheingau (740–795), a son of Count Cancor (died 771). This makes Poppo part of an early collateral line of the Robertians related to the French royal family of the Capetians. Poppo was count in the Grapfeld (Grabfeld) region from 819 to 839, on the border between modern-day Bavaria and Thuringia. Poppo was married to a daughter of the Hattonid dynasty, bringing in possessions in positions in Saxony and Austrasia.

A Christian I, Hesso I and II, Burkhard and Liutolf are known to be counts in Grabfeld (and direct relatives thereof), but their affiliation to the Popponids is not proven. Christian I with his wife Heilwig is sometimes placed between Poppo (~770-839/841) and his (grand-)son Henry (~830-886) to explain a time gap between the two, but his name is not repeated in following generations.

=== Elder Babenberger ===
Poppo's (grand-)sons continued the dynasty. Instead of Popponids, they are increasingly called Babenberger onwards.

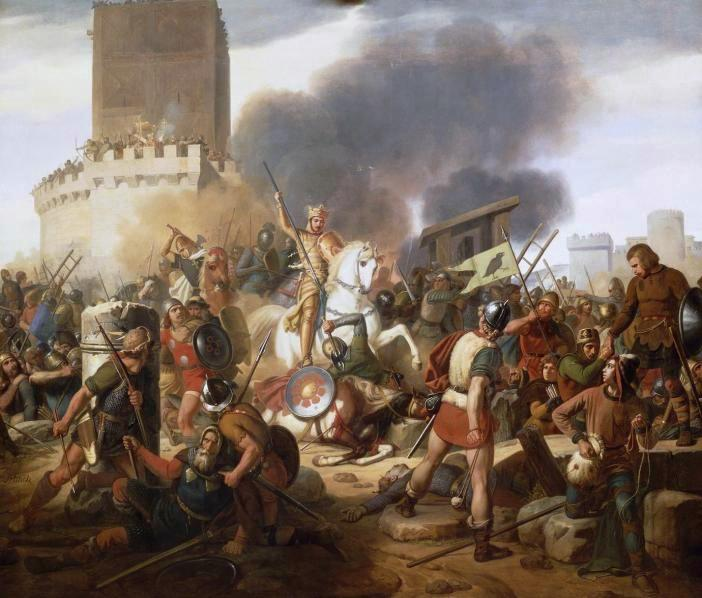
Count Odo defends Paris against the Norsemen, romantic painting by Jean-Victor Schnetz (1837)

Henry I of Franconia (died 886) is described by the Annals of Fulda as the "leader of the army" (princeps militiae) of Louis the Younger in 866 during his rebellion against his father King Louis the German. During the reign of Charles the Fat, who favored the family, Henry's career is a succession of battles with Viking raiders. He was variously called marchio francorum (Margrave of the Franks) and dux austrasiorum (Duke of the Austrasians).

He was eventually killed in battle during the Viking Siege of Paris in 886. His death may have enabled his distant cousin Count Odo to carve out an increasingly important role for his descendants, the House of Capet. Furthermore, his death and inability to protect his family may have enabled the later Babenberger Feud and the death of his children.

Henry's wife may have been Ingeltrude, the daughter of Eberhard of Friuli. They had at least three sons and one daughter, all of whom died during the Babenberger Feud;

- Henry II (died 906), killed in battle
- Adalbert (c. 854 – 906), captured and executed
- Adalhard (died 903), captured and executed
- Hathui (Hedwig, Hadewig) (died 903), married to Duke Otto I the Illustrious of Saxony, mother of King Henry the Fowler

Henry's brother, Poppo II (died aft. 906), was Margrave of Thuringia from about 880. He waged a number of wars against his younger brother, Egino. In 892, after having advised in favor of a failed expedition against the Slavs, he was deposed by Charles' successor King Arnulf of Carinthia, who put his relatives the Conradines in charge of Thuringia instead. After Arnulf's death in 899, he was restored to his lands and made Count of the Bavarian Nordgau (in 903) and of the Volkfeld (in 906).

The castle of Babenburg in Bamberg in Bavaria is first mentioned in relation to the Babenberger Feud in 902 and is likely to have been named after Poppo II (whose name is spelt in various ways, including Babo).

Their younger brother Egino feuded with his brother Poppo in Thuringia in 882 and 883, but was killed in battle with the Magyars in 886 or 888 along with Duke Burchard of Thuringia, and Bishop Rudolf I of Würzburg.

=== Babenberger Feud ===
The Babenberger Feud would have already started as early as 892, when Arnulf appointed his Conradine relatives and dismissed Poppo as margrave of Thuringia. It continued after Arnulf's death and his succession by six-years' old Louis IV the Child in 899. To add to the confusion, from 900 onwards, the Magyar ravaged Europe and particularly Bavaria and Carinthia. When the Franconian Babenberger incorporated small parts of the diocese of Würzburg into their domain in 902, the conflict between the Conradine and Babenberger factions eventually led to a full clash. The Castle of Babenburg was besieged by the Conradines (on this occasion we find the first mentioning of the castle), and Adalhard was captured after losing his left eye and was subsequently beheaded by Gebhard at the Reichstag of Forchheim.

Both sides clashed again during the battle of Fritzlar on 27 February 906, where the Conradines won a decisive victory, although their leader Conrad the Elder fell. On the Babenberger side, Henry II was killed in the battle.

The sole survivor of the three Babenberg brothers, Adalbert, was summoned before the royal court by the Regent, Archbishop Hatto I of Mainz, a partisan of the Conradines. He refused to appear, held his own against the king's forces for some time in his castle at Theres, but surrendered in 906. In spite of a promise of safe-conduct by Hatto, he was condemned and beheaded. Conrad the Younger now became the undisputed Duke of Franconia and later, after the early death of Louis the Child, King of the East Frankish Kingdom in 911.

Adalbert's son, Henry III of Babenberg, survived the feud. He may have been married to a sister of Margrave Luitpold and fathered Berthold of Schweinfurt, Archbishop Henry of Trier, Bishop Poppo I of Würzburg and an unknown brother or Margrave Leopold I directly.

Berthold was the progenitor of the House of Schweinfurt [de]. The Schweinfurter are likely to have been the ancestors of the Counts of Scheyern and hence of the House of Wittelsbach.

In addition, Berthold is known to either have been the brother or the uncle of first Younger Babenberger ruler, Margrave Leopold I, meaning that either Leopold directly or an unknown person would have been a further son of Henry III. The names of Leopold's children, namely Henry, Judith, Adalbert and Poppo are strongly suggestive of a link with Henry III, while the names of his other child Ernest as well as his own name Leopold point to a link to the Luitpoldings (possibly in reference to Henry II's Luitpolding wife). Leopold's descendants, the Younger or Austrian House of Babenberg would govern the March of Austria from 976 until 1246.

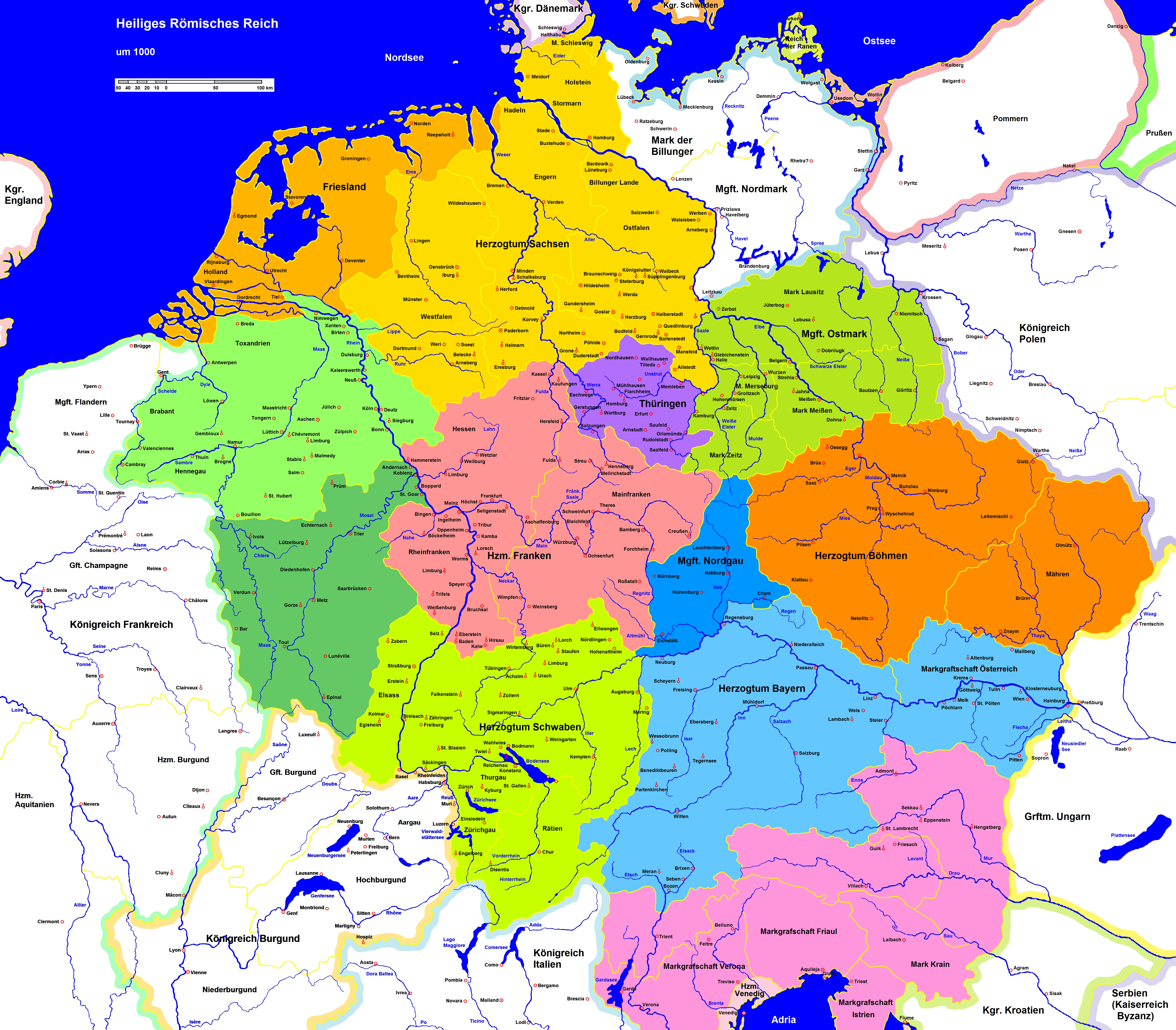
The Holy Roman Empire around 1000

Finally, Count Babo I of Regensburg and his descendants, the Babonids, known to be of Babenberger descent, were an influential family of Bavarian nobility that administered possessions in the Bavarian Donaugau and Nordgau from the 10th to the 12th century. Count Babo's origins are unclear, but he could have been another son or grandson of Henry III, or alternatively could have descended from Poppo II.

=== Other branches ===
During and after the events surrounding the Babenberger Feud, Henri I's Babenberger descendants lost most of their possessions and offices in Franconia and almost disappeared from history. But meanwhile, Poppo II, as uncle of his killed nephews Adalbert, Adalhard, and Henry II, seems to have remained in the royal favor, and was even named count of the Nordgau in 903 as well as count of the Volkfeld in 906. He probably died around 906, after which his rule over the Nordgau was taken over by the Luitpolding Duke Arnulf of Bavaria.

Poppo II's descendants (including a number of further Poppo's) founded the County of Henneberg and gradually evolved into the House of Henneberg, around the castles of Struphe and Henneberg. The diocese of Bamberg was founded in 1007 on the land of the former Babenberg heartland.

== Genealogy ==
=== Genealogical table ===
Cancor (died 771), of Robertian ancestry, Count of Hesbaye, co-founder of Lorsch Abbey

⚭ Angila

1. Heimrich (Heimerich, Heimo), (ca. 740 – 795), 764 co-founder of Lorsch Abbey, about 771/785 Count in the Wetterau, 772/782 Count in the Upper Rheingau, 777 Count in the Saalgau, 778 Count in the Lahngau, 784 lay abbot of Mosbach Abbey, 795 killed in the battle of Lüne and the Elbe fighting the Obotrite Slavs ⚭ Eggiwiz
  1. Bubo (Ruadbert, Robert) (died ca. 805), 780/781 Count
    1. Cancor, 812 Count
    2. Bubo (Ruadbert, Robert), 817 Count in the Saalgau, Oberrheingau and Wormsgau
  2. Heinrich (Heimerich) (765 – 812), 750/802 Count in the Saalgau ⚭ Hadaburg
    1. Poppo I (died 839/841), 819 Count in the Saalgau, 819 Count in the Grapfeld ⚭ N.N. from the Hattonid dynasty
      1. Son (possibly Christian I)
        1. Henry I (died 886), 866 princeps militiae, Margrave (marchio) of the Franks, Dux Austrasiorum, 28 August 886 dies before Paris, buried in St. Médard's Abbey in Soissons ⚭ Ingeltrud, a daughter of Eberhard von Friaul, an Unruoching
          1. Adalbert (died 906), 888 Count, 9 June 906 executed
          2. Adalhard (died 903), 888 Count, 902 executed
          3. Henry II (died 906), 888 Count
            1. Henry III (died 935), either a son of Adalbert, Adalhard or Heinrichs, 912/934 Count
              1. Henry I (died 964 in Rome), 956 Archbishop of Trier
              2. Poppo I (died 961), 931–940 royal chancellor, 941 Bishop of Würzburg
              3. Berthold (died 980), 941 Count, 960 Count in the Radenzgau, 961 Count of the Lower Naab, 973 Count in the Volkfeld, 976 Margrave, 980 Count in eastern Franconia ⚭ 942/943 Eiliswintha (Eila) (died 1015), daughter of Count Lothar II of Walbeck, founder of Benediktinerklosters Schweinfurt [de]
                - → House of Schweinfurt [de]
                  - → House of Scheyern
                    - → House of Wittelsbach
              4. (?) N.N.
                1. Leopold I (~950-994), 976 Margrave of Austria, 994 died after a tournament ⚭ Richeza of Saulafeldgau (~950-994)
                  - → Younger House of Babenberg
              5. (?) N.N.
                1. (?) Babo I, Burgrave of Regensburg, possibly a son of Poppo IV instead (see below)
          4. Hedwig (Hadui, Haduich) (died 903) ⚭ about 869/870 Otto the Illustrious, Duke of Saxony (died 912), a Liudolfinger
        2. Poppo II (died ~906), 878/880 attested, Margrave (marchio), dux, 892 Margrave of the Sorbian March, 903 Margrave in the bavarian Nordgau, 906 Count in the Volkfeld
          1. Adalbert (died aft. 906), 898 Count in the Grabfeld
          2. Poppo III (died 945), Count in the Grabfeld and Tullifeld
            1. Poppo IV, 951/956 Count ⚭ Willibirg of Ebersberg [de]
              1. (?) Babo I, Burgrave of Regensburg, possibly a grandson of Henry II instead (see above)
            2. Otto I (died 982), 951/955 Count
              1. Otto II (died 1008), 999 Count
                1. Poppo V (died 1014/18) 1006 Abbott of Lorsch und Fulda
                2. Otto III (died 1049), 1031 Count
                  1. Poppo I (died 1078), 1037/1049/1057 Count of Henneberg, 1078 slain in the Battle of Mellrichstadt ⚭ Hildegard of Thuringia, daughter of the landgrave Louis VII the Bearded, married in second marriage with Thimo von Nordeck (a Ludowinger)
                  2. Godebold I (died after 1100), 1057 Burgrave of Würzburg
                    1. Godebold II (died 1144), Burgrave of Würzburg
                      1. Poppo II (died 1155/1156), Count of Henneberg, 1132 Vogt of Lorsch Abbey ⚭ Irmgard of Stade, a daughter of Count Lothar Udo, Margrave of the Northern March (Udonen)
                      2. Gebhard (died 1159), 1122/27 Elect, 1150 Bishop of Würzburg
                      3. Günther (died 1161), 1146 Bishop of Speyer
                      4. Otto (died 1200), 1190 Bishop of Speyer
                      5. Berthold (died 1157), Burgrave of Würzburg
                        - → House of Henneberg
                3. Gerberga ⚭ Heinrich of Schweinfurt (died 1017), Count in the bavarian Nordgau, son of Berthold (see above)
          3. Adela of the Sorbian March ⚭ Count William I of Weimar
            - → House of Weimar-Orlamünde
        3. Egino (886/888), 883 Co-duke of the Thuringii, 886/888 killed in battle with the Magyars
    2. Ratolf (died after 838), Count
      1. Hraban

=== Schematic family tree ===
A schematic tree of the most important Popponids and their branches is shown below. This reconstruction is uncertain and based on Roskilde Historie.

Since the concept of heraldry did not exist yet, coat of arms in this tree are purely fictional. Crowns are likewise fuctional. Nonetheless, a silver eagle on an azure field has been attributed to the earliest Babenberger and has been depicted here (Gustav Seyler, 1909), and seems to recur in cadet branches (namely the early coat of arms of the counts of Henneberg, the counts of Schweinfurt, and the Younger Babenberger).

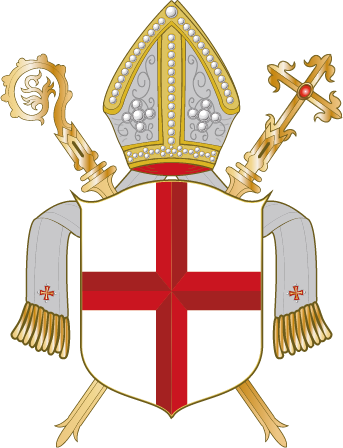
Henry ⚭ Hadaburg of Burgundy
Poppo I of Grapfeld ⚭ N.N. (Hattonid) | Ratolf ⚭ N.N.
(?); Christian I of Grapfeld ⚭ Heilwig | Hraban
Henry I died 886 ⚭ Ingeltrude of Friuli | Poppo II died ~906 ⚭ N.N. | Egino died ~887
Henry II died 902 ⚭ N.N. | Adalbert died 906 | Adalhard died 903 | Hedwig died 903 ⚭ Otto I of Saxony | Poppo III died 945 | Adelbert died aft. 915 | Adela of the Sorbenmark ⚭ William I of Weimar
Henry III died 935 ⚭ N.N. Luitpolding | Ottonians (Liudolfings) | Poppo IV ⚭ Willibirg of Ebersberg | Otto I ⚭ N.N.
Archbishop; Henry I of Trier died 964 | Bishop; Poppo I of Würzburg died 961 | Berthold of Schweinfurt died 980 ⚭ Eilika of Walbeck | N.N. ⚭ N.N. | Babo I of Regensburg died 1001/1002 ⚭ 1. Ida of Swabia ⚭ 3. Matilda of the Schweinachgau | Counts of Henneberg (Note: Around 1235, Poppo VII of Henneberg changed his arms from a Or, a black double-headed eagle to the more familiar arms with the hen on the mountains (Hen + Berg). In this overview, the eagles are added in the intermediate stage to show a continuity between the Babenberg eagle and the Henneberg eagle, see: Gustav A. Seyler (1909), Wappen der deutschen Souveraine und Lände, pp. 124 and Gustav A. Seyler (1970), Geschichte der Heraldik : Wappenwesen, Wappenkunst, Wappenwissenschaft, pp. 237)
Counts of Schweinfurt | Leopold I (~950-994) ⚭ Richeza of Saulafeldgau (~950-994) | Babonids | Counts of Henneberg
Counts of Scheyern | Margraves of Babenberg
House of Wittelsbach | Dukes of Babenberg

| Emperor |
| King |
| Duke |
| Landgrave / Margrave / Count Palatinate |
| Count |
