= 908 =

Calendar year

908 in various calendars
- Gregorian calendar: 908; CMVIII
- Ab urbe condita: 1661
- Armenian calendar: 357; ԹՎ ՅԾԷ
- Assyrian calendar: 5658
- Balinese saka calendar: 829–830
- Bengali calendar: 314–315
- Berber calendar: 1858
- Buddhist calendar: 1452
- Burmese calendar: 270
- Byzantine calendar: 6416–6417
- Chinese calendar: 丁卯年 (Fire Rabbit); 3605 or 3398 — to — 戊辰年 (Earth Dragon); 3606 or 3399
- Coptic calendar: 624–625
- Discordian calendar: 2074
- Ethiopian calendar: 900–901
- Hebrew calendar: 4668–4669
- Hindu calendars
- Vikram Samvat: 964–965
- Shaka Samvat: 829–830
- Kali Yuga: 4008–4009
- Holocene calendar: 10908
- Iranian calendar: 286–287
- Islamic calendar: 295–296
- Japanese calendar: Engi 8 (延喜８年)
- Javanese calendar: 807–808
- Julian calendar: 908; CMVIII
- Korean calendar: 3241
- Minguo calendar: 1004 before ROC 民前1004年
- Nanakshahi calendar: −560
- Seleucid era: 1219/1220 AG
- Thai solar calendar: 1450–1451
- Tibetan calendar: མེ་མོ་ཡོས་ལོ་ (female Fire-Hare); 1034 or 653 or −119 — to — ས་ཕོ་འབྲུག་ལོ་ (male Earth-Dragon); 1035 or 654 or −118

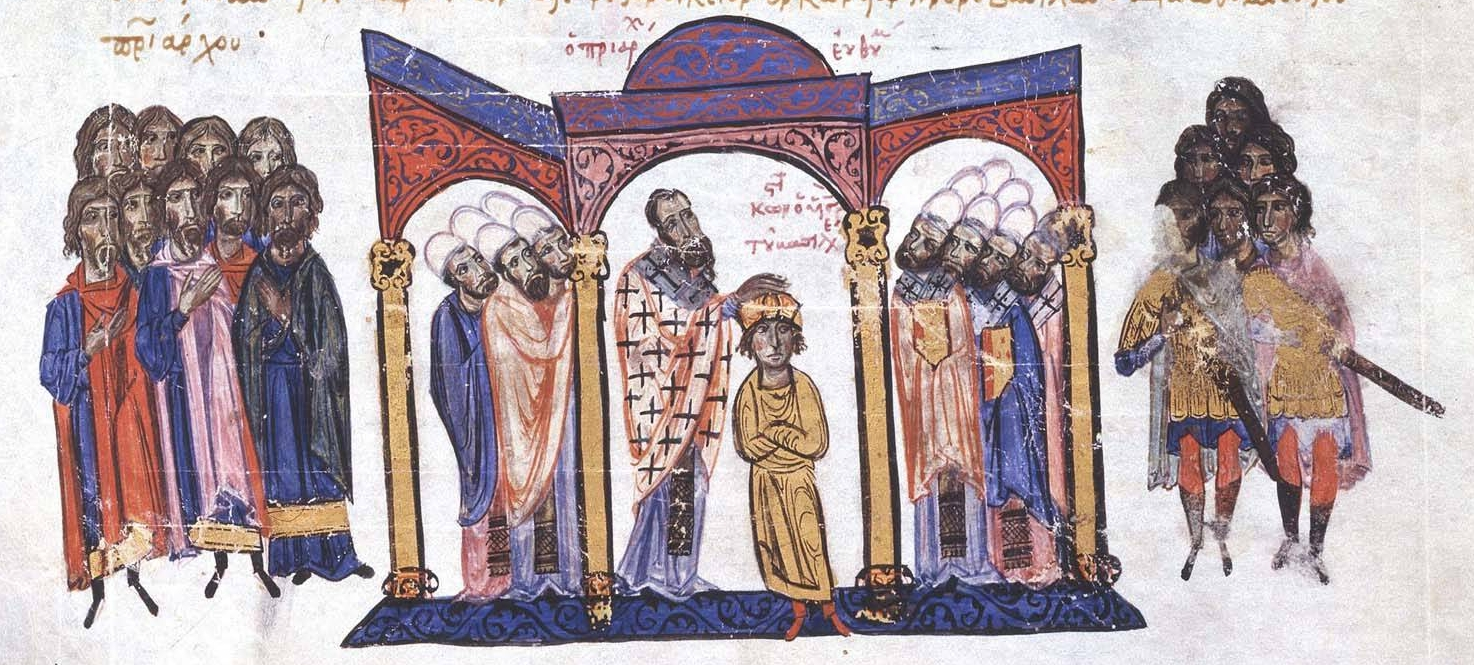
Constantine VII is crowned as co-emperor.

Year 908 (CMVIII) was a leap year starting on Friday of the Julian calendar.

== Events ==
=== By place ===
==== Byzantine Empire ====
- May 15 – The three-year-old Constantine VII, the son of Emperor Leo VI (the Wise), is crowned as co-emperor of the Byzantine Empire by Patriarch Euthymius I at Constantinople. The ceremony is held in the Hagia Sophia. After the rituals, Constantine is crowned (symbolically) and becomes Leo's successor.

==== Europe ====
- August 3 – Battle of Eisenach: An invading Hungarian force defeats the East Frankish army under Duke Burchard, killing him, together with Duke Egino and Rudolf I, bishop of Würzburg. The Hungarians devastate Thuringia and Saxony as far north as Bremen, returning home with many spoils.
- Duke Atenulf I (the Great) of Benevento attacks the Saracens at the Garigliano River, with the assistance of Naples and Amalfi. Crossing the river, Atenulf defeats an Arab army and reaches the walls of their fortified camp. However, the sudden withdrawal of the Neapolitans renders the siege useless.

==== Ireland ====
- September 13 – Battle of Belach Mugna: In an alliance with the kings Cerball mac Muirecáin of Leinster, Cathal mac Conchobair of Connacht, and Cellach mac Cerbaill of Osraige, High King Flann Sinna defeats the forces of King Cormac mac Cuilennáin of Munster near Castledermot (County Kildare).

==== Arabian Empire ====
- August 13 – Abbasid caliph al-Muktafi died and he was succeeded by his nominated heir, his younger brother Jafar (Al-Muqtadir).

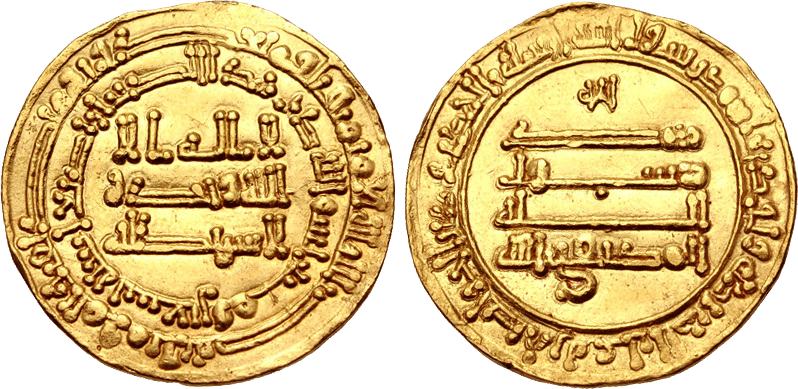
Gold dinar of Al-Muqtafi, Abbasid caliph

- December 17 – Husayn ibn Hamdan leads a revolt to depose the newly-appointed Abbasid Caliph Al-Muqtadir in Baghdad. He installs his uncle Abdallah ibn al-Mu'tazz and kills vizier Al-Abbas ibn al-Hasan al-Jarjara'i, but fails to murder Al-Muqtadir. This leads, finally, to the coup's collapse.
- Winter – Snow falls in Baghdad. According to Arabic writings, even rivers are frozen.

==== China ====
- March 26 – Emperor Taizu (Zhu Wen) of Later Liang has the 15-year-old Li Zhu, the last Tang Dynasty emperor, poisoned. Li Zhu receives the posthumous name of Ai ("lamentable").
- May 1 – Emperor Wang Jian of Former Shu puts his adoptive son (and a potential successor) Wang Zongji (Prince of Shu) to death. He orders Wang Zongji's associates to be exiled.
- June 9 – The generals Zhang Hao and Xu Wen assassinate Yang Wo (Prince of Hongnong). He is succeeded by his 11-year-old brother Yang Longyan as ruler of the Wu Kingdom.
- June 18 – Xu Wen murders Zhang Hao and takes over as Yang Longyan's regent, and sole commander of the imperial guard. He becomes de facto ruler of the Wu Kingdom.

== Births ==
- Al-Muttaqi, Abbasid caliph (d. 968)
- Guo Chong, Chinese general (approximate date)
- Ibrahim ibn Sinan, Abbasid mathematician (d. 946)
- Kiyohara no Motosuke, Japanese nobleman (d. 990)
- Thankmar, Frankish prince (approximate date)

== Deaths ==
- February 23 – Li Keyong, Shatuo governor (b. 856)
- March 25 – Li Kening, Chinese general
- March 26 – Ai, emperor of the Tang Dynasty (b. 892)
- April 25 – Zhang Wenwei, Chinese chancellor
- May 1 – Wang Zongji, Chinese prince and pretender
- June 9 – Yang Wo, emperor of Wu (b. 886)
- June 18 – Zhang Hao, Chinese general
- August 3
  - Burchard, duke of Thuringia
  - Egino, duke of Thuringia
  - Rudolf I, bishop of Würzburg
- August 13 – Al-Muktafi, Abbasid caliph
- September 13 – Cormac mac Cuilennáin, king of Munster (Ireland)
- December 17
  - Al-Abbas ibn al-Hasan al-Jarjara'i, Abbasid vizier
  - Abdallah ibn al-Mu'tazz, Abbasid poet (b. 861)
- Blaise of Amorion, Byzantine monk and missionary
- Cléirchén mac Murchadh, king of Maigh Seóla (Ireland)
- Denewulf, bishop of Winchester
- Li Sijian, Chinese warlord and governor
- Remigius of Auxerre, Frankish scholar
- Wang Shifan, Chinese warlord (b. 874)
- Xuefeng Yicun, Chinese Chan master (b. 822)
