= Battle of Lechfeld (910) =

Battle during the Hungarian invasions of Europe

First Battle of Lechfeld
- Part of the Hungarian invasions of Europe
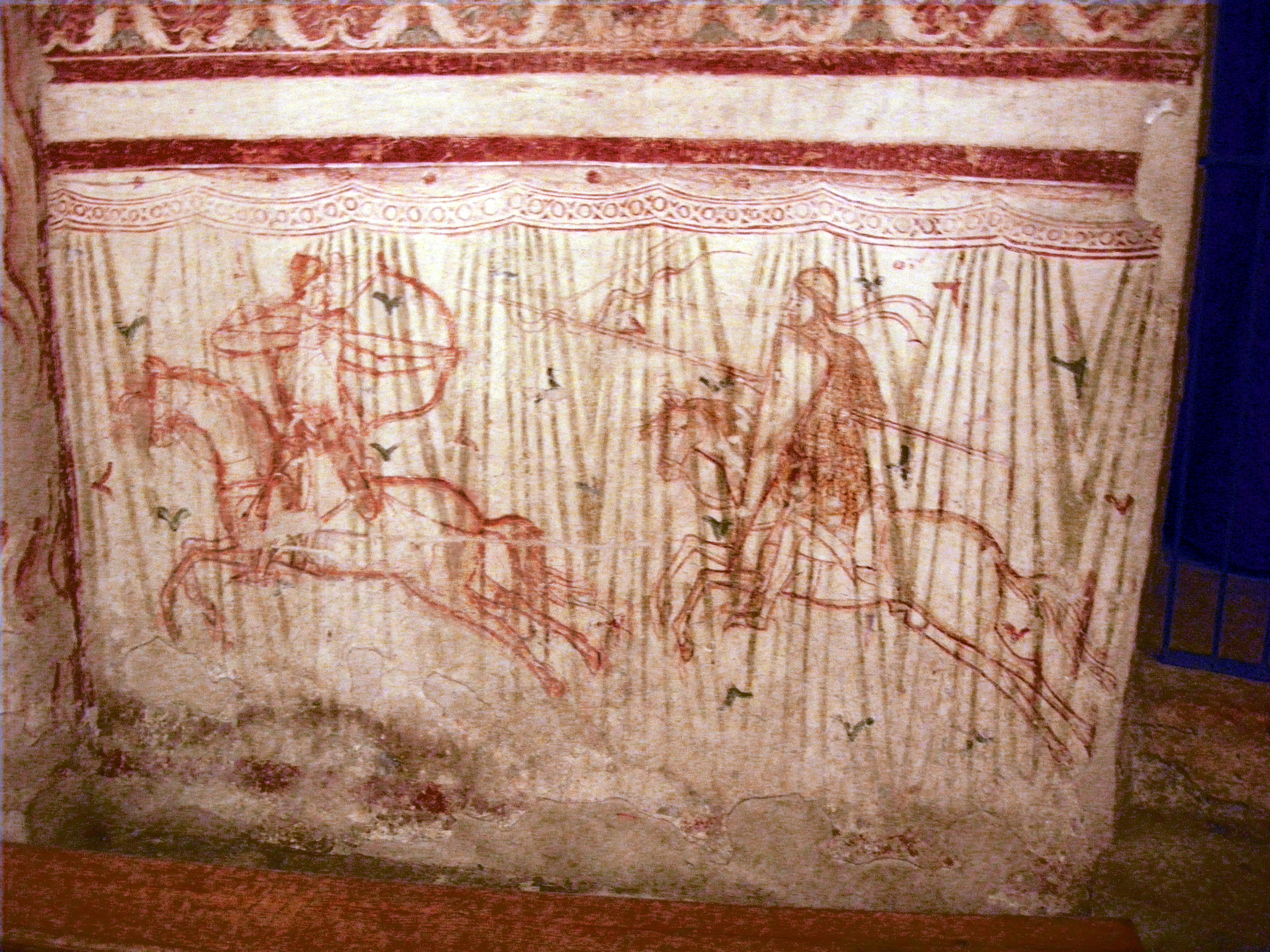
Date	12 June 910
Location	Lechfeld plain, near Augsburg, Bavaria
Result	Hungarian victory

Belligerents
East Francia, Swabia	Principality of Hungary

Commanders and leaders
Louis the Child (nominal commander); Count Gozbert of Alamannia (de facto commander) †; Managolt, count of Alemannia †	Unknown Hungarian commander

Strength
Unknown	5,000–7,000

Casualties and losses
Heavy, among them Gozbert and Managolt	Light

The first Battle of Lechfeld (the first Battle of Augsburg in Hungarian historiography), fought on 12 June 910, was an important victory by a Hungarian army over the combined forces of East Francia and Swabia (Alamannia) under the nominal command of Louis the Child. Located approximately 25 km (15.53 mi) south of Augsburg, the Lechfeld is the floodplain that lies along the river Lech. At this time the Grand Prince of the Hungarians was Zoltán, but there is no record of him taking part in the battle. After the battle, the victorious Hungarians broke into Franconia for the first time. On 22 June in Franconia, the same Hungarian army defeated a united army of the duchies of Franconia, Lotharingia and Bavaria in the Battle of Rednitz. The Bavarian, Frankish, Swabian and Saxonian duchies became taxpayers of the Hungarians. As consequence of this victory, in the next year, Hungarian attacks launched from the Carpathian Basin crossed the Rhine for the first time in 911.

The battle is an example of successful use of the feigned retreat and Parthian shot tactics, usually carried out by nomadic warriors, and highlighting the effective use of psychological warfare.

== Sources ==
Sources include Antapodosis, seu rerum per Europam gestarum, written by Liutprand of Cremona, Continuator Reginonis, Annales Alamannici, and the necrologies of the Swabian counts Gozbert and Managolt, who were killed in this battle. The chronicle Annalium Boiorum VII, written in the 16th century by the Bavarian humanist Johannes Aventinus, gives a detailed narration of the battle, relying on older documents which today are lost. However, he errs in dating this battle to 907, soon after the Battle of Pressburg, mistakenly locates it at Ennsburg in Bavaria, and instead of Swabians, names the Bavarians as participants.

== Location and date ==
The majority of historians accept the date and place of the battle given by Liutprand as 910 and Augsburg, respectively. Although the Antapodosis was written in the 950s, only a few decades after the battle, the Hungarian historian Torma Béla believes that Aventinus, who wrote in the 16th century, was correct when he placed the battle in 907 and at Ennsburg, not Augsburg. However, this represents a dissenting opinion from other historians, who believe that the near-contemporary Liutprand's information is more accurate.

== Background ==
This battle was part of the war in the Carpathian Basin between the newly-settled Hungarians and the kingdom of East Francia, which lasted from the Hungarian conquest of Transdanubia from the Bavarians in 900, until the Battle of Rednitz in 910. After the Battle of Pressburg in 907, the Hungarians continued their campaigns against East Francia. In 908 a Hungarian army invaded Thuringia and were victorious at Eisenach, killing the co-dukes Burchard and Egino, as well as Rudolf I, Bishop of Würzburg. In 909 a Hungarian army invaded Bavaria, but it was defeated by Arnulf, Duke of Bavaria in a minor battle near Pocking.

== Prelude ==
Possibly desirous of repeating the victorious campaigns of his ancestor Charles the Great against the Avars which ended with the subjugation of the latter (though unmindful of the fate of Luitpold in the Battle of Pressburg three years earlier), King Louis decided that forces from all the German duchies should come together to fight the Hungarians. He even threatened with execution those who would not gather under his flag. So we can presume that Louis gathered a "huge army," as Liutprand terms it in his Antapodosis. The exact size of the Frankish army is not known, but it can be assumed that it was far more numerous than the Hungarian army. This explains why the Magyars were so cautious during the battle, and waited an unusually long time (more than twelve hours), sapping the strength of the enemy little by little with hit-and-run tactics as well as using psychological methods to confuse them, before taking the decisive tactical step.

The historian Igaz Levente states that the Hungarian campaign of 910 was started in order to prevent another German campaign against the Hungarian territories like the one from 907, which ended in disaster for the Western army in the battle of Pressburg. Although it was a crushing Hungarian victory, the Magyars thought that it is safer to conduct military operations in Germany rather than in their own lands. This Hungarian campaign is often cited as a brilliant example of the preventive war strategy.

The king and his troops arrived near the city of Augsburg, on the plains of Gunzenle, near the Lech river, and waited for the Frankish army led by Gebhard, Duke of Lorraine to appear and join them against the Hungarians. The king's army was led by Count Gozbert, because Louis was only 16 years old at the time. We do not know who led the Hungarians, inasmuch as the Grand Prince of the Hungarians in the ninth and tenth centuries never took part in a battle outside of the Hungarian territories, the campaigns being led by more minor military leaders—possibly the gyula, the horka or one of the princes.

The Hungarians learned about the plans of Louis, and quickly sent an army to prevent the joining of the Swabian and Frankish-Lotharingian-Bavarian forces. From the work of Aventinus: Annalium Boiorum volume VII, we can reconstruct their route: After they had crossed Bavaria via the River Enns, they reached Augsburg through Tegernsee, then Sandau near to Landsberg am Lech. They reached Augsburg through forced march very quickly, totally unexpected by his army. This is further proof of the incredible efficiency of espionage due to its emphasis by the Principality of Hungary and other states of the nomadic warriors. The unexpected appearance of the Hungarians before the battle of Augsburg makes it hard to believe that it was only a coincidence. This shows that Hungarian intelligence worked very effectively not only within Hungary, but also in enemy territory, making possible the rapid movement of military operations onto the opponent's land. As Liutprand of Cremona mentions, the king did not expect that the Hungarians would appear in his territory so quickly. So his plans of uniting all of his forces: his mostly Swabian troops and the Frankish-Lotharingian-Bavarian army, before the battle, failed because of the remarkable espionage of the nomadic Hungarian state and the superior mobility of the Magyar army, which made possible for them to defeat these two armies separately. In conclusion we can say that the Hungarian spies learned of the preparations of the Frankish armies and informed the Magyar commanders so quickly, that these had the time to gather an army and move into the German territory so quickly that the Eastern Franks had no time not only to reach Hungary, but even to finish the concentration of their troops, and start to move towards it. Still, from the account of Liutprand of Cremona it can be understood that, even without the Frankish help, the king's army had many more soldiers than the Hungarians.

One historian supposes that a small Hungarian unit kept the Frankish army busy until the Battle of Augsburg ended. Hungarian nomadic warriors used similar tactics elsewhere. They distracted enemies with simple maneuvers to hide the real tactical movement and intent. An example is the Battle of the Brenta.

== Battle ==
On the dawn of 12 June 910, the Hungarian horsemen made a surprise attack, shooting arrows from a distance on the king's camp. The attack managed to catch a number of Germans off guard, killing some of them in their sleep. However, the Hungarians aimed only to disrupt and harass the German troops in a swarming attack, in order to diminish the fighting spirit of the Germans, after which they retreated back to their camp.

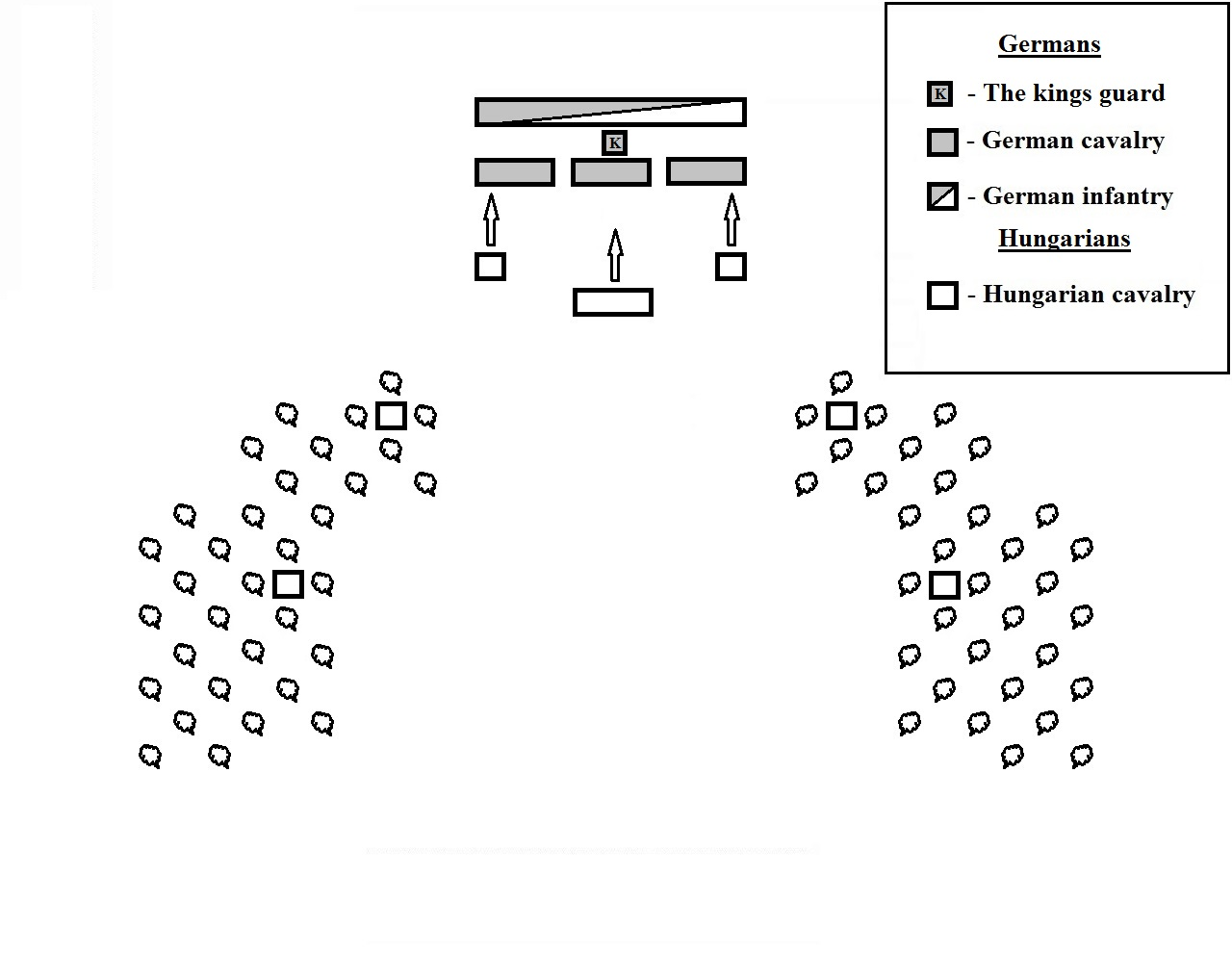
The first phase of the battle

In response, the Germans prepared for battle, forming up into their battle formations, and the first phase of the battle began, with the Hungarians, likely in small swarming archer groups, skirmishing on horseback, shooting arrows at the Germans, who protected themselves with their wall of shields. After a while, the Hungarians retreated, feigning defeat, and when the German heavy mounted horsemen pursued them, they fired arrows at the pursuing German cavalry, killing many of them, while their horses continued to retreat. In the course of the day, this tactic was used several times. Sources suggest that the German army was likely composed of infantry and heavy cavalry, with heavy shields, lances, and swords, while the Hungarians were all light cavalry, with bow and arrow as their main weapon. This could explain why when the Germans attacked, only the heavy cavalry pursued the Hungarians, while the infantry maintained a solid wall, and stayed in their places. Due to their light weapons and armor, the Hungarian troops were more mobile and quick, but this also made them more vulnerable to the Germans' heavy weapons. Nevertheless, their nomadic composite bows were superior to the European bows the Germans had, and were able to out-range the Germans and strike at them from beyond their archers' range. Additionally, the Hungarian horses were quicker than the German ones, since they had less weight to carry. However, this was not without risk to the Hungarian forces. In order to lure the German soldiers after them, the Hungarians had to move very close, and even resort to short hand-to-hand skirmishes with the better-equipped Germans along the weak points of their defensive line. Then, they would begin to retreat as the tide turned against them, feigning weakness, goading the German forces to exploit their weaknesses and sally from their defensive position. With these tactics, the Hungarians managed to disrupt the German battle formation, inflicting heavy losses on them as the battle progressed.

At 7pm in the evening, more than 12 hours from the start of the battle (at dawn), Louis the Child believed that his troops were about to win the battle. At this moment, the Hungarians started a general attack, then again used the famous feigned retreat tactic of the nomadic warriors, starting to retreat in haste, as if they were defeated. Sources vary on the reason why the Germans took the bait, but one explanation is that at this point the Germans were confident that they had won the battle, and ordered a general advance to capitalize on the Hungarian retreat. Regardless of the reason, in doing so, the Germans left their well-protected defensive lines, and broke their battle formation in their rush to catch up to the Hungarians, who retreated in good order, taking care not to disorganize their battle order.

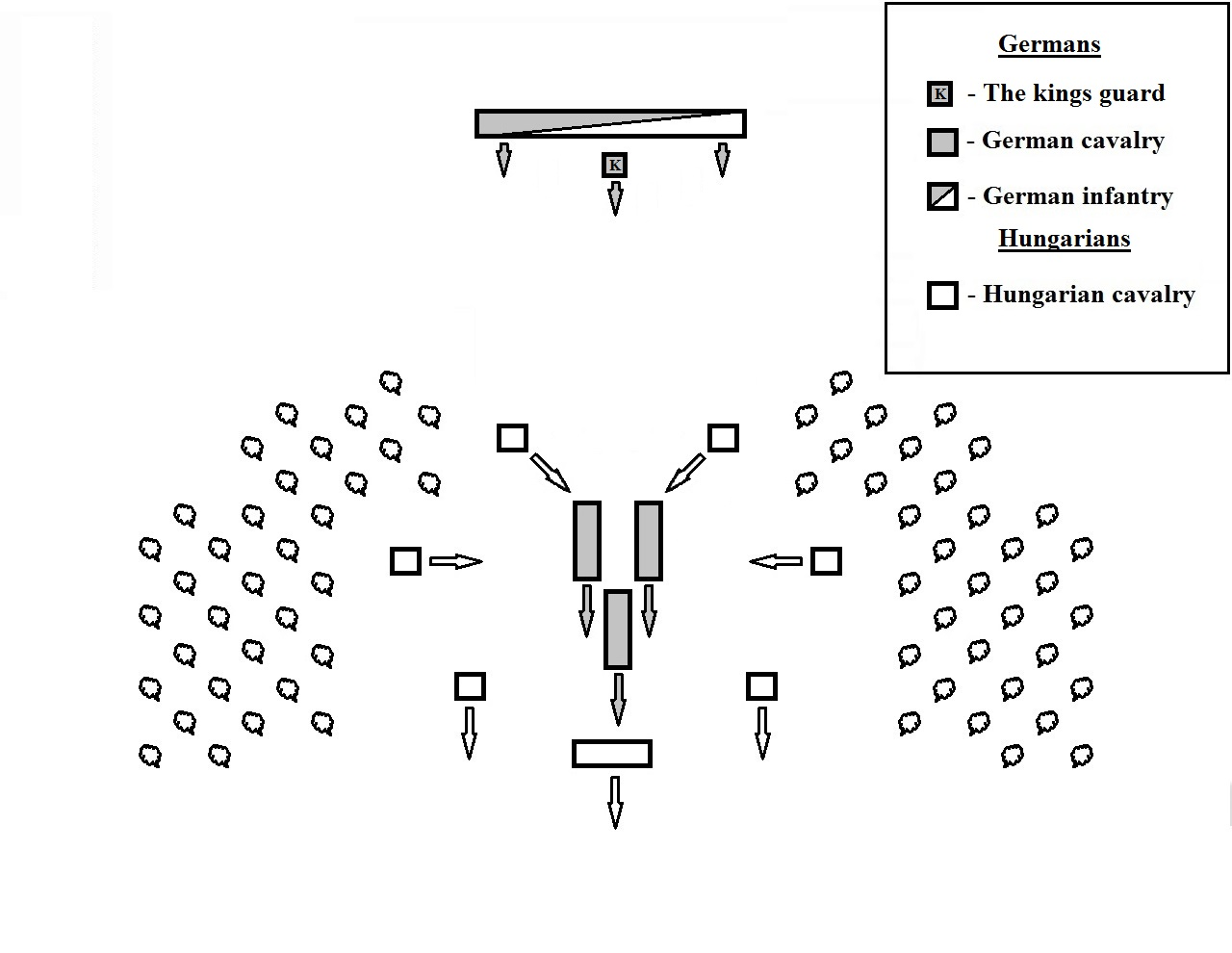
The second phase of the battle

Maybe they did not want to wait for another night, thinking that the Hungarians will shoot arrows on them all the night, destroying their camp, or they were tired by the unusual length of the battle (it lasted all day, from dawn to evening), in the hot summer sun, or they were traumatised by the ever-growing losses inflicted on them by the Hungarian arrows, or on the contrary the Hungarians, with their monotone, apparently unsuccessful attacks against their lines aroused in them a self-conceit that they are about to win the battle. Nevertheless, this shows that the Hungarians used again psychological warfare tactics, making the enemy troops to be frightened, or to lose their will to fight, or to be exaggeratedly self-conceited, which made them easier to defeat. The Hungarians also used psychological warfare in another battle that occurred 11 years earlier: the Battle of Brenta River, feigning defeat in an early skirmish, then running away, showing to the enemy commanders that they had despaired, then sending envoys to them asking for forgiveness, with this convincing the enemy to feel pretentious and comfortable, then striking in an unexpected moment and destroying the Italian army.

During the whole battle of Augsburg, the Hungarians waited for this moment, hiding their reserve troops in woods that allowed huge numbers of soldiers to be concealed. The retreating main Hungarian army lured the attacking German cavalry to the places in which their reserve troops were hidden, and they continued to retreat until the whole pursuing German cavalry crossed the narrow field which separated two woods in which the Hungarian reserves were hidden, when suddenly without observing them, these hidden Hungarian reserves came out from their hiding places and attacked the Germans with loud screaming in order to frighten and demoralize them before the final clash.

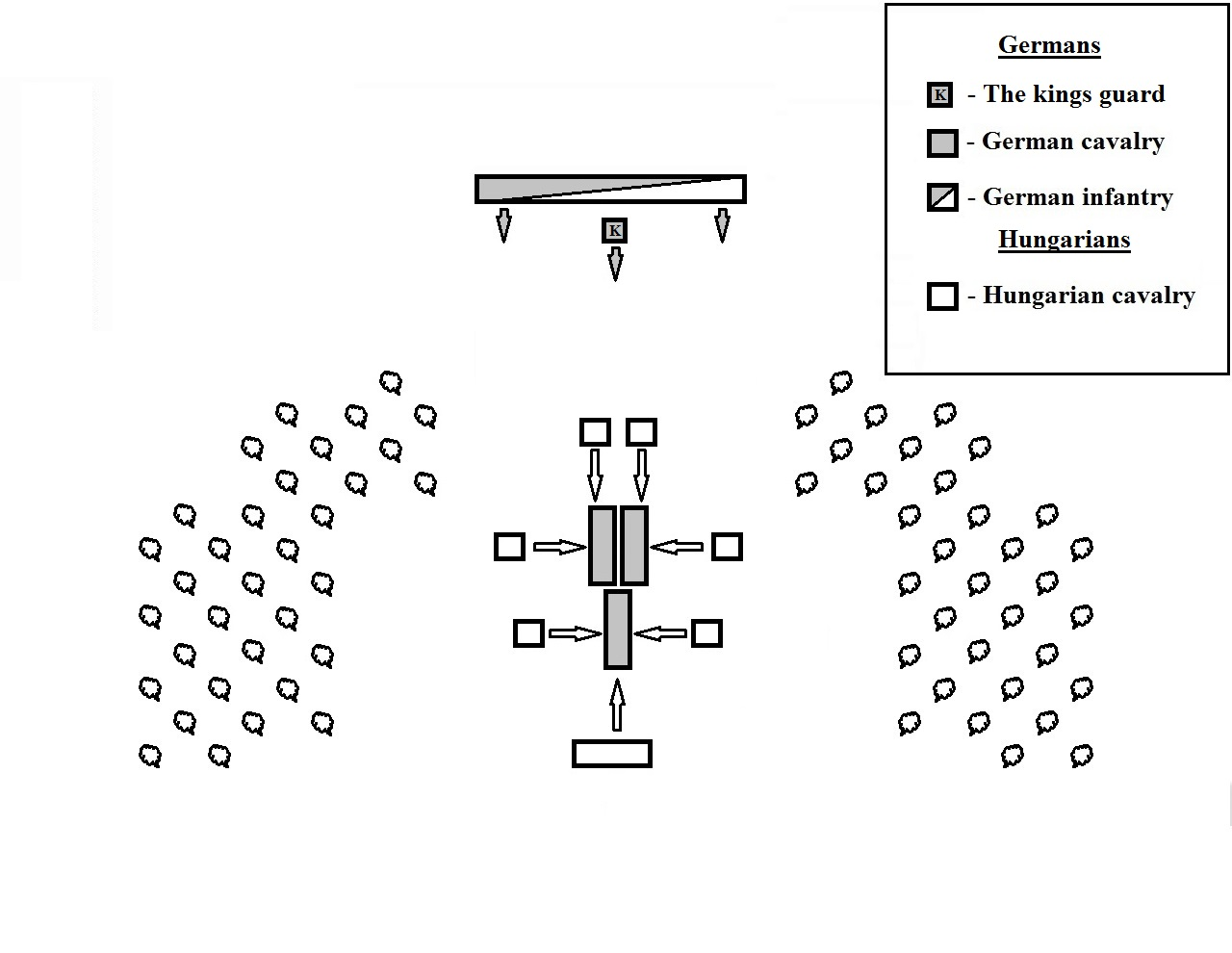
The third phase of the battle

In this moment, the retreating Hungarian main troops turned back and attacked the Germans from the front, resisting their charge, and not letting them break their line. At that moment those Hungarian units who came from the rear and sides of the Swabians surrounded them completely, and entered into a final hand-to-hand fight with the hopeless enemy. This shows that before the battle, the Hungarian commander chose carefully a place near the initial battlefield, with two woods near to each other, in which he could hide some of his troops, which waited until the pursuing Germans passed them, and then attacked them. One of the key elements of nomadic warfare was the careful choosing of the battlefield, which provide them advantage in winning the battle. For nomads, one of the important elements in a battlefield were the places where they could hide some of their troops, and to lure the enemy there in order to encircle and destroy it. In the battle in point, the German camp and its surroundings were not adequate for hiding troops without being observed by the Swabians, so the Hungarian commander chose an adequate place away from the battlefield (the first battlefield), where he could hide some of his units (this being the second battlefield), and his main purpose during the battle was to lure the enemy to that place, which he succeeded after manoeuvres which lasted from the dawn until the evening, finally ending with success. This shows the great patience of the Hungarian commander, who in the whole day conducted manoeuvres which diverted the enemy's attention from his real purpose. The same thing happened also during the events which led to the Battle of the Brenta (899), this time against the Italians, a battle in which probably the Hungarians were led by the same commander.

The fact that the Hungarian troops which performed the tactic of the feigned retreat, luring the German cavalry at the second battlefield, could withstand, in the decisive moment, the charge of the Swabian heavy cavalry, shows that the Hungarians had also troops with adequate armor and weapons to resist a charge from the most formidable heavy cavalry of those times. Their success was also facilitated by the fact that they retreated in order, when the Swabians lost theirs. This shows also that the Hungarian commander chose attentively which branches to use in the precise moments of the battle, and that he was totally at charge of his troops from the beginning until the end of the battle.

From Liutprand's account ("the kings people") we can understand that the king was not among the pursuing German cavalry, so this is why he escaped. In this slaughter, because they could not break the Hungarian encirclement, probably no German cavalrymen survived, and presumably here was killed count Gozbert, the real commander of the army and Managolt, the count of Alemannia, who were leading the attack of the German cavalry.

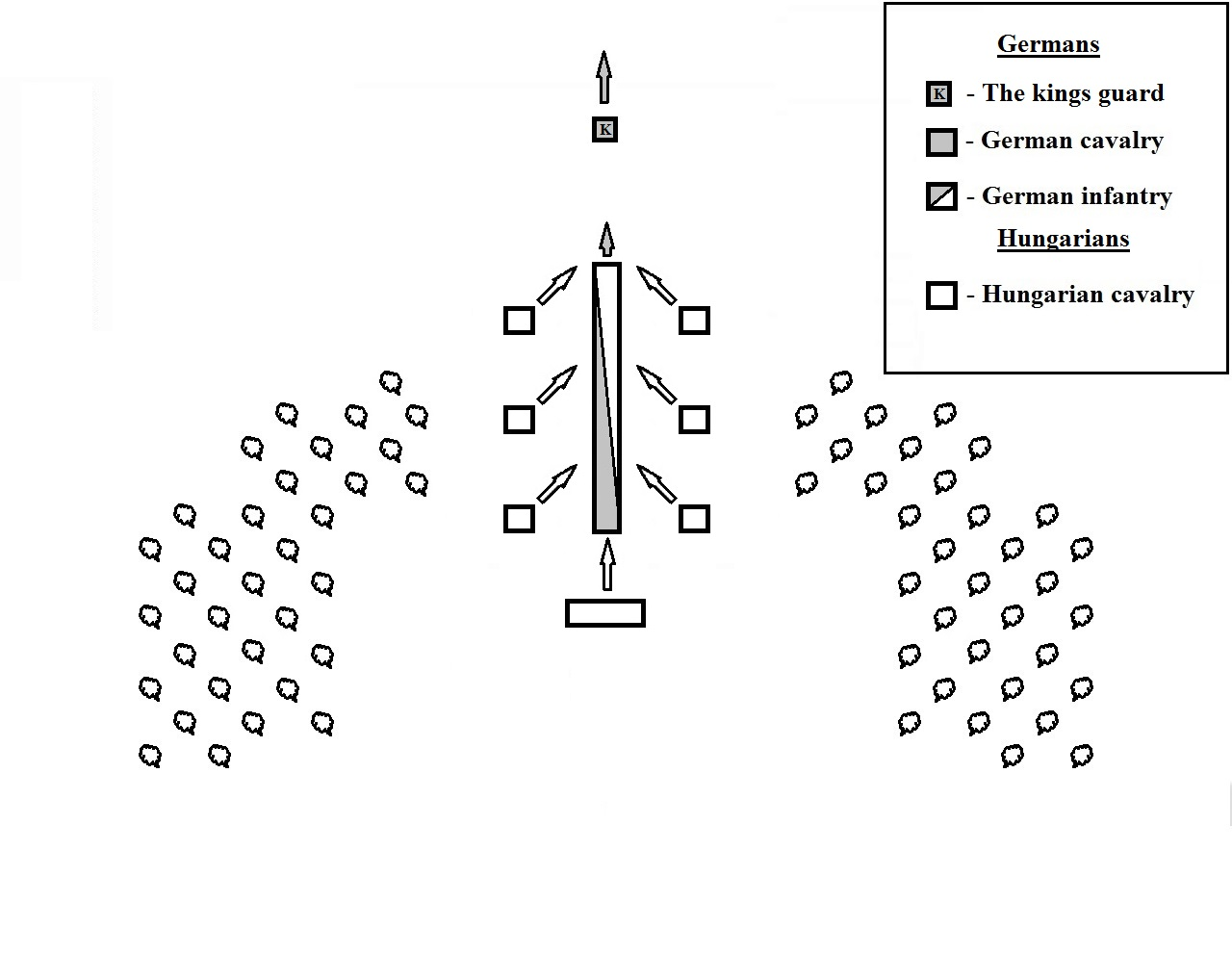
The last phase of the battle

At this point the king Louis the Child had to be among the infantry, which marched after the German cavalry from far behind, thinking that they won the battle, but when he arrived to the new battle scene, he saw that his bravest soldiers were slaughtered by the Hungarians, shortly before. From Liutprand of Cremona's account we can understand very well that he was not part of the slaughter of the cavalry, and he saw only the result of it a little later. He narrates his astonishment, despair at that moment, and the fact that he was totally fooled and misled by their clever tactics.

The remaining German infantry troops started to run away in despair, trying to save their lives. Probably the bodyguard unit of the king, which was mounted, managed to save him, and take him away quickly from the battlefield, while the Hungarians were busy of slaughtering the running German infantry, which suffered very heavy losses, caused by the Hungarian horsemen, who because these were the rules of nomadic warfare (eliminate the beaten enemy and his commanders completely), pursued them all the way, killing every one in their reach.

The setting sun was already seven o'clock, and the luck of the war favored Louis' army, when the extremely cunning Hungarians prepared a trap face to face and pretended to run. When the king's people, who did not think of a trick, began to pursue them with great vigor, the ambushers, whom they believed to be defeated, attacked them from all sides and killed the Christians who thought they were victorious. The king himself was amazed that he had turned from victor to vanquished.

— Liutprand

== Aftermath ==
The king escaped, entering the nearest town with walls (probably Augsburg), but the Germans lost almost their entire army. The Hungarian losses were so light, that after just 10 days, on 22 June, they managed to annihilate, in the Battle of Rednitz, the other German army, the Frankish-Lorrainian-Bavarian one, which before the battle of Augsburg was expected to unite with the main army led by the king Louis the Child, and to fight together against the Hungarians, killing also the commanders of that army, among them Gebhard, Duke of Lorraine. So, the Hungarian army, with a "Napoleonean" tactic (István Bóna), cleverly managed to attack and beat these two armies separately.

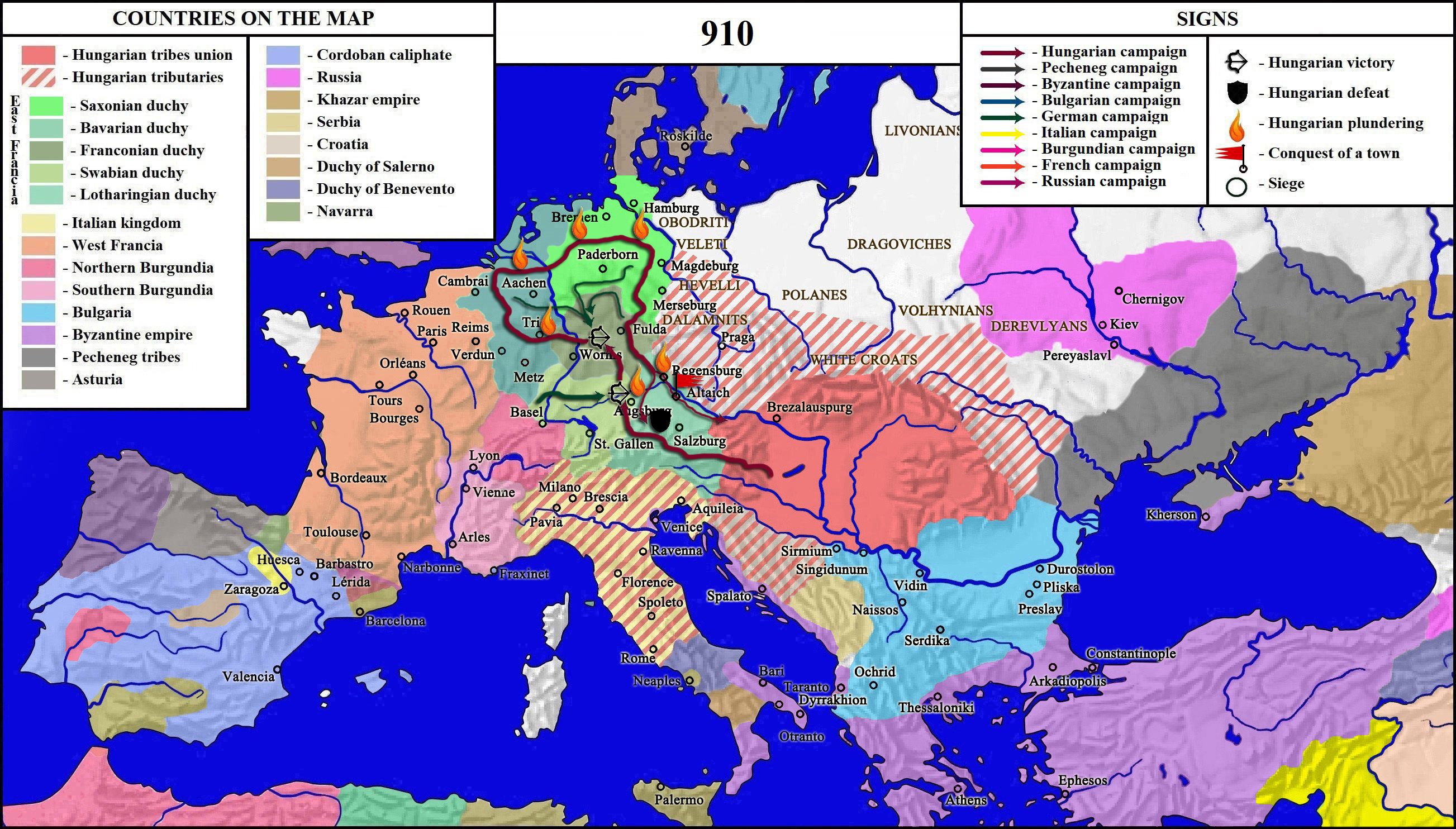
The Hungarian campaign of 910, which resulted the Hungarian victories from Augsburg and Rednitz

After these two battles the Hungarian army plundered and burned the German territories while nobody tried to fight them off again, retreating to the walled towns and castles, and waiting for them to turn back to Hungary. On their way back home, the Hungarians plundered the surroundings of Regensburg, burned Altaich and Osterhofen. Only the Bavarians managed to beat a minor plundering Hungarian unit at Neuching, but this did not change the fact: the annihilation of much of Germany's military power and capability to withstand the Hungarian attacks. This is demonstrated by the fact that after these defeats, Louis IV the Child, the German king, together with the Swabian, Frankish, Bavarian and Saxonian princes, agreed to pay tribute to the Hungarians.

However, Louis the Child didn't survive for long after these battles, dying in 911, maybe caused by the trauma and humiliation of these defeats. His successor as German king, Conrad I of Germany (911–918), refused to pay any tribute to the Hungarians (however, the dukes of Bavaria and Swabia paid from 917 tribute to the Magyars, who helped their fight against the German kings), and this caused frequent attacks on Germany made by the Hungarian nomadic armies (911, 913, 915, 917, 919, 924), which caused many defeats (Eresburg in 915, Püchen in 919), destruction (the burning of Bremen in 915, Basel in 917) and plunderings, and just a few successes (particularly in 913), which finally forced king Henry the Fowler in 924 to again start to pay tribute to the Hungarians, until 933, the Battle of Riade which ended the long (26 years) period of Hungarian military superiority and domination in Germany. However, the Hungarian raids in Germany continued until 955, their defeat in the second Battle of Lechfeld.
