= Battle of Rednitz =

910 battle

Battle of the Rednitz
- Part of the Hungarian invasions of Europe
Date	22 June, 910
Location	Rednitz River, in Franconia, Germany, near the border with Bavaria
Result	Hungarian victory

Belligerents
East Francia's united troops from Duchy of Franconia, Duchy of Lotharingia, Duchy of Bavaria	Principality of Hungary

Commanders and leaders
Gebhard, Duke of Lorraine †; Liudger, Count of Ladengau †	Unknown Hungarian commander

Strength
Unknown	Unknown

Casualties and losses
Heavy, among them Gebhard, Duke of Lorraine, Liudger, Count of Ladengau	Light

The Battle of Rednitz on 22 June 910, was a decisive victory of the Magyar cavalry over the East Francian - German kingdoms armies. The location of this battle cannot be determined with 100% certitude. The battle happened near the River Rednitz, in Franconia, near the border with Bavaria ("in confinio Bavariae et Franciae"). After the battle, the German king Louis the Child, together with the Swabian, Frankish, Bavarian, and Saxonian dukes, accepted to pay tribute to the Hungarian state.

It isn't known who the commander of the Hungarian army was (possibly a chieftain or a prince), but it was surely the same who 10 days before the battle of Rednitz, on 12 June 910 at the Battle of Augsburg inflicted a crushing defeat on the German army led by the King Louis the Child.

== Sources ==
Reginonis Continuator, Annales Alamannici German chronicles from the X. century.

== Background ==
This battle is a part of the Hungarian - German war which started in 900 with the death of Arnulf of Carinthia, with whom the Hungarians were in alliance, and after the Hungarian conquest of Pannonia (Transdanubia), and lasted until 910, the battles of Augsburg and Rednitz, both ending in disastrous German defeats, which forced the German king Louis the Child, and the German duchies to accept the territorial losses, and pay tribute to the Hungarians. During this war, after the Battle of Pressburg, the Hungarians continued their campaigns against East Francia, in order to subdue completely the Germans, beaten in 907. In 908 a Hungarian army invaded Thuringia, killing, in the Battle of Eisenach, its duke, Burchard, Duke Egino, and Rudolf I, Bishop of Würzburg. In 909 a Hungarian army invaded Bavaria, but it was defeated by Arnulf, Duke of Bavaria in a minor battle near Pocking.

== Prelude ==
King Louis the Child decided that the forces from all the German duchies should come together and fight the Hungarians. He even threatened with execution those who would not come under his flag. We know about two armies which gathered: one, consisting of Swabian and other forces from southern Germany, led nominally by the king Louis the Child (but because of his young age, in reality the leader of this army were Gozbert count of Alemannia and Managolt the count of Ladengau in Franconia), and the other, consisting from troops gathered from Franconia, Lotharingia (presuming that if the duke of Lotharingia led the army, he had to bring with him also an important troop from his country), Bavaria and maybe Saxony (however we do not know anything about the Saxons taking part of this battle, but we presume that they also heard the call and the threat of king Louis, and that maybe they want to put an end of the Hungarian attacks, because they suffered in 906 and 908 two devastating attacks from the Hungarian armies), led by Gebhard, Duke of Lorraine and Liudger, the count of Ladengau. These two armies tried to unite and fight the Hungarians together. The Hungarians learned about plans of Louis the Child, and sent quickly a Hungarian army, which rushed to prevent the joining of the Swabian and Frankish forces. They reached Augsburg on a forced march very quickly, totally unexpected for Louis the Child and his army, and, on 12 June 910, defeated in the battle of Augsburg the army of the King. Maybe the failure of the Frankish army to arrive at the battle scene was due to some Hungarian units, which "kept busy" the Franco-Lotharingian army, distracting the attention of its leaders from the other battle, the Battle of Augsburg. So, the Hungarian army, with a "Napoleonean" tactic (István Bóna), cleverly managed to attack, and deal with these two armies separately.

After that first battle, the Hungarian army marched north, to the border of Bavaria and Franconia, and met with the Franco-Bavaro-Lotharingian army led by Gebhard, Duke of Lorraine at Rednitz. We do not know who led the Hungarians, but it seem to be a military leader, and not the Grand Prince of the Hungarians, who in the 9th-10th centuries never took place in a battle outside of the Hungarian territories, the campaigns being led by more minor military leaders, the horka or one of the princes. We do not know about the strength of the two armies before the battle, but knowing the fact that at least three (Franconia, Lotharingia, Bavaria) if not four (Saxonia) East Francian duchies took part in the battle, and the army was led by a duke and a count, we can presume that the German army was bigger than the Hungarians, who before this battle had to fight another battle at Augsburg with the Swabian army of the German king Louis the Child, which, although was a victory, could cause them some losses too. Like in the before mentioned battle, in this battle too, met two war philosophies, styles and type of fighting, and weapons: the medieval European, inspired by the European-Frankish style of war and strategical thinking (consisting in heavy armours and weapons, the prevail of the strongest army without putting much importance on strategy), used by the Germans and the Nomadic War tactics, strategy and weapons used by the Hungarians (using exclusively cavalry, light or no armor, predominance of the bows and arrows, high mobility of the army corps, and predominance of delusive war tactics, which needed strategical thinking from the commanders).

== Battle ==
We do not know many details about the battle, just that the battle was in the border between Bavaria and Franconia, the German army was heavily defeated, the commanders of the army, Gebhard, Duke of Lorraine, Liudger, the count of Ladengau, and most of the soldiers were killed and the remaining soldiers ran away. From the Annales Alamannici we can also presume, that, like in the Battle of Augsburg, the Hungarians managed to fool the enemy troops, this time the Bavarians (Baugariis) in such a way, that they thought that they won the battle, and in that moment, when the enemy left its guard down, they attacked by surprise, and defeated them. Its possible, that the Hungarians could have used the same nomadic tactic of feigned retreat, with which they won the Battle of Augsburg ten days before.

== Aftermath ==
After these two battles the Hungarian army plundered and burned the German territories, and nobody tried to fight them again, retreating to the walled towns and castles, and waiting them to turn back in Hungary. On their way back home the Hungarians plundered the surroundings of Regensburg, burned Altaich and Osterhofen. Only the Bavarians managed to beat a minor plundering Hungarian unit at Neuching, but this did not change the fact of the annihilation of much of Germany's military power and capability to withstand the Hungarian attacks. This is demonstrated by the fact that after these defeats, Louis IV. the Child, the German king, together with the Swabian, Frankish, Bavarian, and Saxonian princes accepted to pay tribute to the Hungarians.

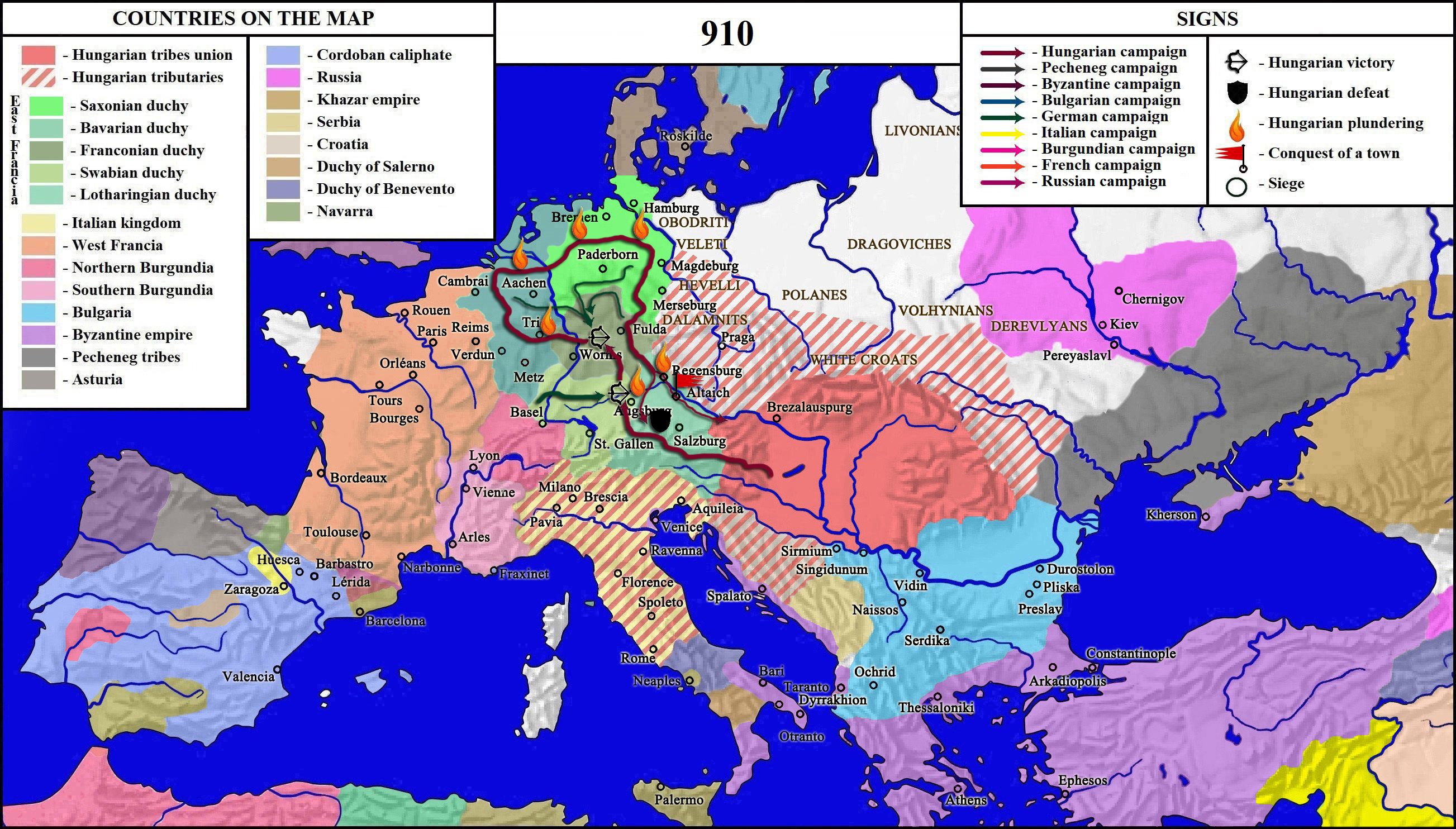
The Hungarian campaign of 910, which resulted the Hungarian victories from Augsburg and Rednitz.

Louis the Child had not survived for long after these battles, dying in 911, maybe caused by the trauma and humiliation of these defeats. His successor as German king, Conrad I of Germany (911-918), refused to pay any tribute to the Hungarians (however the dukes of Bavaria and Swabia paid from 917 tribute to the Magyars, who helped their fight against the German kings), and this caused frequent attacks on Germany made by the Hungarian nomadic armies (911, 913, 915, 917, 919, 924), which caused defeats (Eresburg - 915, Püchen 919), destruction (the burning of Bremen 915, Basel 917) and plundering, and just a few successes (particularly in 913), which finally forced king Henry the Fowler in 924 to start again to pay tribute to the Hungarians, until 933, the Battle of Riade which ended the long (26 years) period of Hungarian military superiority and domination in Germany. However, the Hungarian raids in Germany continued until 955, their defeat in the Second Battle of Lechfeld.

The ten years following the victories of 910, increased the self-confidence of the Hungarians, resulting in more frequent attacks towards West, and the widening of the length and range of these campaigns in territories, which escaped until then their attacks, like Lotharingia, West Francia, the border of Denmark, Burgundy.

== Strategic consequences ==
This battle concluded and demonstrated once and for all the military superiority of the light armored, quick moving nomadic warfare over what represented the peak of the Central and Western European style of warfare of those times: the post-Carolingian Germanic armies, represented by heavy armored, slow moving cavalry and pedestrians, the nomadic Hungarians heavily defeating them several times in the most categorical way.

After 4 years (907-910) of heavy defeats (Pressburg, Eisenach, Augsburg, Rednitz) from the hands of the Hungarian mounted archers, every of which resulting with the annihilation of the armies (this causing a "shortage" in soldiers to the Germans), and the deaths of the German commanders (among them princes, dukes, counts, margraves, bishops, archbishops), the German kings (Conrad I of Germany, Henry the Fowler) and other political leaders, decided not to fight again in an open field with the obviously tactically superior Magyars, fearing to have the same fate of their predecessors, but they retreated in their castles and walled towns (knowing that the Hungarians are not very skilled in sieges, because they have no siege equipments), waiting until they left their countries filled with spoils. It is interesting to know that not only the Germans who shared borders with the Hungarians chose not to fight with them (for example in 924 the German king Henry the Fowler retreated in his castle of Werla, instead of defending his duchy with fight, when hearing that the Hungarians crossed Saxony's borders, and started to plunder his realm), but also the French too, for example in 919, when the Hungarians invaded Lotharingia and France, the king Charles the Simple wanted to gather the forces of his kingdom against them, only the archbishop of Reims appeared from the nobles of the whole kingdom, who obviously hearing about the risks of a battle with the archers from the Carpathian Basin from the news which came from Germany, decided not to participate in a war against them, so the king withdrawed together with his 1500 soldiers, letting the Magyars to pillage his country. Because the fear of the European political and military leaders of the encounter with the Hungarians, after the years until 910, when in only four years (907-910) occurred four major battles (Battle of Pressburg in 907, Battle of Eisenach in 908, Battle of Augsburg in 910 and Battle of Rednitz), between 910 and 933 just two major battles took place between the Hungarians and their enemies: in 913 the Battle of Inn (a Bavarian-Swabian victory), and in 919 the Battle of Püchen (the Hungarians defeated the German king Henry the Fowler).

Another "tactic" used by the German kings and dukes between 910 and 933, was to pay off by tribute the peace within their borders. This inefficience and fear of the European armies to fight against the Hungarians made it possible for the latter to extend their raids into Western Europe: France, Burgundy and even northern Spain, and in the Balkans to Constantinople and Greek peninsula!

After long years of tribute payment to the Hungarians, the German king Henry the Fowler managed to figure out the appropriate tactics to beat the Hungarians, to build unbreakable walls around the towns, and to build an army consisting of heavy knights, with which he could withstand them with success in 933.
