= William I of Weimar =

William I
- Count of Weimar
- Reign: until 963
- Died: 16 April 963
- Noble family: House of Weimar
- Spouses: Adela of the Sorbian March, a Popponid (Elder House of Babenberg)
- Father: (?), Count

William I (died 16 April 963) is the first known member of the house of the Counts of Weimar.

== Life ==
William was first mentioned in a 949 deed as a count (Graf) in Thuringia. Originating from the Saalfeld region, he held large estates around Weimar, Jena, and Apolda, possibly stemming from late Duke Burchard of Thuringia, whose sons were expelled by King Henry the Fowler in 913.

He was probably married to Adela, a daughter of the Popponid (Elder House of Babenberg) duke Poppo of Thuringia, margrave of the Sorbian March, who had been deposed by the East Frankish king Arnulf in 892. William too appeared in the rank of a Thuringian margrave. From 953 to 955, he and several Wettin counts joined the revolt of Duke Liudolf of Swabia against King Otto the Great, wherefore he was temporarily deposed and exiled to the court of Otto's brother Duke Henry of Bavaria. By 956, however, William was re-installed into his offices.

He had at least three children:

- William II (d. 1003), called the Great, succeeded his father as Count of Weimar, Duke of Thuringia from 1002
- Poppo
- Sigbert
