= Adalbert of Metz =

Adalbert of Metz may refer to:

- Adalbert of Metz (died 841), count of Metz
- Adalbert of Metz (writer) (10th century)
- Adalbert I, Count of Metz (died 944)
- Adalbert II, Count of Metz (fl. 1022–1033)
- Adalbert, Duke of Lorraine (died 1048), count of Metz

== See also ==
- Adalbero of Metz (disambiguation)
