= Heimrich, Count in the Upper Rheingau =

Heimrich (Heimo) (740 – 5 May 795), Count in the Upper Rheingau (Oberrheingau), son of Cancor, Count of Hesbaye, and Angila. Heinrich was also Count of Lahngau, and lay abbot of Mosbach Abbey.

Heimrich was a leader in the forces of Charlemagne in his prosecution of the Saxon Wars and was killed in the Battle of Lüne and the Elbe fighting the Obotrite Slavs.

Heinrich married Eggiwiz of an unknown family. They had two children:

- Heinrich (765–812), Count of Saalgau
- Bubo of Grabfeldgau (763–795)

Through his son Heinrich, Heimrich was the grandfather of Poppo of Grapfeld, the progenitor of the Popponids (Elder House of Babenberg).

== Sources ==
- Reuter, Timothy (trans.), The Annals of Fulda, Manchester Medieval series, Ninth-Century Histories, Volume II, Manchester University Press, Manchester, 1992.
