= Poppo of Grapfeld =

Frankish nobleman

Poppo I (died 839–841) was a Frankish count in the Grapfeld (Grabfeld) from 819–839. As a grandson of Heimrich, Count in the Upper Rheingau, he was a descendant of the Robertian count Cancor. He was the founder of the Frankish Popponids (later more known as the House of Babenberg).

Poppo was a "leading man of the Franks" in 838-839, when he and several other noblemen, including Gebhard, Count of the Lahngau, Count Adalbert of Metz and Archbishop Odgar of Mainz opposed Louis the German's revolt against Emperor Louis the Pious.

Poppo was either the father or the grandfather of Margrave Henry of Franconia, Duke Poppo II of Thuringia and Egino.

== Sources ==
- The Annals of Fulda. (Manchester Medieval series, Ninth-Century Histories, Volume II.) Reuter, Timothy (trans.) Manchester: Manchester University Press, 1992.
