= Cancor =

Frankish count associated with Lorsch Abbey

Cancor (died 771) was a Frankish count associated with Lorsch Abbey. He was son of a noble lady, Williswinda.

Since Williswinda's only known husband before being widowed was named Robert (Rodbert), it has been proposed that Cancor was a son of Robert, Count or Duke in the Hesbaye, who lived in the 8th century. Robert II of Hesbaye may have been his brother or his nephew.

Together with his widowed mother Williswinda, Cancor founded Lorsch Abbey in 764, as a proprietary church and monastery on their estate Laurissa (Lorsch). They entrusted its government to Cancor's cousin Chrodegang, Bishop of Metz. Chrodegang dedicated the church and monastery to Saint Peter and became its first abbot. The founders later enriched the new abbey with further donations. In 766, shortly before his death, Chrodegang resigned as Abbot of Lorsch (owing to his duties as Bishop of Metz) and sent his brother Gundeland, another nephew of Cancor, to Lorsch as his successor.

Cancor married a noblewoman named Angila, of unknown parentage, probably before 766. Cancor and Angila had four children:

- Heimrich, Count in the Upper Rheingau (d. 5 May 795), Count in the Upper Rheingau, who died in the Battle of Lüne and the Elbe, a campaign in Charlemagne’s Saxon Wars
- Embert (d. 803), Bishop of Worms, 770-803
- Rachilt (d. after 1 November 792), Nun at Lorsch
- Euphemia, Nun at Lorsch.

His great-grandson, through his son Heimrich, would be Poppo I of Grabfeld († 839/841), the progenitor of the Popponids (Early or Franconian House of Babenberg). In turn, several later dynasties would descend from them, including the Younger or Austrian House of Babenberg, the Wittelsbach, the Henneberg, the Schweinfurt and the Babonids. The recurring name of Poppo (Bubo, Pabo, Babo, etc.) are likely to be variations of Robert, Cancor's father.

== Sources ==
- Innes, Matthew (2004). State and Society in the Early Middle Ages: The Middle Rhine Valley, 400–1000. Cambridge University Press.
- Riché, Pierre (1993). The Carolingians, a Family who Forged Europe. Translated by Allen, Michael Idomir. University of Pennsylvania Press.
