= Battle of Eisenach =

Battle between Hungarian and German forces

Coordinates: 50.979729124473°N 10.314588884416203°E

- Part of the Hungarian invasions of Europe
Date	3 August 908
Location	Eisenach, Thuringia
Result	Hungarian victory

Belligerents
East Francia	Principality of Hungary

Commanders and leaders
Burchard, Duke of Thuringia †; Egino, Duke of Thuringia †; Rudolf I, Bishop of Würzburg †	Unknown Hungarian Commander

Strength
Unknown	Unknown

Casualties and losses
Heavy together with all the commanders	Unknown (probably light)

The Battle of Eisenach in 908, was a crushing victory by a Hungarian army over an East Frankish army composed of troops from Franconia, Saxony, and Thuringia.

== Background ==
This battle is a part of the Hungarian - German war which started in 900, after the Hungarian conquest of Pannonia (Transdanubia), and lasted until 910, the battles of Augsburg and Rednitz, both ending in disastrous German defeats, which forced the German king Louis the Child, and the German duchies to accept the territorial losses, and pay tribute to the Hungarians.

== Prelude ==
After the Battle of Pressburg ended with a catastrophical defeat of the attacking East Francian armies led by Luitpold prince of Bavaria, the Hungarians following the nomadic warfare philosophy: destroy your enemy completely or force him to submit to you, first forced Arnulf prince of Bavaria to pay them tribute, and let their armies cross the lands of the duchy to attack other German and Christian territories, then started long range campaigns against the other East Francian duchies.

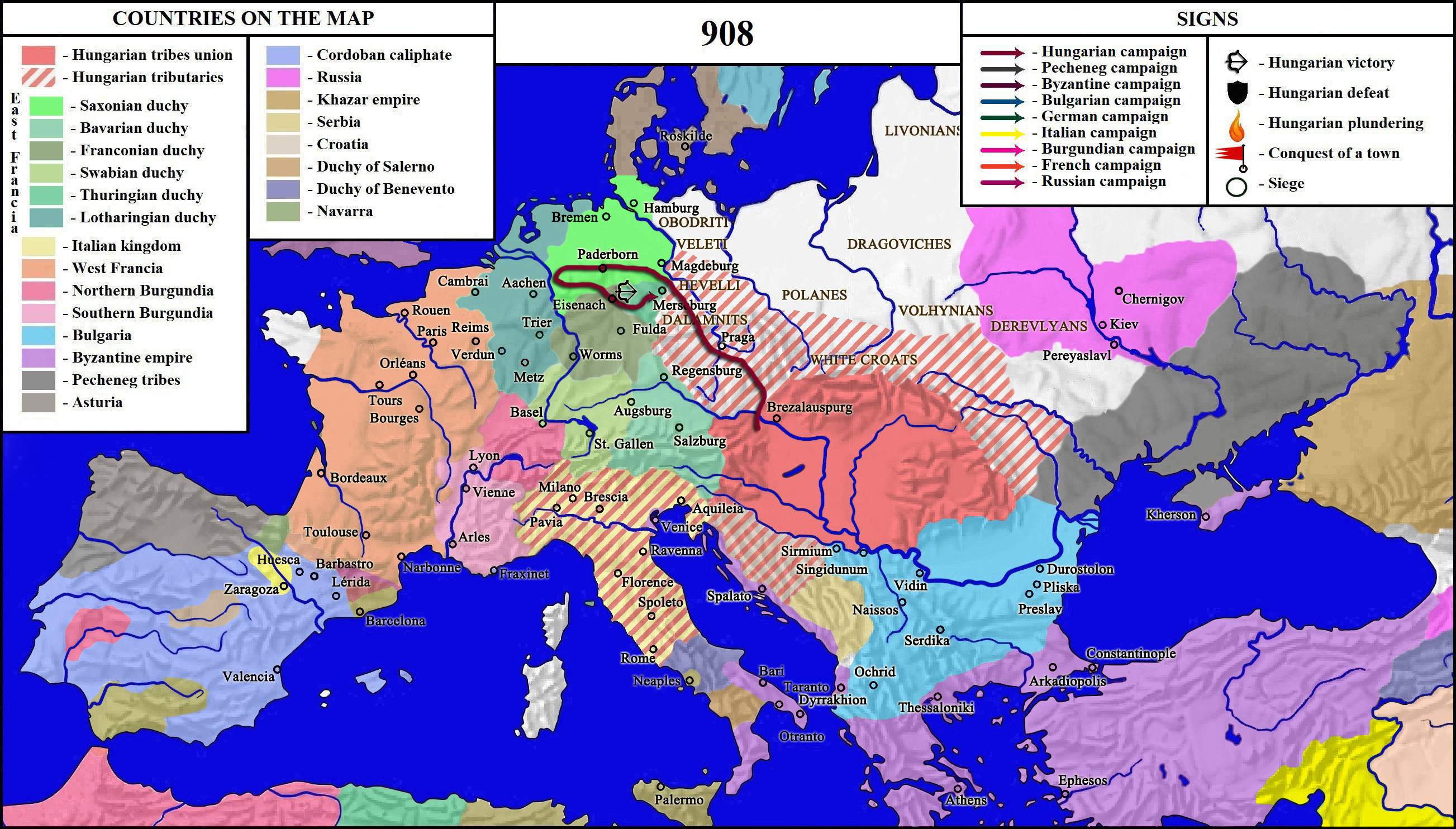
The Hungarian campaign of 908, and the battle of Eisenach

The first of these was the attack of one Hungarian army to Thuringia and Saxony. However this was not the first attack of the Hungarians in Saxonia, because two years earlier two Hungarian armies devastated the duchy one after another, after being asked to come by the Slavic tribe of Dalamanci, which lived near Meissen, which were threatened by the Saxons attacks and plunderings. In their campaign of 908, the Hungarians used again the Dalamancian territory to attack Thuringia and Saxonia, coming from Bohemia or Silesia, where Slavic tribes lived, like they did in 906. The Thuringian and Saxonian forces, under the lead of Burchard, Duke of Thuringia met the Hungarians on the battlefield at Eisenach. The number of the forces are unknown, and the leader of the Hungarian forces neither, although it is possible that it was the same commander who led the Hungarians to great victories in the battles of Pressburg in 907, Augsburg and Rednitz in 910, because of the categorical outcome of those battles (annihilation of the enemy forces together with their leaders).

== Battle ==
We do not know many details about this battle, but we know that it was a crushing defeat for the Germans, and the leader of the Christian army: Burchard, Duke of Thuringia was killed, along with Egino, Duke of Thuringia and Rudolf I, Bishop of Würzburg, together with the most part of the German soldiers. The Hungarians then plundered Thuringia and Saxonia as far north as Bremen, returning home with many spoils.

== Aftermath ==
After this victory the Hungarian campaigns against the German duchies continued until 910, the battles of Augsburg and Rednitz, ended with disastrous German defeats, after which the German king Louis the Child concluded peace with the Principality of Hungary, accepting to pay tribute to the latter, and recognizing the Hungarian territorial gains during the war.

== Sources ==
- Gesta Regum Francorum excerpta, ex originali ampliata.
