= Adalbero of Metz =

Adalbero of Metz may refer to:

- Several bishops of Metz:
  - Adalbero I of Metz (r. 929–954)
  - Adalbero II of Metz (r. 984–1005)
  - Adalbero III of Metz (r. 1047–1072)
  - Adalbero IV of Metz (r. 1104–1115)

== See also ==
- Adalbert of Metz (disambiguation)
