= Henry I (archbishop of Trier) =

- Archbishop of Trier
- Church: Catholic Church
- Diocese: Electorate of Trier
- In office: 956–964

Personal details
- Died: 3 July 964

Henry I (died 3 July 964) was the Archbishop of Trier from 956 until his death.

Henry was a member of the Popponids (Elder House of Babenberg). His brother was Poppo I, Bishop of Würzburg, and another possible brother was the Berthold of Schweinfurt. Henry was trained with Wolfgang, the future saint and Bishop of Regensburg, in the Abbey of Reichenau. Henry and Wolfgang were later trained at the cathedral school in Würzburg by Stephen of Novara. In 956, Otto I of Germany appointed Henry to the vacant see of Trier.

On 26 May 961, Henry with the archbishops Bruno I of Cologne and William of Mainz crowned Otto's son Otto II king. Henry later accompanied Otto I on his campaigns in Italy. He died in Rome during an epidemic of malaria that broke out in the imperial army caused by nearby pestilent marshes. Henry was buried in Parma but his remains were later translated to Trier Cathedral.

== Notes ==
Preceded by Robert	Archbishop of Trier; 956–964	Succeeded by Dietrich I
