= Adalhard of Babenberg =

10th-century Frankish nobleman

Adalhard of Babenberg (died 903) was a member of the Frankish Popponids (Elder House of Babenberg). He was the son of Margrave Henry I of Babenberg and Ingeltrude of Friuli.

During the Babenberg feud, he was arrested by the Conradine leaders in 902 and executed at the Reichstag of Forchheim in 903.
