= Parthian shot =

Light cavalry hit-and-run tactic used by the Parthians

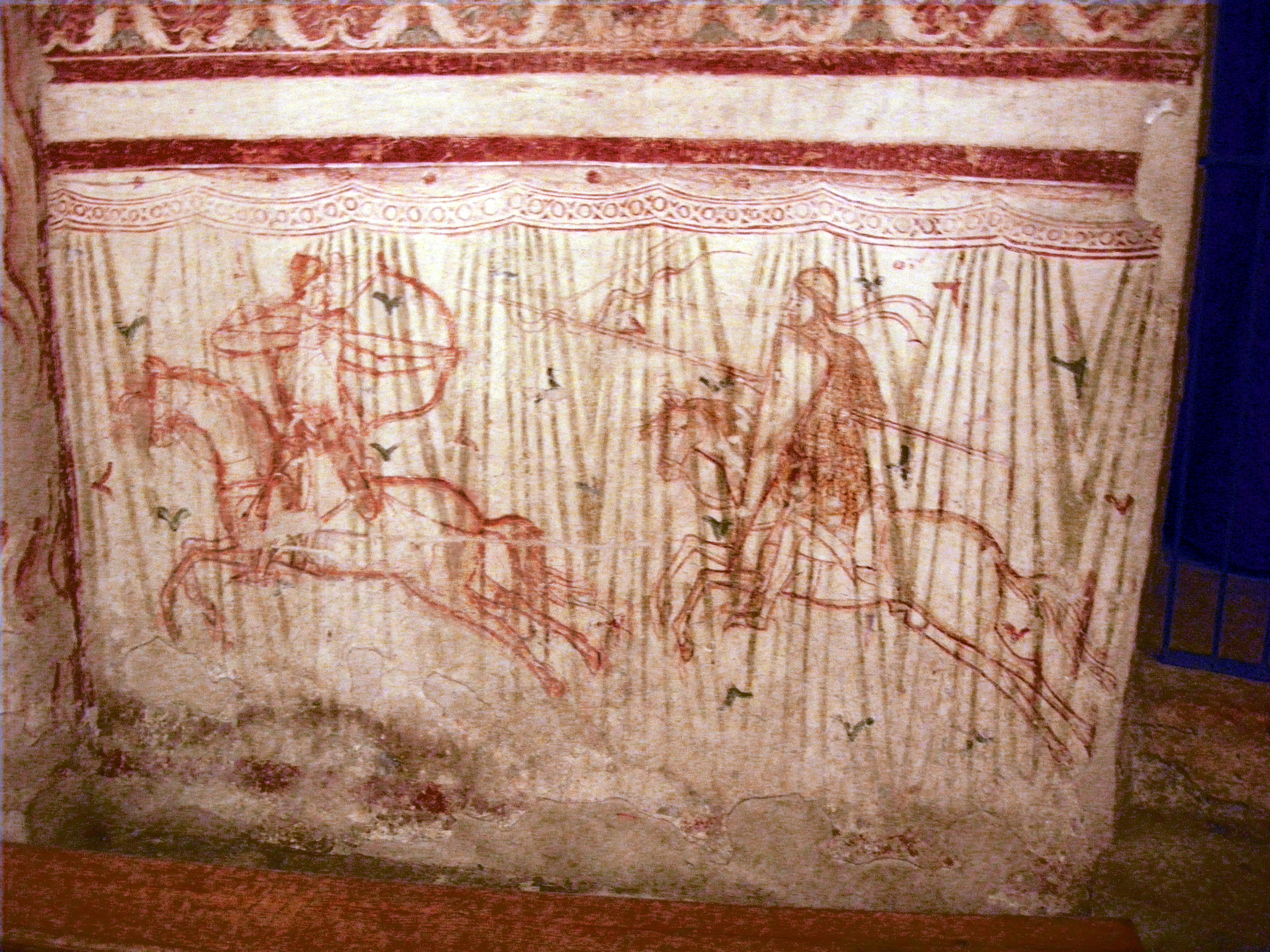
A Hungarian mounted archer shooting a pursuing knight in the Battle of Lechfeld (910 CE). Their victory is an example of successful use of feigned retreat and the Parthian shot.

The Parthian shot is a light cavalry hit-and-run tactic used by horse archers. By making a real or feigned retreat at full gallop, the riders turn their bodies around to shoot the often slower, heavier armored pursuing enemies. First used by the Parthians, an ancient Iranian empire, it continued to be used by multiple civilizations especially those of Eurasian nomadic origins throughout the medieval period.

"Parthian shot" is also used metaphorically to describe a barbed insult delivered as the speaker departs.

== Technique ==
The maneuver required significant equestrian and archery skill, since the rider's both hands held their composite bow and their body was turned around. As the stirrup had not been invented at the time of the Parthians, the rider relied solely on balance to stay mounted and guide the horse.

== History and usage ==
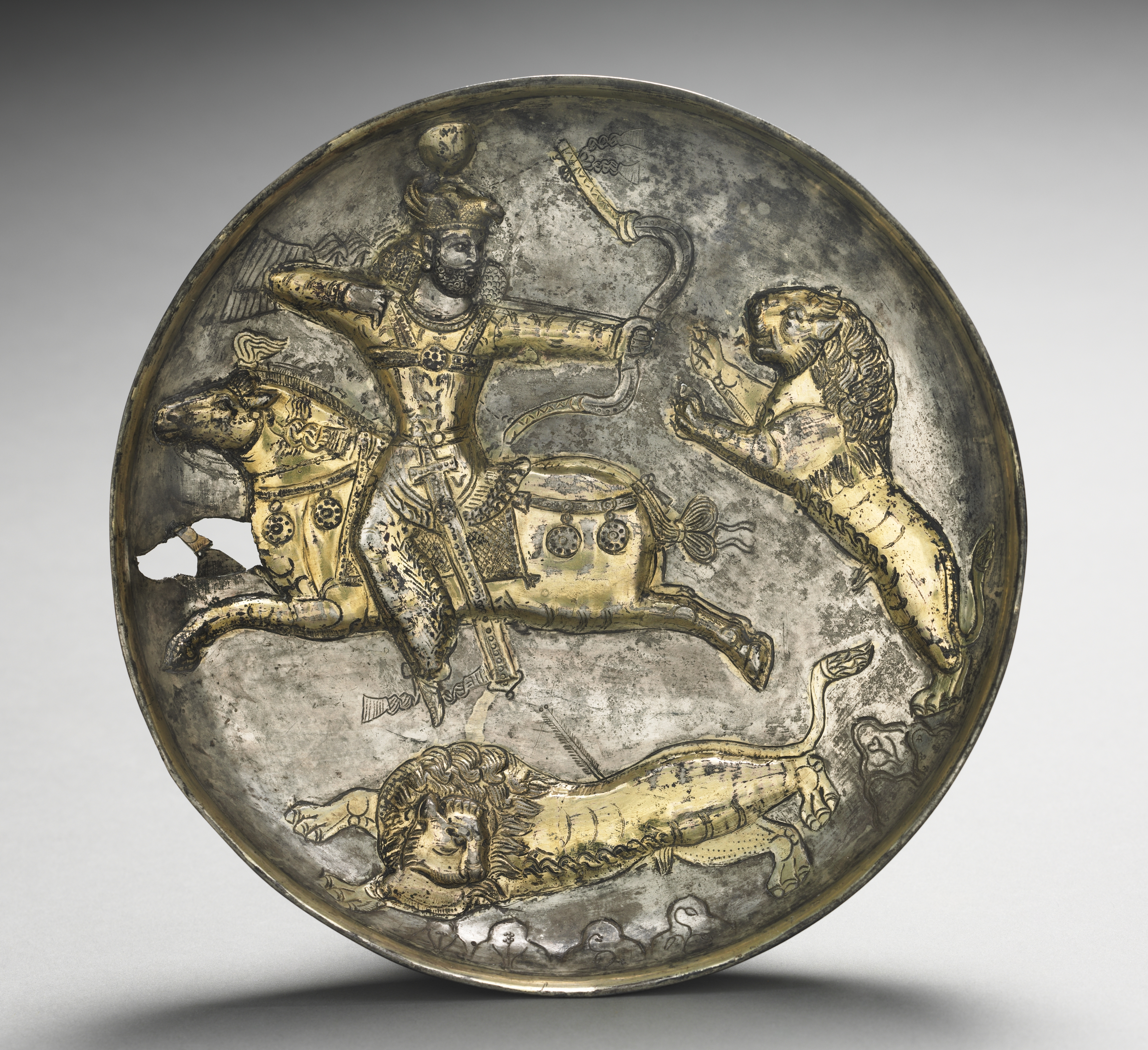
King Hormizd II (303–309 CE) of the Sasanian Empire, shown hunting a lion using the Parthian shot

The Parthians used the tactic to great effect in their victory over the Roman general Crassus in the Battle of Carrhae (53 BCE). After them and their successors, the Sasanians, the Parthian shot was characteristic of most nomads of the Eurasian Steppe, such as the Scythians, Xiongnu, Huns, Turks, Magyars (Hungarians), Koreans, and Mongols, but was not limited to them, having also been used by the Urartians and the Comanche.

A tactic similar to the Parthian shot was attributed to the Phoenicians from Sidon by Silius Italicus.

In the medieval period, the Parthian shot was used by the Hungarians in their victory in Battle of Lechfeld (910 CE) against the combined forces of East Francia and Swabia; by the Seljuk Turks under Alp Arslan at the Battle of Manzikert (1071 CE) against the Byzantine Empire; by the Ghurid Empire under Muhammad of Ghor at the Second Battle of Tarain (1192 CE) against war elephants, heavy cavalry, and infantry from the Rajput confederacy; by the Mongolian general Subutai at the Battle of Legnica (1241 CE) against the Polish; and later by the Afsharid Empire at the Battle of Karnal (1739 CE) against the Mughal Empire.

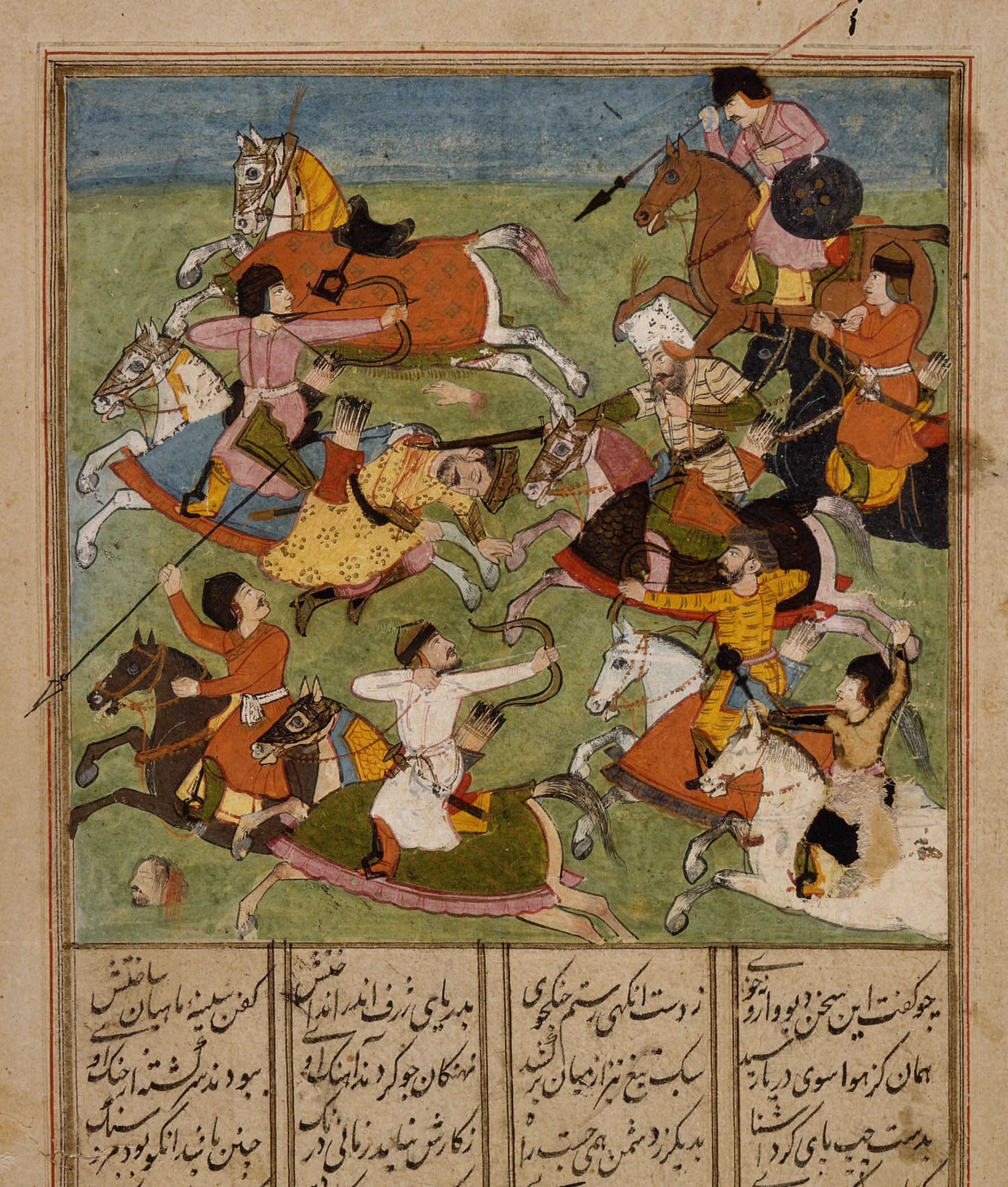
An early 17th-century Mughal battle scene painting

== As metaphor ==
"Parthian shot" is used as a metaphor to describe a barbed insult, delivered as the speaker departs.

You wound, like Parthians, while you fly,
And kill with a retreating eye.

— Samuel Butler, An Heroical Epistle of Hudibras to His Lady (1678)

With which Parthian shot he walked away, leaving the two rivals open-mouthed behind him.

— Arthur Conan Doyle, A Study in Scarlet (1886)

== In popular culture ==
in the 2026 combat flight simulation videogame Ace Combat 8: Wings Of Theve, the emblems of the Sotoan antagonist squadron "Lux Lunae" features a silhouetted knight performing a Parthian Shot against an illuminated moon.

Additionally, one of the main antagonists, Shadow 22, performs an aerial dogfighting maneuver with his Sukhoi Su-57 dubbed by executive producer Kazutoki Kono during development as "the Parthian Shot", which consists of performing a Kulbit while firing missiles at the pursuing enemy plane behind it.

== See also ==
- Feint
- Caracole, a similar cavalry maneuver
- Cantabrian circle
- L'esprit de l'escalier, also called staircase wit
