= Henry, Margrave of the Franks =

9th-century Carolingian military commander

Henry (Note: German Heinrich; in the Latin of the Annals of Fulda his name is spelled Heimrih, Heimrich, Heimricus or Heimrichus, in the Annals of Saint Vaast, it is Heinricus.) (died 28 August 886) was the leading military commander of the last years of the Carolingian Empire. He was commander-in-chief under Kings Louis the Younger and Charles the Fat. His early career was mostly restricted to East Francia, his homeland, but after Charles inherited West Francia in 884 he was increasingly active there. During his time, raids by the Vikings (mainly Danes) peaked in Francia. The sources describe at least eight separate campaigns waged by Henry against the Vikings, most of them successful.

Henry is described in the sources as a Saxon, Frank or Thuringian. His title is given variously as count (Latin comes), margrave (marchensis) or duke (dux). The territory he governed is described variously in the sources as Francia, Neustria or Austrasia, perhaps indicating that his military command covered most of the north of the empire from the Breton March in the west to Frisia and Saxony in the east.

== Family ==
Henry's family has been called the Popponids because the name Poppo was particularly common among them. The Popponids later came to be better known as the (Elder) House of Babenberg. It is speculated that he was a son of Count Poppo of Grapfeld, or perhaps of Poppo's son, Christian I of Grapfeld, and his wife, Heilwig. His brother was Poppo, Duke of Thuringia. The Popponids were probably related to the Hattonids, and Henry may have "inherited" his positions in Saxony (from Banzleib) and in Austrasia (from Banzleib's brother Adalbert).

Henry's wife was possibly Ingeltrude, the daughter of Eberhard of Friuli; a memorial book of the abbey of Reichenau names a Henry (Heimirich) and an Ingeltrude (Engildrud) side by side.

Henry had three sons, and probably at least one daughter. His sons all died during the so-called Babenberg feud with the rival Conradine family:

- Adalbert (c. 854 – 9 September 906), captured and executed
- Adalhard (died 903), captured and executed
- Henry II (died 902), killed in battle

Widukind of Corvey calls Adalbert a "close relative through his sister" of King Henry I of Germany, which led Emil Kimpen to conclude that Henry I's mother, Hathui (Hedwig, Hadewig), was Adalbert's sister and Duke Henry's daughter. This suggestion has been widely accepted, not least because it explains the adoption of the name Henry by Henry I's family, the Liudolfings. In this case, it is through Duke Henry that the name ultimately entered the East Frankish (German) and West Frankish (French) royal families, the Ottonians and Capetians. Hathui married Duke Otto of Saxony. Their son, Henry I, had a daughter, Hedwig, named after her grandmother, who married Hugh the Great and became the mother of Henry I, Duke of Burgundy, and great-grandmother of King Henry I of France.

The House of Babenberg, which governed the March of Austria from 976 until 1246, is generally regarded as descending from the Popponids, possibly through an unnamed daughter of Henry. The names of the children (Henry, Ernest, Poppo, Adalbert and Leopold) of the first known Babenberger, Margrave Leopold I, are strongly suggestive of a link with Henry.

== Life ==
Henry is described by Abbo Cernuus in his Bella Parisiacae urbis as a Saxon. It is more likely he was a Thuringian.

=== Reign of Louis the Younger ===
Henry is described by the Annals of Fulda as the "leader of the army" (princeps militiae) of Louis the Younger when the latter rebelled against his father, King Louis the German, in 866. Louis was joined in his revolt by his younger brother, Charles the Fat. The brothers may have been upset by the grant of Bavaria to their older brother, Carloman, as a sub-kingdom in 864. During the short revolt, Louis sent Henry on a mission to Duke Rastislav of Moravia. The rebellion was soon patched up, however, and Louis received Saxony as a sub-kingdom, while Charles got Alemannia.

In 871, a Saxon vassal of Henry's was blinded on the orders of Louis the German, which prompted Louis the Younger and Charles to temporarily cut off relations with their father in solidarity with Henry. Nothing is known of Henry's reaction to this incident. It has been suggested that Louis the German took advantage of his sons' insubordination to remove Henry from power in Saxony and replace him with Duke Bruno (brother of the aforementioned Otto, who probably married Henry's daughter).

In 876, Louis the German died and his sons became kings in full in their respective sub-kingdoms. Henry remained in the service of Louis the Younger. In 880, he was sent with Count Adalhard of Metz to make war on Count Theobald of Arles, the chief commander of the army of Hugh of Lotharingia, Louis's second cousin who had been excluded from the succession. According to the Annals of Fulda, Henry won a "bloody victory". The victorious army then joined the rest of Louis the Younger's forces and marched on Mâcon, which they took from the rebel leader Boso, who had made himself king in Burgundy and Provence in opposition to the Carolingians.

=== Reign of Charles the Fat ===
Louis the Younger died in January 882 and was succeeded by Charles the Fat, who was made Emperor of the Carolingian realm the year before and reunited the East Frankish kingdom of his father Louis the German. Under Charles, Henry's career was a succession of battles with Viking raiders. Charles almost immediately sent Henry with an army to besiege Asselt, where an army of Vikings was encamped. According to the Annals of Fulda, Henry and Charles's nephew Arnulf led the advance guard, with Henry in charge of the Frankish contingent and Arnulf leading the Bavarian troops. Charles arrived with the main force in May 882.

Having received oaths from the Viking leaders, the siege of Asselt was considered a success and the Frankish army withdrew. After spending some time at his Christmas court in 882, the emperor sent Henry against some Vikings who had raided Deventer. According to the Annals of Fulda, Henry "settled matters as well as he could, and returned." In late 883, Henry marched against the Vikings again, inflicting severe losses on them. According to the Annals of Fulda, "it is said that not one escaped". Henry, however, was wounded in the fighting.

In 884, Henry won two more victories over the Vikings, slaughtering them "wherever they wanted to go to plunder", according to the annalist of Fulda. Some Vikings who had been harrying West Francia then overwintered in the Hesbaye in 884–85. In early 885, Henry and Archbishop Liutbert of Mainz surprised them in their camp. The survivors fled by night, leaving their plunder behind. Henry and Liutbert are the most prominent men (after the Carolingian kings) in the latter part of the Mainz recension of the Annals of Fulda. This is probably because its author was a partisan of Louis the Younger, as Henry and Liutbert had been Louis's chief advisors.

In 885, Godfrid, one of the Viking leaders at Asselt who had sworn oaths to Charles, taken baptism and received Frisia, was accused of plotting with the emperor’s cousin Hugh to seize Lotharingia. Henry tricked him into a meeting and killed him with his followers. According to the Annals of Saint-Vaast, one of Godfrid's followers, Gerolf, defected and plotted Godfrid's downfall with Henry. Henry then captured Hugh at Gondreville and handed him over to the emperor, who had him blinded and imprisoned in the monastery of Saint Gall.

In 885, a large Viking force laid siege to Paris. The defence of the city fell to Bishop Joscelin and Count Odo. According to the Annals of Saint-Vaast, after the Vikings destroyed one of Paris's towers, Joscelin sent Count Erkenger of Melun to East Francia with specific instructions to ask Henry to come with an army.

As a result, in 886 Henry led the first army to relieve the siege. it was in the field from 9 February until 1 May, but its only actions were skirmishes with Vikings who occasionally strayed too far from their fortifications. By July, Charles himself was leading a huge army towards Paris. Henry was again sent off with an advance guard while the emperor was still at Metz. It was during this expedition that Henry's horse fell into a trap near Quierzy and he was cut off from his men and killed on 28 August. The same basic account of Henry's death is found in the Annals of Saint-Vaast, the chronicle of Regino of Prüm and the Annals of Fulda.

== Death, burial and epitaph ==
The deaths of Hugh and Henry in August placed Count Odo in a preeminent position in West Francia. While writers looking back tended to see him as succeeding his brother Robert the Strong directly, he did not in fact do so. Rather, the sudden deaths of Hugh and Henry followed by that of the Emperor Charles less than two years later left a vacuum in the West that Odo was able to take advantage of to have himself elected king in 888.

The Annals of Fulda appear to assign blame for Henry's death when recording that he was "abandoned by his men". Regino records that Henry was buried in the Abbey of Saint-Médard de Soissons. An eight-distich epitaph for Henry was added by an eleventh-century hand to a copy of Regino's chronicle. A marginal note (Note: cuius epitaphium in fine huius libri invenies ad hoc signum ⳩: "whose epitaph you will find at the end of the book beside this sign ⳩".) beside Regino's account of Henry's death directs the reader to the epitaph, which appears at the end of the manuscript. (Note: Heinrici magni Francorum germinis alti hic recubat corpus: sit sibi vera salus. Saxonibus, Francis, Fresonibus ille triarchos prefuit, hinc trino stemmate fretus ovet. Consiliis cuius res publica crevit et armis pendula forte prius: idque repende, Deus. Hostes si minuit, si se tulit obice nostros: insigni palma hoc, pie Christe, nota. Tu reddis longum pro te morientibus aevum: huic pro te strato, rex, bona redde polo. Martyrii testis sonipes perfossus et arma. vir quoque traiectus: esto corona Deus. Ecce hoc iusticium prelambens signa leonis te tetigit virgo: laus in utroque Deo. Dic aliquid, lector, copulans suspiria votis, plange viri casum, quin magis immo virum.)

== Titles ==
By 871, according to the Annals of Fulda, Henry was a count (Latin comes), a title the annalist prefers for him until the end of his life, even after he had attained higher rank. By contrast, Regino of Prüm, usually calls Henry a duke (dux), a title implying military command and the control of territory much larger than a county. Under the year 885, the Annals of Saint Vaast call Henry the Duke of the Austrasians (dux Austrasiorum).

The Annals of Fulda describe Henry in 886 as "the margrave of the Franks, who held Neustria at that time" (marchensis Francorum, qui in id tempus Niustriam tenuit). This has been interpreted as "a generalised military responsibility which included Neustria". Karl Ferdinand Werner goes further, saying that "in all the Frankish kingdoms properly so-called," that is, in Austrasia, Neustria and Franconia, (Note: The ethnically Frankish lands east of the Rhine.) "Charles gave all powers to his commander-in-chief Henry."

On the other hand, Donald Jackman sees Henry's final command as restricted to Neustria proper, where he succeeded Hugh the Abbot after the latter's death on 12 May 886. According to Henry's epitaph, he was "triarch" (triarchos) of the Saxons, Franks and Frisians, which may mean that he ruled over them simultaneously or in succession. Rule over Frisia may have indicated in fact a march in western Saxony bordering Frisia. Jackman favours three successive marcher commands for Duke Henry, while Matthias Becher suggests that triarchos is a corruption of trimarchio (three-times margrave) under the influence of demarchus (people-ruler) and indicates that Henry acquired multiple marches simultaneously. There is no question that Henry in the reign of Charles the Fat was second only to the king in power.
