= Adalbert of Babenberg =

Bishop of Würzburg (c. 854 – 906)

Adalbert of Babenberg (c. 854 – 9 September 906) was a member of the Frankish Popponids (Elder House of Babenberg). He was the son of Margrave Henry I of Babenberg and Ingeltrude of Friuli.

Graf Adalbert was one of the most important representatives during the Babenberg feud, a quarrel between the Babenbergs and Conradine families. His sister Hedwiga was married to Otto I of Saxony.

On 27 February 906 an army led by Adalbert attacked the Conradines near Fritzlar. During the fight Conrad the Elder was killed. After Adalbert had withdrawn to Castle Theres he was besieged by the royal army. The king's envoy, archbishop of Mainz and chancellor Hatto I, promised him a safe conduct. However, when Adalbert left the castle he was taken prisoner, convicted and beheaded. After that the Babenbergs lost all their offices and possessions in the Duchy of Franconia.
