= Conrad, Duke of Thuringia =

9th century Thuringian ruler

Conrad (died 27 February 906), called the Old or the Elder, was the Duke of Thuringia briefly in 892–93. He was the namesake of the Conradiner family and son of Udo of Neustria. His mother (probably) was a daughter of Conrad I of Logenahe (832–860). He was the count of the Oberlahngau (886), Hessengau (897), Gotzfeldgau (903), Wetterau (905), and Wormsgau (906). He united all of Hesse under his political control and under his heirs this territory became the Duchy of Franconia.

Early in his career, Conrad feuded with the Babenbergs Henry of Franconia and Adalbert. Conrad's chief residence was Friedeslar in Hesse. He was a comes (count) and ministerialis of Arnulf of Germany in 891. In 892, Duke Poppo was deposed from his offices and replaced in Thuringia and the Sorbian March by Conrad. He only held the dukedom briefly before he was replaced by Burchard. The reason for his appointment probably represent a change in Arnulf's policy in favour of the Conradines over the Babenbergs; but Conrad's short tenure may reflect his lack of support in Thuringia or an unwillingness on his part to be confined there.

Around 880, Conrad married Glismod (also spelled Glismuot or Glismut). She may have been a daughter of Arnulf of Carinthia, or else a relative of the earlier Thuringian dukes (perhaps a daughter of Thachulf), thus giving her husband a hereditary claim to Thuringia. They had four children: Conrad the Younger, the future king of Germany; Eberhard, future duke of Franconia; Otto (also Udo or Odo), future count in the Ruhrgau and the middle Lahn, who died in 918; and a daughter, name unknown.

In 906, as a result of a feud with the Babenbergs, Conrad was killed in battle near Fritzlar and was buried in the church of Saint Martin at Weilburg. His eldest son was also old enough to participate in this war. His widow, Glismod, died in 26 April 924 and was buried next to him.

== Sources ==
- Reuter, Timothy. Germany in the Early Middle Ages 800–1056. New York: Longman, 1991.
- Reuter, Timothy (trans.) The Annals of Fulda. (Manchester Medieval series, Ninth-Century Histories, Volume II.) Manchester: Manchester University Press, 1992.
- Bernhardt, John W. Itinerant Kingship and Royal Monasteries in Early Medieval Germany, c. 936–1075. Cambridge: Cambridge University Press, 1993.
