= Banzleibs =

Frankish magnate of the Hattonid family in the Carolingian Empire

Banzleibs was a mid-ninth-century Frankish magnate of the Hattonid family in the Carolingian Empire.

He was the Count of Maine in 832. By 838, when he was still at Le Mans, he had been appointed by the emperor, Louis the Pious, as comes et Saxoniae patriae marchio: "count and margrave of the Saxon fatherland". After the death of Louis in 840, Banzleibs supported Lothair in the subsequent civil war which arose between Louis's sons. Along with his brothers, Adalbert, Count of Metz, and Hatto, Count of Nassau, Banzleibs was a staunch opponent of Louis the German and the creation of an East Frankish kingdom. On 14 December 840 at Rösbeck Louis dispossessed Banzleibs of his benefices and public offices and granted them to Warin, Abbot of Corvey. Banzleibs does not appear in any further records after this date and it has been suggested that he was killed in battle with Louis's forces.

== Sources ==
- Goldberg, Eric J. "Popular Revolt, Dynastic Politics, and Aristocratic Factionalism in the Early Middle Ages: The Saxon Stellinga Reconsidered." Speculum, Vol. 70, No. 3. (Jul., 1995), pp 467–501.
