= Adalbert of Metz (writer) =

Cambridge, Queens' College, MS 19, folio 7v. End of the table of contents and start of the text of the Speculum Gregorii.

Adalbert of Metz (fl. 10th century) was the compiler of the Speculum Gregorii, a selection of Latin excerpts from Gregory the Great's Moralia in Job.

What little is known of Adalbert comes from two sources, his Speculum and his epitaph. In the prologue of the Speculum, he calls himself a deacon. In the epilogue, he calls himself a monk and priest. His epitaph, composed by Gerbert of Aurillac, says that he was of noble origin and died young on 12 February. The date of his death is given variously as 962 or about 980. In the 16th century, Johannes Trithemius identified his monastery as Saint-Vincent de Metz.

Adalbert was inspired to compose the Speculum ('Mirror')—a title he chose—by conversations with his friend Hermann, to whom he dedicated the work. He selected 193 excerpts for inclusion. His criteria of selection were moral and topical. He gave each excerpt a heading of his own devising, divided the work into four books and provided a table of contents.

There are several known manuscripts but no critical edition, although there is a published study of one 15th-century copy. One manuscript, produced in France around 970, was already at Christ Church Canterbury before the century's end, when a copy was a made. The French copy wound up in the library of Salisbury Cathedral while the Canterbury copy found its way to Trinity College, Cambridge.

== Bibliography ==
- Seow, Choon-Leong (2023). "Gregorian Exegesis of Job in the Latin West from the Seventh to Twelfth Centuries". In Choon-Leong Seow (ed.). The Many Faces of Job, Part 1: The Premodern Period. De Gruyter. pp. 351–389.
- Valgimogli, Lorenzo, ed. (2006). Lo speculum Gregorii di Alberto di Metz. SISMEL edizioni del Galluzzo.
- Wasselynck, René (1962). "Les compilations des «Moralia in Job» du VII^{e} au XII^{e} siècle". Recherches de théologie ancienne et médiévale. 29: 5–32. JSTOR 26187640.
- Wasselynck, René (1967). "La table de Capitula du «Speculum» d'Adalbert de Metz". Recherches de théologie ancienne et médiévale. 34: 255–262. JSTOR 26188043.
- Wright, Charles D. (2021). Brandon Hawk (ed.). "Adalbert of Metz". Knowledge Commons. doi:10.17613/t2yef-z8m11.
