= Mosbach Abbey =

Church building in Mosbach, Karlsruhe Government Region, Baden-Württemberg, Germany

Coordinates: 49°21′08″N 9°08′48″E

Mosbach Abbey (Kloster Mosbach) was a Benedictine monastery, later a monastery of Augustinian Canons, in the town of Mosbach in the Odenwald, Baden-Württemberg, Germany.

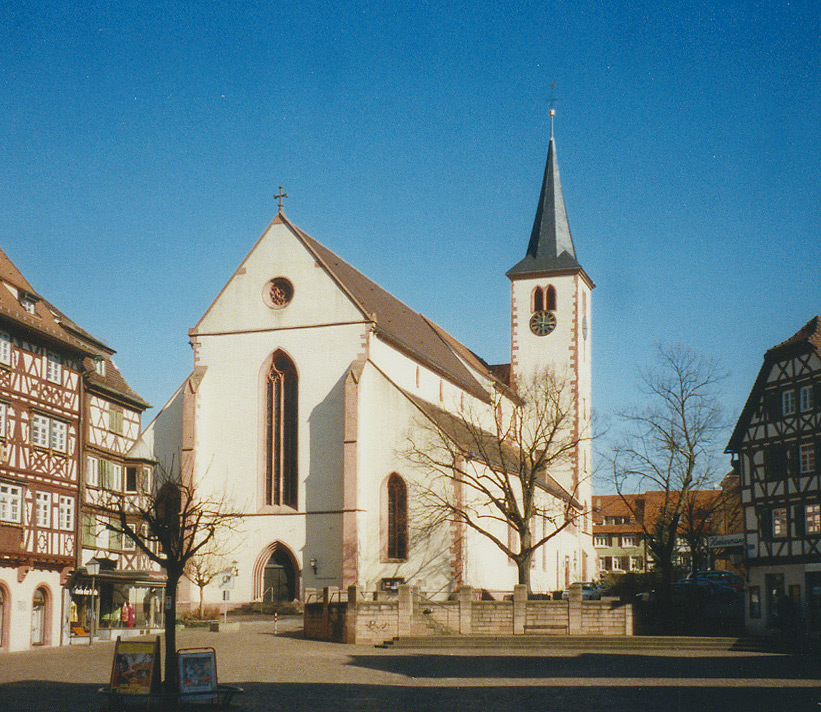

== History ==
As part of the systematic Carolingian Christianisation of this part of Germany, a number of monasteries were set up, covering between them the whole region of the Odenwald: Amorbach, Lorsch and Fulda, all founded in the 8th century, and Mosbach, the southernmost and least documented. It is first mentioned in a reference in the records of Reichenau Abbey in 825, but in the context of the other monastic foundations in the Odenwald, it seems likely that it was also founded in the previous century. The next record of it is in 976, when Emperor Otto II granted it to Worms Cathedral chapter as a private episcopal monastery. In about 1000, it was changed from a Benedictine house to one of canons regular. In 1268 however the abbey regained its independence with the re-grant of the right to elect its own abbots.

In 1308 the present Saint Juliana's church was built to replace the earlier abbey church. In 1556 in the course of the Reformation the Elector Palatine Otto-Heinrich abolished Roman Catholic services and made the abbey church the town's Protestant parish church. The former Catholic parish church of Saint Cecilia's was thus rendered superfluous and was demolished. Otto-Heinrich dissolved the abbey itself in 1564, of which virtually nothing remains except the church.

During the course of the 17th century the need for a Catholic church re-emerged, however, and in 1707 Saint Juliana's was partitioned to allow both Protestants and Catholics to use the same building for worship as a simultaneum: the Protestants have the former nave and the Catholics the former chancel. Their congregations form part of the Roman Catholic Archdiocese of Freiburg and the United Protestant Church in Baden, respectively. In 2007, on the 300th anniversary of the separation, Protestant and Catholic parishes agreed to open the separation wall. The wall was pierced and gates and a few steps were built, which now connect the Protestant and Catholic sides.

== Mosbach Friary ==
In 1688 a community of Franciscans settled here and established a friary on a new site further out of the town centre. The friary was dissolved in 1808 during the secularisation in Baden, and the buildings were reused for administrative and local government purposes. The friary garden however has recently been re-developed as a herb garden, in connection with the local Herb Market.
