= Adalbert of Metz (died 841) =

Frankish nobleman

Adalbert (Note: Spelling variants found in the Latin documents include Adalbertus, Adhelbertus and Adalberhtus.) (died 13 May 841) was a Frankish nobleman with lands scattered throughout the Carolingian Empire. He was one of the most trusted advisors of Emperor Louis the Pious. By 838, he was the count of Metz. He was strongly opposed to the ambition of the emperor's son, Louis the German, for a large kingdom in East Francia. After the elder Louis's death, he supported Emperor Lothar I and it was in the latter's service that he was killed in battle with Louis the German.

== Early life ==
Adalbert was a Hattonian. His brothers were Banzleib and Hatto. The family's lands were spread throughout the empire in Le Mans, Metz, Nassau, Toulouse, Alemannia, Saxony and the Wormsgau.

Adalbert is first recorded as the seneschal of Louis the Pious on 8 November 816, when he was sent as a missus dominicus (royal envoy) to hear a complaint from the abbey of Prüm against the alienation of a part of its forest by the serfs of the fisc at Thommen. In 825, he is mentioned with the title of count when again acting as a missus, this time in the legatio of Trier alongside the city's archbishop, Hetti.

Adalbert's prestige and influence increased rapidly the mid-830s. On 20 November 834 Louis transformed his benefices in the Wormsgau and at a place called Cunigessunteri near Mainz into allods. That same month, he attended the imperial assembly at Attigny. He is recorded as one of Louis's fideles.

It may be that Adalbert founded the monastery of Lindau, but the evidence is weak. According to its own necrology, the monastery was founded by a person called Adalbert. (Note: He is called stifter dis munsters. The Translatio sanguinis Domini also associates an Adalbert with Lindau.) There is a false diploma of Louis the Pious that refers to the founder as Adalbert, "our faithful vassal and count of the sacred palace". The name, description and time are consistent.

== Count and counsellor of Louis the Pious ==
In 835, the emperor sent Adalbert to the abbey of Fulda to ensure that the imprisoned former archbishop Ebbo of Reims would be placed under greater security, since an attempt to free him was expected. In 836, the emperor, calling him "our faithful vassal", rewarded him with the villa Fontanas in the pagus of Toulouse.

By the late 830s, Adalbert was imperial doorkeeper. The contemporary historian Nithard portrays him as one of the emperor's leading counsellors who set the emperor against his namesake son, Louis the German. According to Nithard, Adalbert and his ally, Archbishop Otgar of Mainz, so hated Louis that they wished him dead. Although Nithard is heavily biased against Adalbert, the Annales Fuldenses agree that he was the "instigator of the disputes" between Louis the Pious and Louis the German. The probable reason for this was strong opposition to the creation of a kingdom of East Francia that would have turned the Rhine into a border, since the Hattonians held lands on both sides of the river.

By 838, Adalbert was count of Metz, a title first recorded by Nithard. In an imperial charter of 17 April 838, he is called consiliarius (counsellor), a common term for him in the chronicles but rare in the imperial chancery. This is the only known document that uses it. In it, Louis restores a villa (Note: The villa is called Bonalla in region called the pagus Carmicense.) that Adalbert held in benefice from the emperor, to the cathedral of Le Mans, on the advice of Adalbert, "our counsellor and count".

== Rebellions of Louis the German ==
Adalbert attended the assembly at Nijmegen in June 838, when Louis the Pious made his eldest son, Lothar I, guardian of his younges, Charles the Bald. The assembly otherwise dealt primarily with the Viking threat. He was the first layman to sign as a witness the charter issued there by Louis to the abbey of Fulda on 14 June, indicating his preeminent status.

Adalber attended Charles's coronation as king of Neustria in September 838, where it was also announced that Louis the German's kingdom would be limited to Bavaria. In response to this, Louis the German entered into open rebellion. When the emperor crossed the Rhine with 3,000 men in early 839, Adalbert rallied the Saxons "partly by threats, partly by persuasion", according to the Annales Fuldenses. In this he was probably helped by Banzleib, who was margrave of Saxony. For his role in putting down Louis's rebellion, the emperor rewarded him with grants of land in Alemannia.

In January 840, the emperor, then in Aquitaine, ordered Adalbert and Bishop Drogo of Metz to defend the Rhine and prevent Louis the German from crossing until he could arrive in force.

== Civil war and death ==
Around the time of Louis the Pious's death in June 840, Adalbert fell ill. According to Nithard, he remained ill for "almost an entire year". On 8 August, calling himself a "humble servant of Christ", Adalbert granted lands at Walluf and Koblenz to the abbey of Fulda "for my immeasurable sins and crimes". The charter, drawn up at Walluf, was still dated by the reign of the deceased emperor.

In the civil war between his sons that followed the emperor's death, Adalbert sided with Lothar. He was an inveterate enemy of Louis the German, who always blamed his father's counsellors, especially Adalbert, for his exclusion from the division of the empire (except Bavaria). Adalbert was the most important of Lothar's advisors. According to Nithard: "at that time Adalbert was so skilled in counsel that no one dared question a thing he said. At his instigation, Lothar gathered an infinite multitude and set out for the Rhine" in early 841. When Louis retreated to Bavaria, Lothar left Adalbert in charge east of the Rhine with the title, according to Nithard, of dux Austrasiorum ("commander of the Austrasians").

In May 841, Louis broke out of Bavaria by luring Adalbert's larger army into the Ries. On 13 May, he defeated him in a major battle on the banks of the Wörnitz. Adalbert was killed in action. His death was noted by many chronicles.

== Bibliography ==
- Depreux, Philippe (1997). Prosopographie de l'entourage de Louis le Pieux (781–840) (PDF). Sigmaringen: Jan Thorbecke.
- Goldberg, Eric J. (2006). Struggle for Empire: Kingship and Conflict under Louis the German, 817–876. Cornell University Press.
