= Lüne =

Lüne (Latin: Hliuni) was a location on the left bank of the lower Elbe, known in connection with the Saxon war of 795. It was a village near Lüneburg.

The Frankish king Charlemagne, intending to campaign against the Avars, summoned Saxon troops. Some Transelbean Saxons refused to heed the summons and Charlemagne marched into Saxony, encamping at Lüne while waiting for his Obodrite allies to join him. Some Saxons ambushed the Obodrite king Witzan as he was crossing the Elbe, killing him. A campaign of devastation was then waged against Saxony, culminating in the taking of hostages. This marks the beginning of a new phase in the Saxon wars, marked by economic devastation and deportations. While Charlemagne was still at Lüne, he was visited by envoys of the tudun of the Avar khaganate. According to the Royal Frankish Annals for 795:

In this year the king came to Kostheim, a suburb of the city of Mainz, and there he held an assembly. When he heard that the Saxons had, as usual, broken their promise to accept Christianity and keep faith with the king, he entered Saxony with an army and reached the Elbe at Lüne. [After he arrived in the Bardengau he pitched camp near the place called Bardowick to await the arrival of the Slavs, whom he had commanded to come to him.] At that time, Witzin, the king of the Obodrites, was slain there by the Saxons. [This event further persuaded the king to beat down the Saxons promptly and made him hate the treacherous people even more.]

To Saxony also came emissaries of the tudun, who possessed much power among the people and in the kingdom of the Avars. They declared that this tudun wished, with his land and people, to submit to the king and on his instruction accept the Christian faith. Once the Saxons had been soundly beaten, their country laid waste, and their hostages received, the king returned to Gaul and celebrated Christmas and Easter at the palace of Aachen.

According to the Annals of Lorsch, which do not name the place on the Elbe:

Unfaithfulness arose—from where it habitually did—on the part of the Saxons. When the king wanted to campaign against other gentes they did not join him in full strength, nor did they send him the support he had ordered. Then, after he had realised their faithlessness yet again, the king marched against them with his army. Some from the Saxon side came to meet him and completed their campaign with him, giving their support, and he and his army reached the Elbe. But others around the marshes of the Elbe and in Wihmodia did not come in the full numbers promised.

Then all came to him, except those just-mentioned and those living across the Elbe: they had not come in full numbers up until now, because they had killed King Witzan of the Abodrites who had been Charles's man and did not think they would be able to return to Charles's grace. The others all came peacefully, promising to obey his orders, and so the lord king trusted in them again, and did not put any of them to death deliberately, so as to retain their trust.

According to Hervé Pinoteau, Counts Heimo and Sigfred were killed at the "battle of Lüne on the Elbe" on 5 May 795.

== Bibliography ==
- Collins, Roger (1998). Charlemagne. Macmillan. doi:10.1007/978-1-349-26924-2. ISBN 978-1-350-36252-9.
- Hen, Yitzhak (2006). "Charlemagne's Jihad". Viator. 37: 33–51. doi:10.1484/j.viator.2.3017477.
- McKitterick, Rosamond (2008). Charlemagne: The Formation of a European Identity. Cambridge University Press. doi:10.1017/CBO9780511803314. ISBN 978-0-521-71645-1.
- Mombert, Jacob Isidor (1888). A History of Charles the Great (Charlemagne). D. Appleton & Co.
- Nelson, Janet L. (2019). King and Emperor: A New Life of Charlemagne. Penguin.
- Pinoteau, Hervé (1982). Vingt-cinq ans d'études dynastiques. Editions Christian.
- Pohl, Walter (2018). The Avars: A Steppe Empire in Central Europe, 567–822. Cornell University Press.
- Scholz, Bernhard Walter (1970). Carolingian Chronicles: Royal Frankish Annals and Nithard's Histories. University of Michigan Press. ISBN 978-0-472-08790-7.
