= Hattonids =

The Hattonids were an important imperial noble family in the first half of the 9th century, during the reigns of the Carolingian kings Charlemagne and Louis the Pious. They lost their position under Louis the German. They were patronised by the emperors and were enfeoffed with benefices on imperial estates. They attended empire-wide councils and were given military commands on the borders to defend the empire from Danish Vikings and Slavs.

Hailing from Saxony and Bavaria, where they had many lands and honores, the Hattonids were appointed to prefectures and counties in East Franconia and the central Rhineland from an early date.

One of their family, Banzleib, was both Count of Maine in 832 and, by 838, comes et Saxoniae patriae marchio ("count and margrave of the Saxon fatherland") under Louis the Pious. The Hattonids more or less controlled Saxony in the last years of Louis the Pious' reign.

The Hattonids were staunch supporters of Louis the Pious and the unity of the Frankish Empire. After Louis's death in 840, Banzleib and his brothers, Adalbert, Count of Metz, and Hatto, Count of Nassau, supported Lothair in the subsequent civil war which arose between Louis's sons and opposed Louis the German and the creation of an East Frankish kingdom.

On 14 December 840 at Rösebeck, Louis dispossessed Banzleib of his benefices and public offices and granted them to Warin, Abbot of Corvey. In the Battle of Wörnitz (13 May 841), Adalbert, Count of Metz and possibly also Banzleib fell. Their brother Hatto lost his county of Nassau, too, but he maintained his possessions in Alemannia until at least 857.

== Stammliste ==
1. NN
  1. Hatto (Ato, Uto), 831-841 Count of Nassau, 831-854/857 Count in Alemannia
    1. Lambert, Abbot of the Schienen monastery (Öhningen)
  2. Banzleib, 832 Count of Maine, 838 Count and Margrave in Saxony
  3. Adalbert (d. 841), 825 attested, Count of Metz, dux Austrasiorum, fell in the Battle of Wörnitz
  4. ? daughter, married to Poppo I., Count in the Grabfeld

== Sources ==
- Lexikon des Mittelalters: Seite 104.
- Gerd Althoff: Über die von Erzbischof Liutbert auf die Reichenau übersandten Namen. in: Frühmittelalterliche Studien Bd. 14 (1980) S. 219–242, hier S. 233–235 u. 237–239 PDF
- Michael Borgolte: Die Grafen Alemanniens., 1986, S. 60–62
- Alfred Friese: Studien zur Herrschaftsgeschichte des fränkischen Adels. Der mainländisch-thüringische Raum vom 7. bis 11. Jahrhundert. 1979
- Goldberg, Eric J. "Popular Revolt, Dynastic Politics, and Aristocratic Factionalism in the Early Middle Ages: The Saxon Stellinga Reconsidered." Speculum, Vol. 70, No. 3. (Jul., 1995), pp 467–501.
- Donald C. Jackman: Die Ahnentafeln der frühesten deutschen Könige. In: Herold-Jahrbuch. Neue Folge, 15. Band, 2010, S. 47ff
- Walther Kienast: Die fränkische Vasallität von den Hausmeiern bis zu Ludwig dem Kind und Karl dem Einfältigen. 1990
- Karl Schmidt: Kloster Schienen. S. 282–303
