= Poppo, Duke of Thuringia =

German nobleman and Duke of Thuringia from 880 to 892

Poppo II or Boppo II (died after 906) was the Duke of Thuringia from 880 until his deposition in 892.

Poppo, a Popponid (Elder House of Babenberg), was the younger brother of Henry of Franconia. They also had a younger brother named Egino. All three may have been the sons or grandsons of Poppo I of Grapfeld.

Poppo replaced Radulf II in the Sorbian March no later than 880. In that year, the Daleminzi, Bohemians, and Sorbs threatened to invade Thuringia and burn the German-allied Slav districts. Poppo's subsequent expedition against them is recorded in three different variations in the three different manuscript traditions of the Annales Fuldenses. He may or may not have led the Thuringii in this campaign, but he was certainly victorious.

The reasons behind Poppo's battles in 882, 883, and 884 are unknown. In the previous year, he and the Thuringii had been defeated under Egino in a war that they had instigated with Saxons In 883, he again fought his brother Egino, who was recorded as a co-duke of the Thuringii, and was defeated savagely and forced to retreat with only a few men.

Poppo was deprived of his offices and titles in 892. According to Regino of Prüm, Poppo had advised Arn, Bishop of Würzburg, to undertake the expedition against the Slavs on which he was killed earlier that year. Because Poppo was replaced in Thuringia by Conrad and Arn was replaced by Rudolf, both Conradines, it has been supposed that King Arnulf was merely patronising one family over another: the Conradines and Babenbergers were feuding shortly afterwards. On the other hand, Poppo may have been punished for the ill-advised campaign of Arn. He was restored to his lands in 899 and made Count of the Bavarian Nordgau in 903. He was Count of the Volkfeld in 906. He died sometime after.

== Sources ==
- Reuter, Timothy. Germany in the Early Middle Ages 800–1056. New York: Longman, 1991.
- Reuter, Timothy (trans.) The Annals of Fulda. (Manchester Medieval series, Ninth-Century Histories, Volume II.) Manchester: Manchester University Press, 1992.
