= Egino, Duke of Thuringia =

Egino (died 3 August 908) was a count in East Franconia and Duke of Thuringia in the late 9th century. He was a Popponid (Elder House Babenberg), the younger brother of Henry of Franconia and Poppo of Thuringia. All three may have been sons or grandsons of Poppo of Grapfeld.

Egino feuded with his brother Poppo in Thuringia in 882 and 883, but the reasons are unknown. In 882, he and the Saxons had instigated a war with Poppo and the Thuringii and vanquished them. In 883, he was recorded as a co-duke of the Thuringii, and savagely defeated his brother, forcing him to retreat with but a small remnant of his original fighting force.

While a necrology of Fulda records Egino's death in 886, he was mentioned in charters as living in 887 and 888. Egino was killed, along with Burchard, Duke of Thuringia, and Rudolf I, Bishop of Würzburg, in battle with the Magyars.

== Sources ==
- Reuter, Timothy. Germany in the Early Middle Ages 800–1056. New York: Longman, 1991.
- Reuter, Timothy (trans.) The Annals of Fulda. (Manchester Medieval series, Ninth-Century Histories, Volume II.) Manchester: Manchester University Press, 1992.
