= Burchard, Duke of Thuringia =

Duke of Thuringia from 892 to 908

Burchard (died 3 August 908) was the Duke of Thuringia (and the Sorbian March) from shortly after 892 until his death. He replaced Poppo as duke shortly after his appointment in 892, but the reasons for Poppo's leaving office are unknown. Burchard may have been a Swabian.

In 908 he led a large army in battle against the Magyars. In Saxony on 3 August, he fought a pitched battle at Eisenach, was defeated, and died, along with Rudolf I, Bishop of Würzburg, and Count Egino.

After Burchard, no further dukes of the Thuringii are recorded, but they remained a distinct people, eventually forming a landgraviate in the High Middle Ages.

Burchard left two sons, Burchard and Bardo, who were expelled from Thuringia by Henry the Fowler in 913.
