= Rudolf I (bishop of Würzburg) =

Bishop of Würzburg

Rudolf I (died 3 August 908) was the Bishop of Würzburg from 892 until his death. He was the youngest son of Udo of Neustria.

In 892, he was appointed as bishop to replace Arno, who was killed during a campaign against Great Moravia. At the same time, his brother Conrad the Elder became Margrave of Thuringia, reflecting the influence the family held within East Francia. It is probable that Arnulf switched his patronage from one family to another, because Poppo, Duke of Thuringia, a Babenberg, was deposed for counselling Arno to campaign. Soon after the Babenbergs and Conradines were in a feud.

Rudolf was killed in 908 while fighting against the Magyars in Thuringia.

== Sources ==
- Reuter, Timothy (trans.) The Annals of Fulda. (Manchester Medieval series, Ninth-Century Histories, Volume II.) Manchester: Manchester University Press, 1992.
