= Hungarian invasions of Europe =

Series of conflicts between Hungary and other European powers

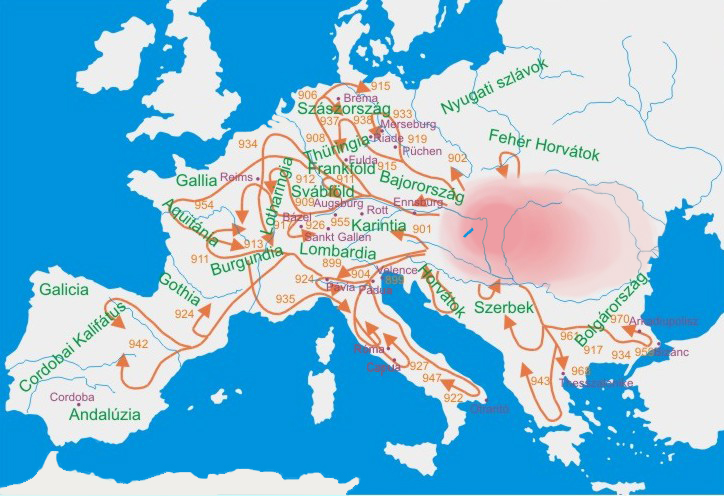
- Hungarian campaigns in the 9–10th century
Date	c. 800/839–970
Location	Western Europe, Eastern Europe, Balkans, and Iberian Peninsula
Result	Between 899 and 970, the researchers count 47 (38 to West and 9 to East) campaigns in different parts of Europe. (8 were unsuccessful, the others ended with success).; European rulers paid tribute to the Hungarians and hired Hungarian warriors.; The Hungarian victory at the Battle of Pressburg (907) secured the Hungarian state in the Carpathian Basin and deterred German invasions until 1030.; Hungarian pre-emptive campaigns against the German unification culminated in the Battle of Lechfeld (955), after which Hungarian incursions into Germany ceased and the Holy Roman Empire became established.

Belligerents
Hungarian tribes Principality of Hungary	Kingdom of Italy; East Francia; Middle Francia; Great Moravia; Byzantine Empire; Catalan Counties; Upper March of Al-Andalus; First Bulgarian Empire; Khazaria; West Francia; Lower Pannonia; Principality of Littoral Croatia; Kingdom of Croatia; Principality of Serbia; Duchy of Carinthia

Commanders and leaders
Árpád; Bogát; Dursac; Szalárd; Bulcsú; Lehel; Súr; Kisa; Apor; Taksony	Berengar I of Italy; Louis the Child; Luitpold, Margrave of Bavaria; Arnulf, Duke of Bavaria; Henry the Fowler; Otto the Great; Conrad, Duke of Lorraine; Muncimir of Croatia; Tomislav of Croatia; Časlav of Serbia; Abd al-Rahman III; Boris I of Bulgaria; Simeon I of Bulgaria; Bardas Skleros; Peter

Strength
c. 25,000 warriors maximum (but variable)	c. 40,000 (variable)

Casualties and losses
Mostly not significant	Mostly heavy. Some villages and cities burned.

The Hungarian invasions of Europe (Hungarian: kalandozások, German: Ungarneinfälle) occurred in the 9th and 10th centuries, during the period of transition in the history of Europe of the Early Middle Ages, when the territory of the former Carolingian Empire was threatened by invasion by the Magyars (Hungarians) from the east, the Viking expansion from the north, and the Arabs from the south.

The Hungarians took possession of the Carpathian Basin (corresponding to the later Kingdom of Hungary) in a planned manner, with a long period of settlement between 862 and 895, and launched a number of campaigns both westward into former Francia and southward into the Byzantine Empire. The westward raids were stopped only with the Magyar defeat at the Battle of Lechfeld in 955, which led to the revival of the Holy Roman Empire in 962, producing a new political order in Western Europe. The raids into Byzantine territories continued throughout the 10th century until the eventual Christianisation of the Magyars and the establishment of the Christian Kingdom of Hungary in 1000.

== History ==
=== Before the conquest of Hungary (9th century) ===
The first supposed reference to the Hungarians in war is in the 9th century: in 811, the Hungarians (Magyars) were in alliance with Krum of Bulgaria against Emperor Nikephoros I possibly at the Battle of Pliska in the Haemus Mountains (Balkan Mountains). Georgius Monachus' work mentions that around 837 the Bulgarian Empire sought an alliance with the Hungarians. Constantine Porphyrogenitus wrote in his work On Administering the Empire that the Khagan and the Bek of the Khazars asked the Emperor Theophilos to have the fortress of Sarkel built for them. This record is thought to refer to the Hungarians on the basis that the new fortress must have become necessary because of the appearance of a new enemy of the Khazars, and no other people could have been the Khazars’ enemy at that time. In the 10th century, Ahmad ibn Rustah wrote that "earlier, the Khazars entrenched themselves against the attacks of the Magyars and other peoples".

In 860–861, Hungarians attacked Saint Cyril's convoy, but the meeting is said to have ended peacefully. (Saint Cyril was traveling to the Khagan at (or near) Chersonesos Taurica, which had been captured by the Khazars.)

Muslim geographers recorded that the Magyars regularly attacked the neighboring East Slavic tribes in this period, and took captives to sell to the Byzantine Empire at Kerch. There are descriptions of Hungarian raids into the eastern Carolingian Empire in 862.

In 881, the Hungarians and the Kabars invaded East Francia and fought two battles, the former (Ungari) at Wenia (probably Vienna) and the latter (Cowari) at Culmite (possibly Kulmberg or Kollmitz in Austria). In 892, according to the Annales Fuldenses, King Arnulf of East Francia invaded Great Moravia, and the Magyars joined his troops. After 893, Magyar warriors were conveyed across the Danube by the Byzantine fleet and defeated the Bulgarians in three battles (at the Danube, Silistra, and Preslav). In 894, the Magyars invaded Pannonia in alliance with King Svatopluk I of Moravia.

=== After the conquest of Hungary (10th century) ===
Around 896, probably under the leadership of Árpád, the Hungarians (Magyars) crossed the Carpathians and entered the Carpathian Basin (the plains of Hungary, approximately).

In 899, these Magyars defeated Berengar's army in the Battle of Brenta River and invaded the northern regions of Italy. They pillaged the countryside around Treviso, Vicenza, Verona, Brescia, Bergamo and Milan, defeating Braslav, Duke of Lower Pannonia. In 901, they attacked Italy again. In 902, they led a campaign against northern Moravia and defeated the Moravians, whose country was annihilated. In almost every year of the 10th century, they conducted raids against the Catholic west and Byzantine east. However, in 905, the Magyars and King Berengar formed an amicitia, and fifteen years passed without Hungarian troops entering Italy.

The Magyars defeated three large Frankish imperial armies between 907 and 910, as follows. In 907 they defeated the invading Bavarians near Brezalauspurc, destroying their army, successfully defending Hungary and laying Great Moravia, Germany, France and Italy open to Magyar raids. On 3 August 908 the Hungarians won the Battle of Eisenach in Thuringia; Egino, Duke of Thuringia was killed in this battle, along with Burchard, Duke of Thuringia, and Rudolf I, Bishop of Würzburg. Finally, the Magyars defeated Louis the Child's united Frankish imperial army at the first Battle of Lechfeld in 910.

Smaller groups of Magyars penetrated as far as Bremen in 915. In 919, after the death of Conrad I of Germany, the Magyars raided Saxony, Lotharingia, and West Francia. In 921, they defeated King Berengar's enemies at Verona and reached Apulia in 922. Between 917 and 925, the Magyars raided through Basel, Alsace, Burgundy, Provence, and the Pyrenees.

Around 925, according to the Chronicle of the Priest of Dioclea from the late 12th century, Tomislav of Croatia defeated the Magyars in battle; others question the reliability of this account, because there is no proof of this interpretation in other records.

In 926, they ravaged Swabia and Alsace, campaigned through present-day Luxembourg, and reached as far as the Atlantic Ocean. In 927, Peter, brother of Pope John X, called on the Magyars to rule Italy. They marched into Rome and imposed large tribute payments on Tuscany and Tarento. In 933, a substantial Magyar army appeared in Saxony (the pact with the Saxons having expired) but was defeated by Henry I at Merseburg. Magyar attacks continued against Upper Burgundy (in 935) and against Saxony (in 936). In 937, they raided France as far west as Reims, Lotharingia, Swabia, Franconia, the Duchy of Burgundy and Italy as far as Otranto in the south. They attacked Bulgaria and the Byzantine Empire, reaching the walls of Constantinople. The Byzantines paid them a “tax” for 15 years. In 938, the Magyars repeatedly attacked Saxony. In 940, they ravaged the region of Rome. In 942, Hungarian raids on Spain, particularly in Catalonia, took place, according to Ibn Hayyan's work. In 947, Bulcsú, a chieftain of Taksony, led a raid into Italy as far as Apulia, and King Berengar II of Italy had to buy peace by paying a large amount of money to him and his followers.

The Battle of Lechfeld in 955, in which the Magyars lost approximately 5,000 warriors, finally checked their expansion although raids on the Byzantine Empire continued until 970. (Lechfeld is south of Augsburg, in present-day southern Germany.)

Between 899 and 970, according to the contemporary sources, the researchers count 45 (according to Nagy Kálmán) or 47 (according to Szabados György 38 to West and 9 to East) raids in different parts of Europe. From these campaigns only 8 (17.5%) were unsuccessful (901, 913, 933, 943, 948, 951, 955, 970) and 37 ended with success (82.5%).

We ask you, even though we are your humble servants, Lord save us from the arrows of the Hungarians!

— Hymn from Modena, around 900

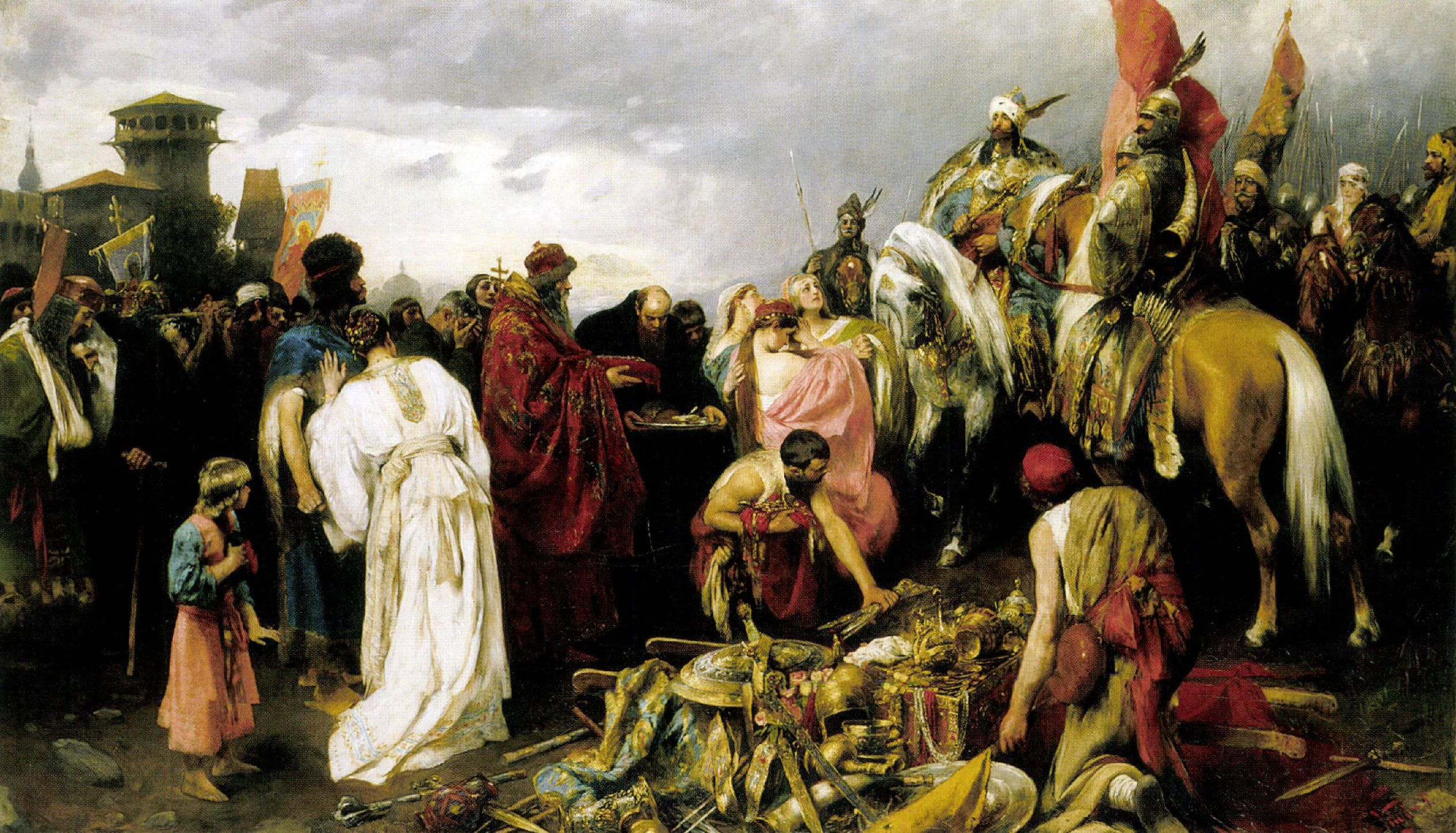
The Hungarians at Kiev (Pál Vágó, 1896–99)

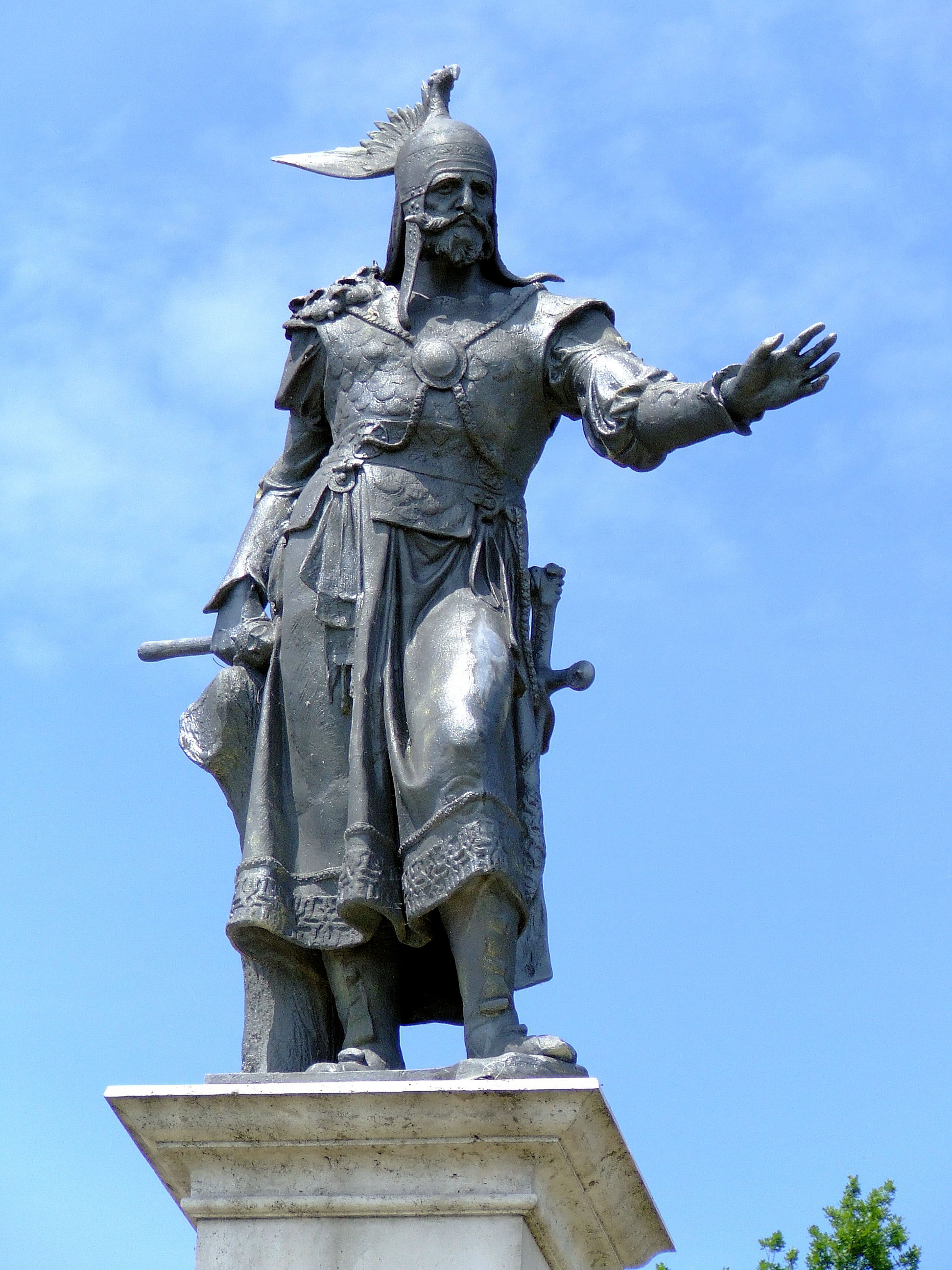
Statue of Árpád at Ráckeve

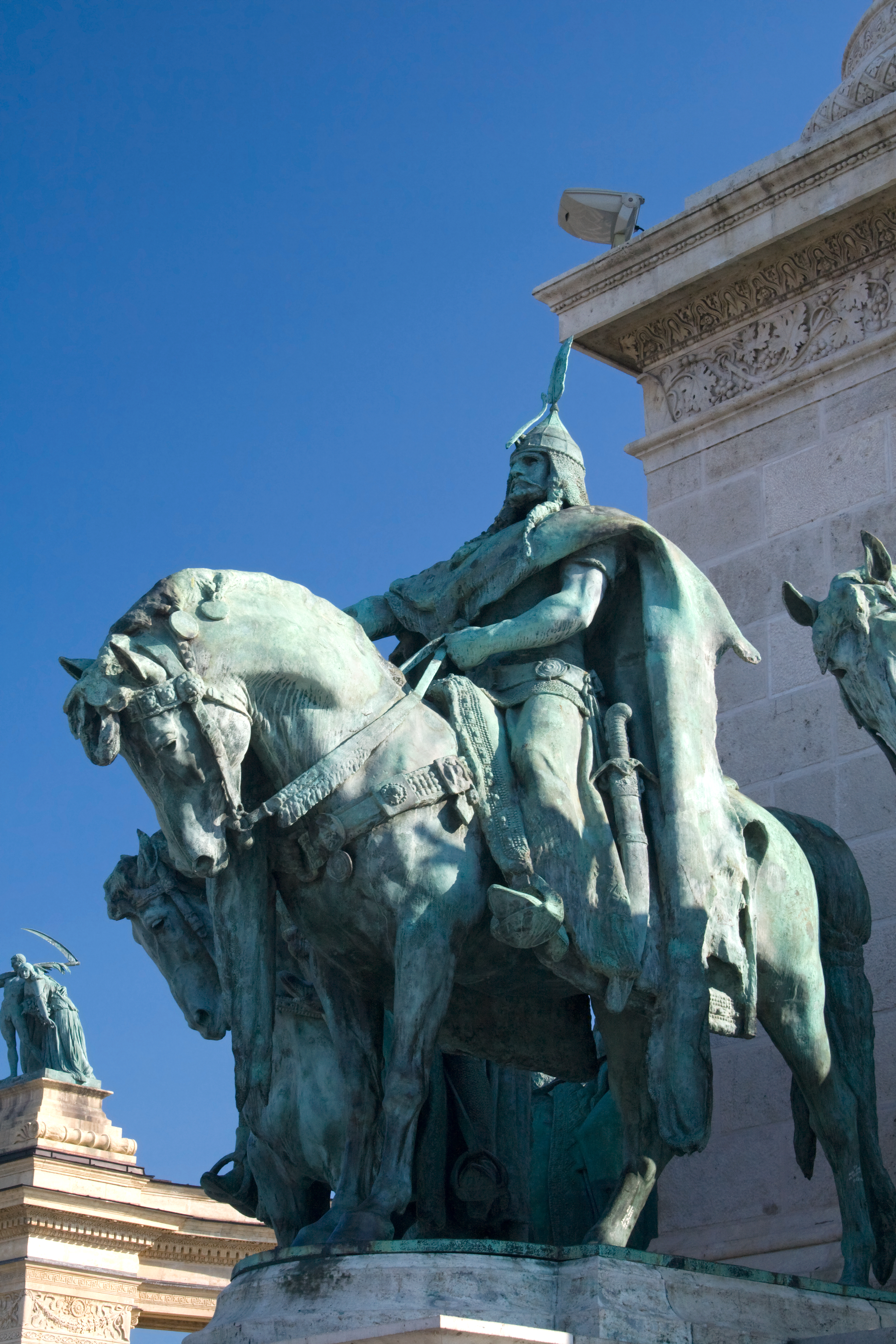
Statue of Árpád at the Heroes' Square in Budapest

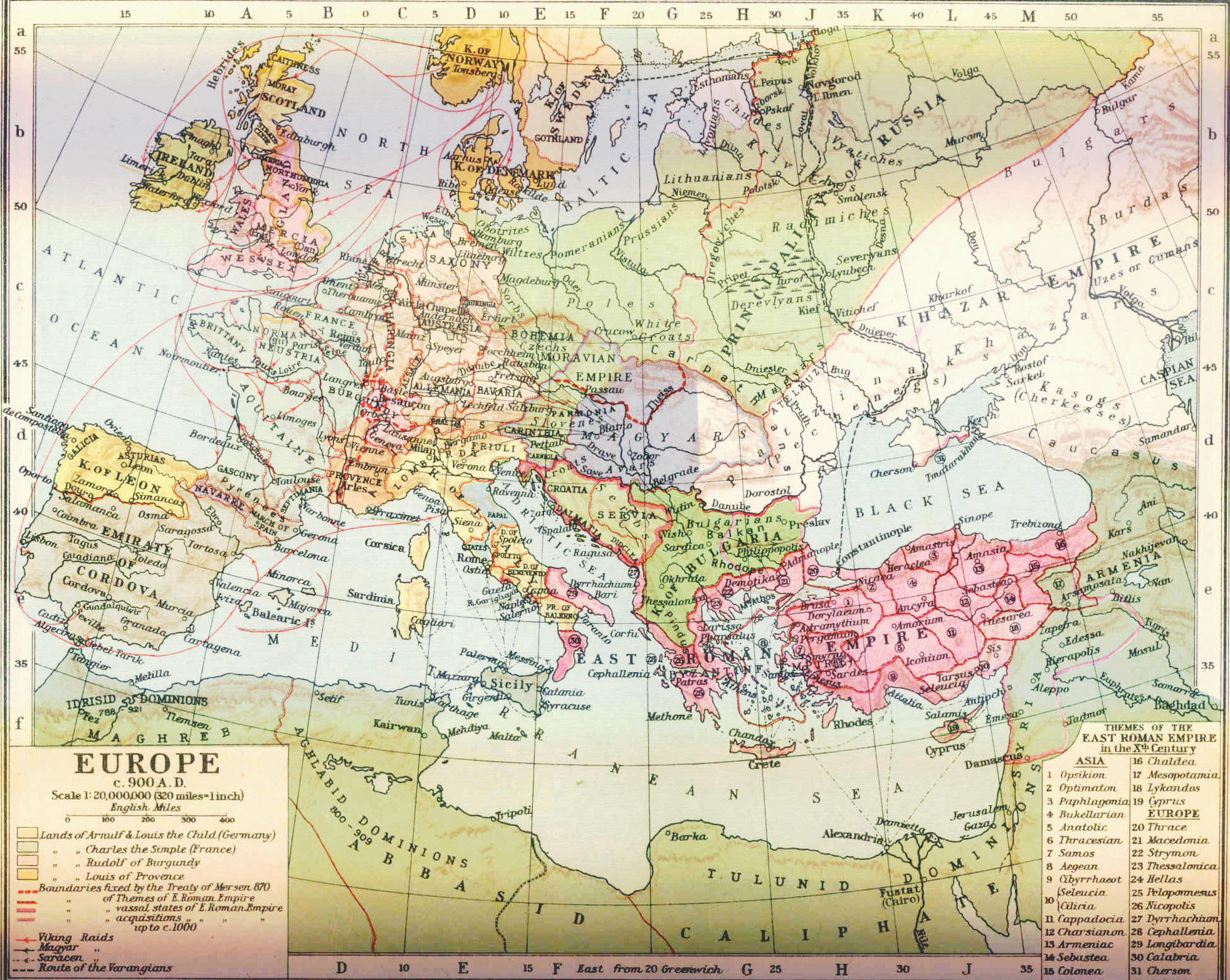
Europe around 900

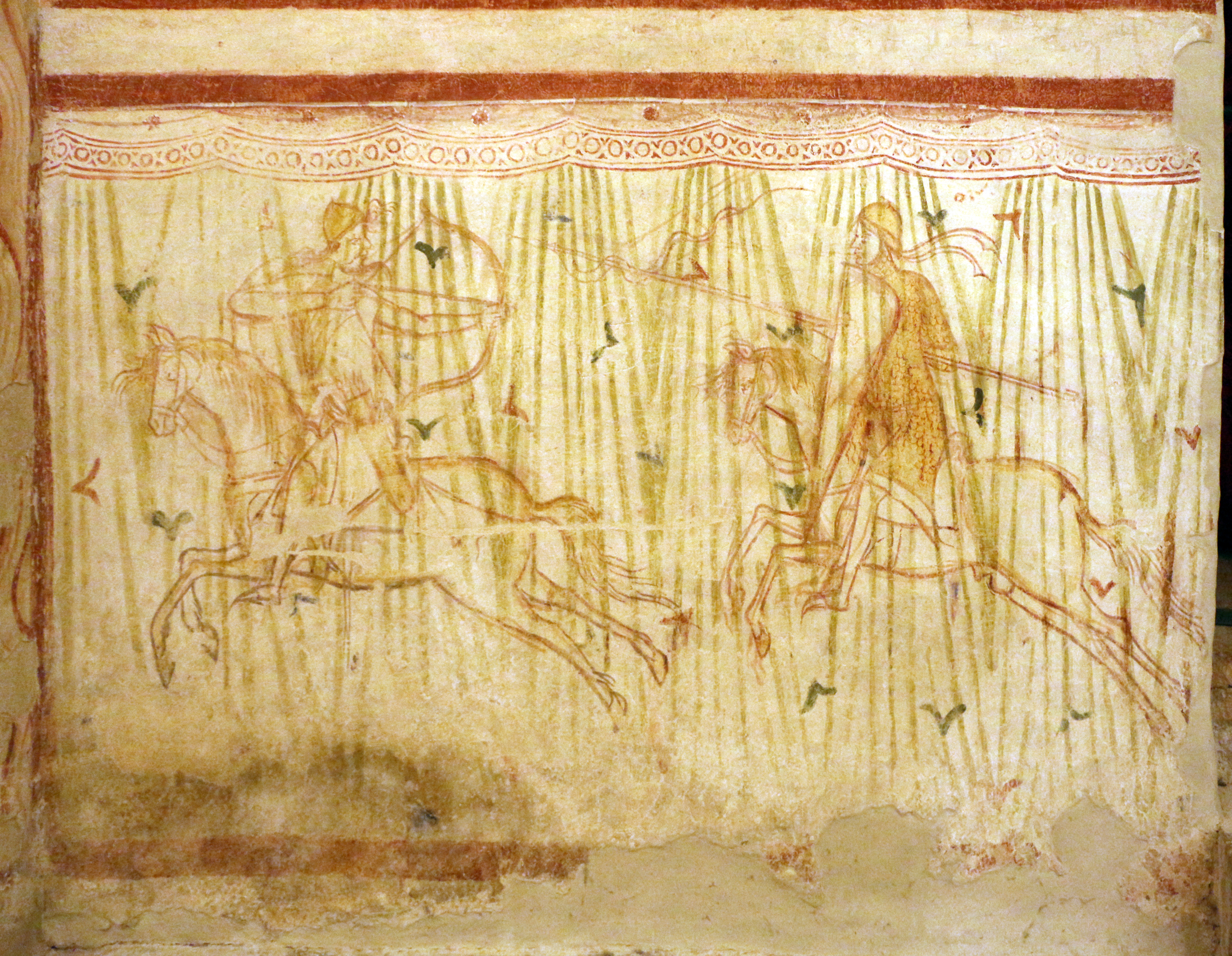
Fresco depicting a Hungarian warrior in the Basilica of Aquilieia, Italy

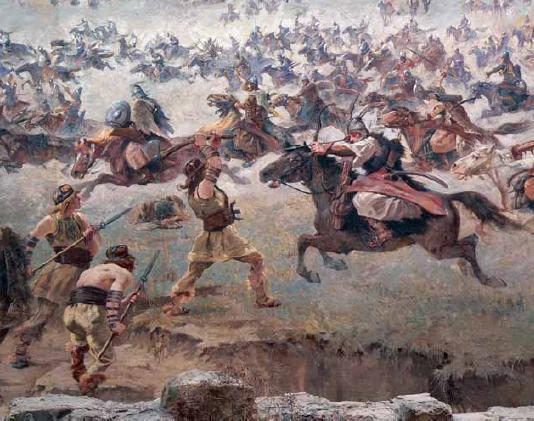
Hungarian warriors, detail of the Feszty Panorama (Árpád Feszty, 1894)

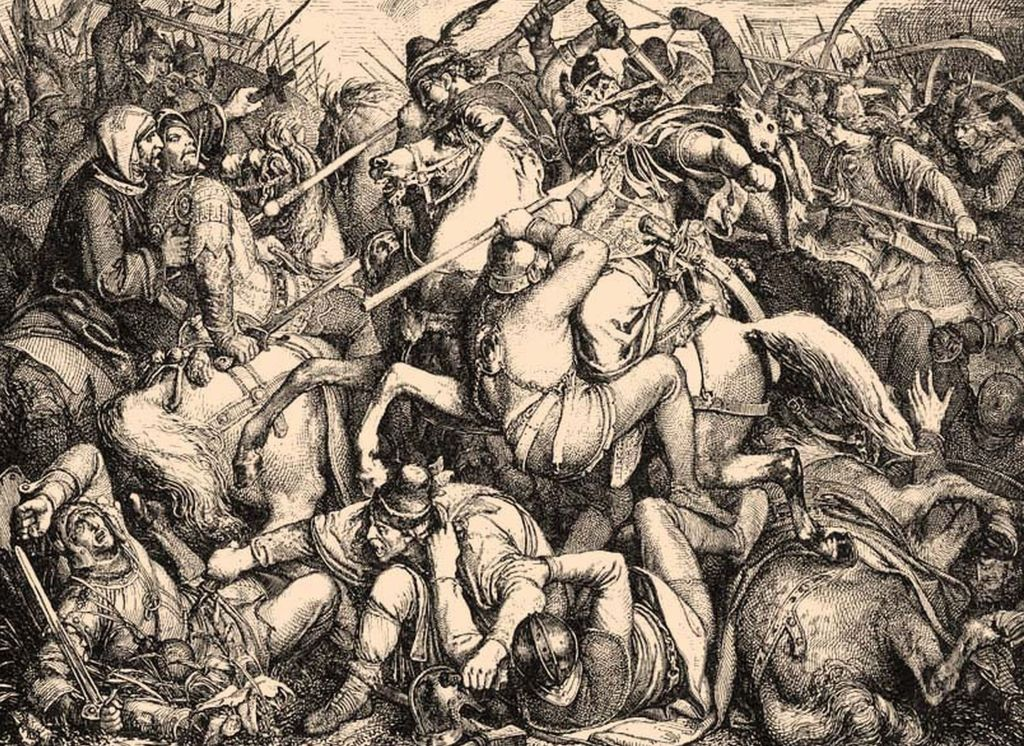
Battle of Pressburg in 907 (Peter Johann Nepomuk Geiger, 1850)

== Timeline of the Hungarian invasions ==
=== Before the Hungarian Conquest ===
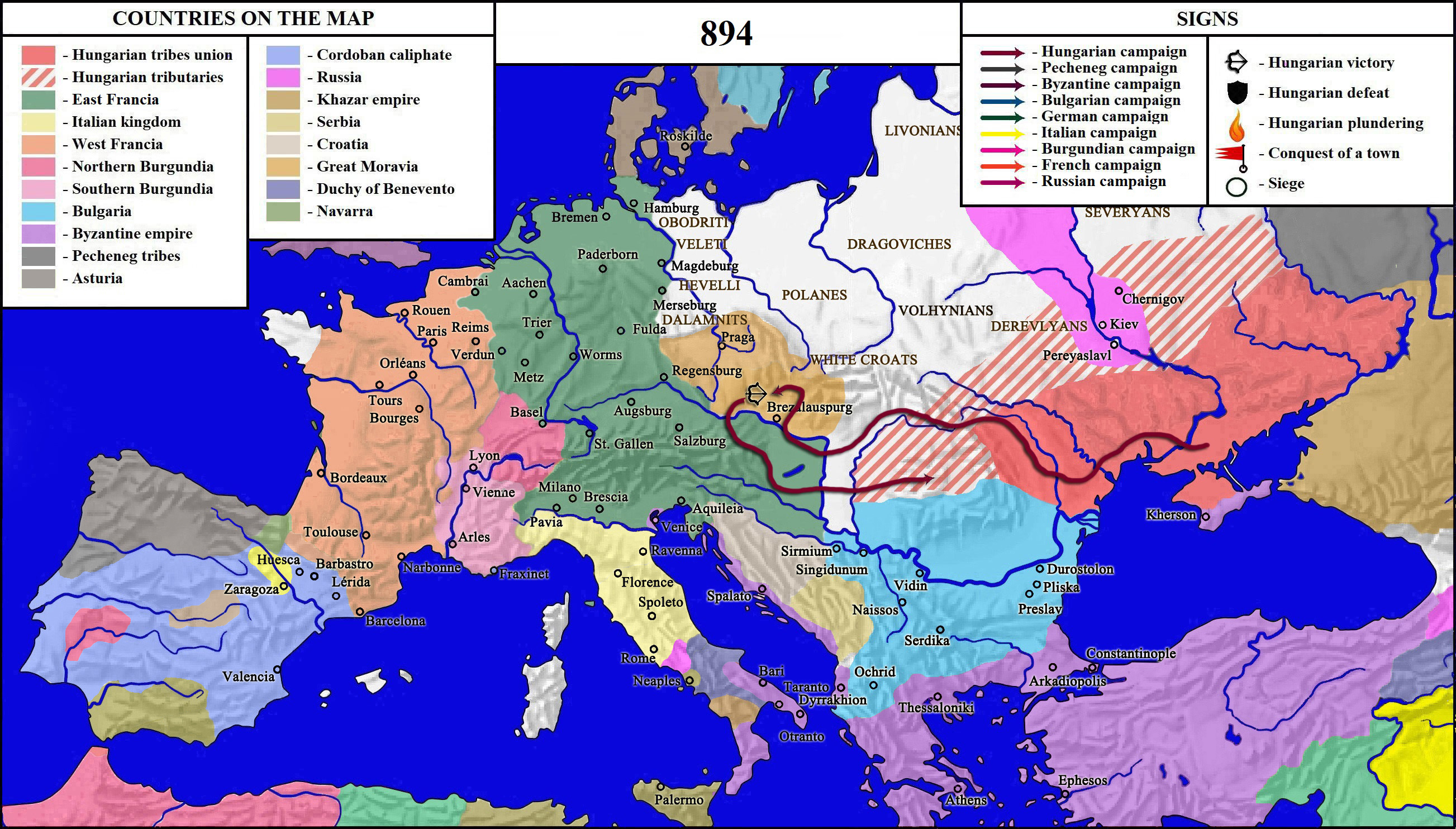
The Hungarian campaign of 894

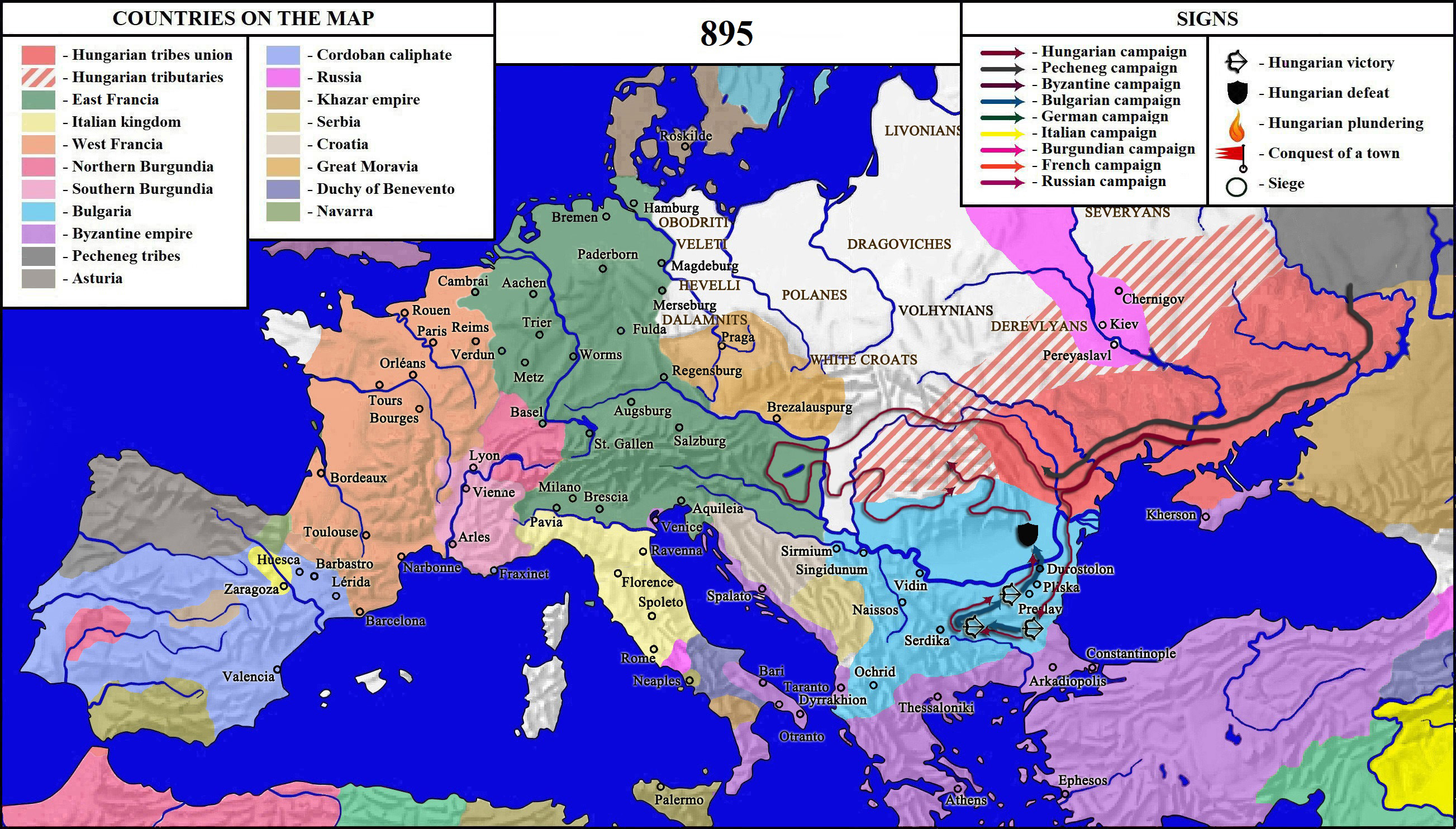
The military events of the Hungarian conquest in 894–895

- 811: The Hungarians were in alliance with Krum of Bulgaria against Emperor Nikephoros I at the Battle of Pliska in the Haemus Mountains (Balkan Mountains).
- 839: The Hungarians, who then lived east of the Carpathians, in Etelköz, fought in the Lower Danube at the request of the First Bulgarian Empire against Byzantine insurgents.
- 861: Saint Cyril was attacked in Crimea by Hungarians "screaming like wolves", but seeing him praying, they became peaceful.
- 862: First raid of the Hungarians in the Carpathian Basin at the request of Rastislav of Moravia against East Francia.
- c. 870: al-Djayhani and Ahmad ibn Rustah wrote that the Hungarian tribes attacked the Slavs who lived near their borders, winning many small battles, and took many of them to Kerch in Crimea to sell to the Byzantines as slaves.
- 881: Hungarian troops, helping the Moravians, fought two battles against the Germans.
- 882: The Hungarian ruler met with Saints Cyril and Methodius on the Lower Danube.
- 892: Hungarian troops attacked Great Moravia in alliance with the East Francian king Arnulf of Carinthia.
- 894
  - In alliance with Svatopluk I of Moravia, the Hungarians attacked the East Francian province of Pannonia. Svatopluk died during this war.
  - The Bulgarians, led by Simeon I of Bulgaria, attacked the Byzantines, who asked for Hungarian help. A Hungarian army, led by Liüntika, defeated the Bulgarian army in three battles (at the Danube, Silistra and Preslav), and forced Simeon to retreat to Silistra.
- 895: Simeon allied with the Pechenegs to attack the Hungarians, forcing them to retreat west towards the Carpathian Basin. The Hungarians then conquered the eastern parts of the Carpathian Basin (those east of the river Danube). Then, the Hungarians defeated the Bulgarians in Southern Transylvania and Tiszántúl, ending their power in the Carpathian Basin.

=== After the Hungarian conquest ===
- 899: The Hungarians attacked the Italian Kingdom, and defeated the army of Berengar I of Italy on 24 September, in the Battle of Brenta, burning Modena, and attacking Venice. Berengar agreed to pay them tribute.

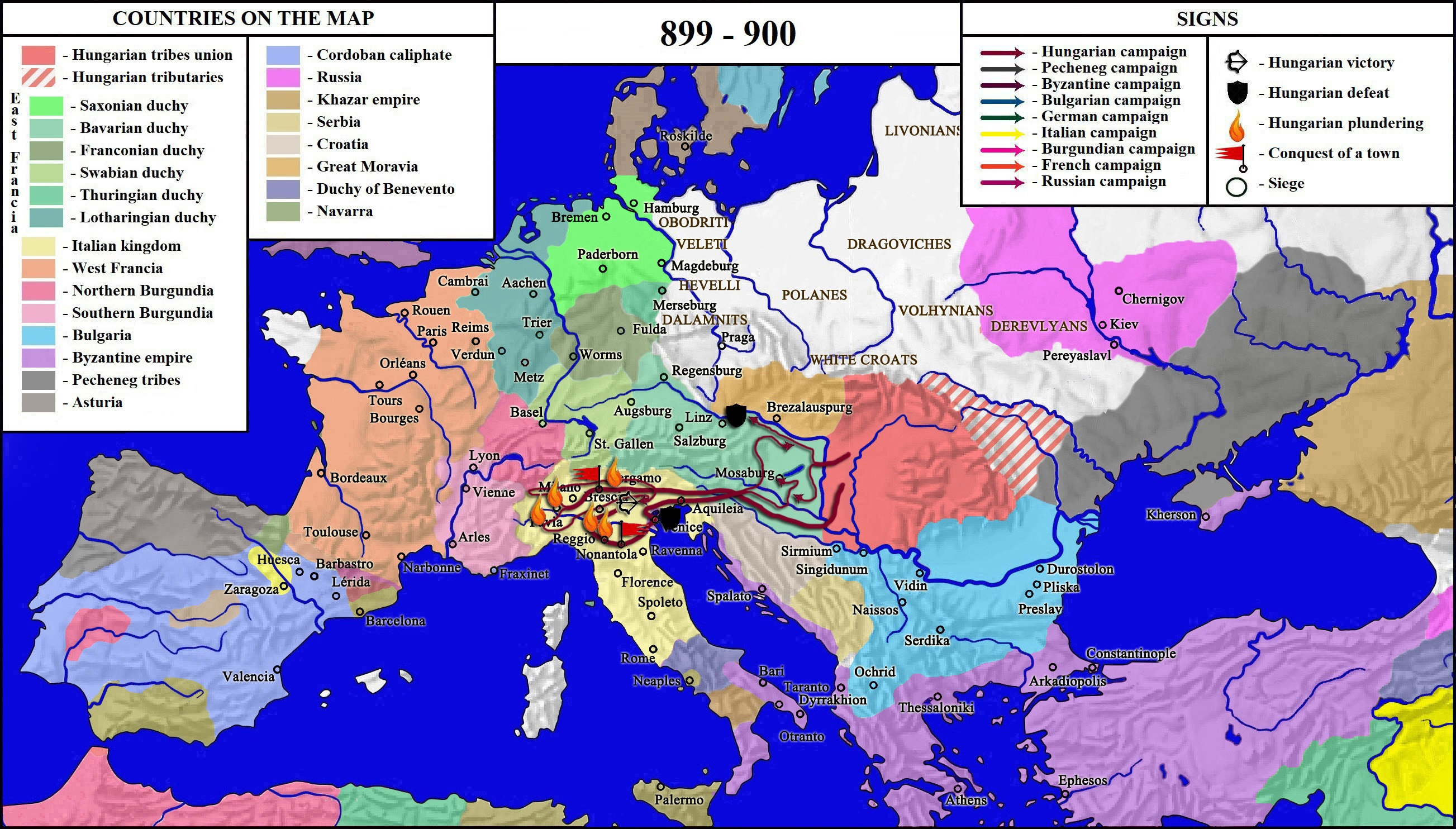
The Hungarian campaign in Italy, with the Battle of Brenta and the campaign that resulted the capture of Dunántúl

- 900: The Hungarians conquered Pannonia, after their proposal of alliance to the East Francians was rejected. This was another step in the Hungarian Conquest.
- 901
  - The Hungarians attacked Carinthia and Northern Italy.
  - April 11 or 18: The Magyar army from Carinthia was defeated by Margrave Ratold at Laibach.
- 902: The Hungarians conquered the eastern parts of Great Moravia, completing the Hungarian Conquest of the Carpathian Basin, and began forcing the Slavs west and north of this region to pay tribute to them.
- 903: A Hungarian force raiding in Bavaria was defeated near the river Fischa.
- 904
  - The Hungarian political and military leader Kurszán (kende, gyula or horka) was invited to a feast and then assassinated by the Bavarians.
  - early summer: Hungarian armies march to Lombardy.
- 905
  - King Berengar of Italy made alliance with the Hungarians against his enemy, Louis of Provence, who had declared himself emperor of Italy.
  - early summer: The Magyars defeat Louis of Provence, who is then blinded by Berengar.

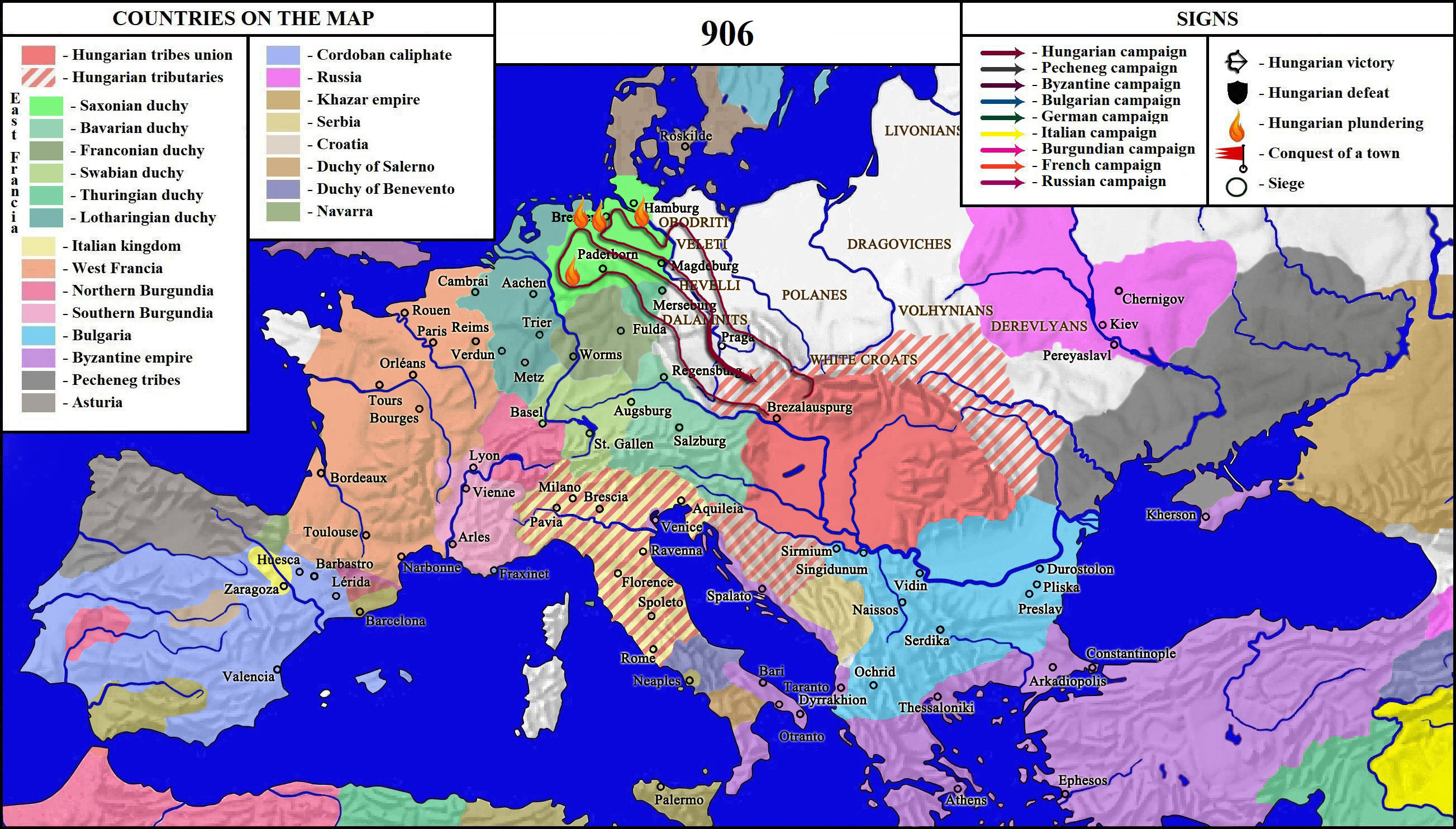
The Hungarian campaign in Saxony of 906

- 906: Two successive Hungarian armies devastated the Duchy of Saxony. The Magyars were asked to come by the Slavic tribe of Dalamancians, which had been threatened by Saxon attacks.
- 907
  - July 4–6: An East Francian army led by Luitpold, Margrave of Bavaria, which aimed to expel the Hungarians from the Carpathian Basin, was annihilated by the Hungarian army in the Battle of Pressburg. Luitpold, Dietmar I, Archbishop of Salzburg, Prince Sieghard, 19 counts, 2 bishops, and 3 abbots were killed in the battle, along with most of their soldiers. This battle is considered the conclusion of the Hungarian Conquest.
  - July–August: The Hungarians assailed Bavaria, causing great destruction and occupying many towns. Returning home, they defeated a Bavarian army at Lengenfeld. The Hungarian-Bavarian border was then fixed on the Enns river.
- 908: Hungarians attacked Thuringia and Saxony, and on 3 August defeated in the Battle of Eisenach the army of Burchard, Duke of Thuringia. Burchard, Egino, Duke of Thuringia, and Rudolf I, Bishop of Würzburg, were killed in the battle.
- 909
  - Spring: Hungarians raided in Bavaria and Swabia.
  - August 4: Hungarians burned the two churches of Freising in Bavaria.
  - August 11: The returning Hungarians were defeated at Pocking by a Bavarian army led by Arnulf, Duke of Bavaria.

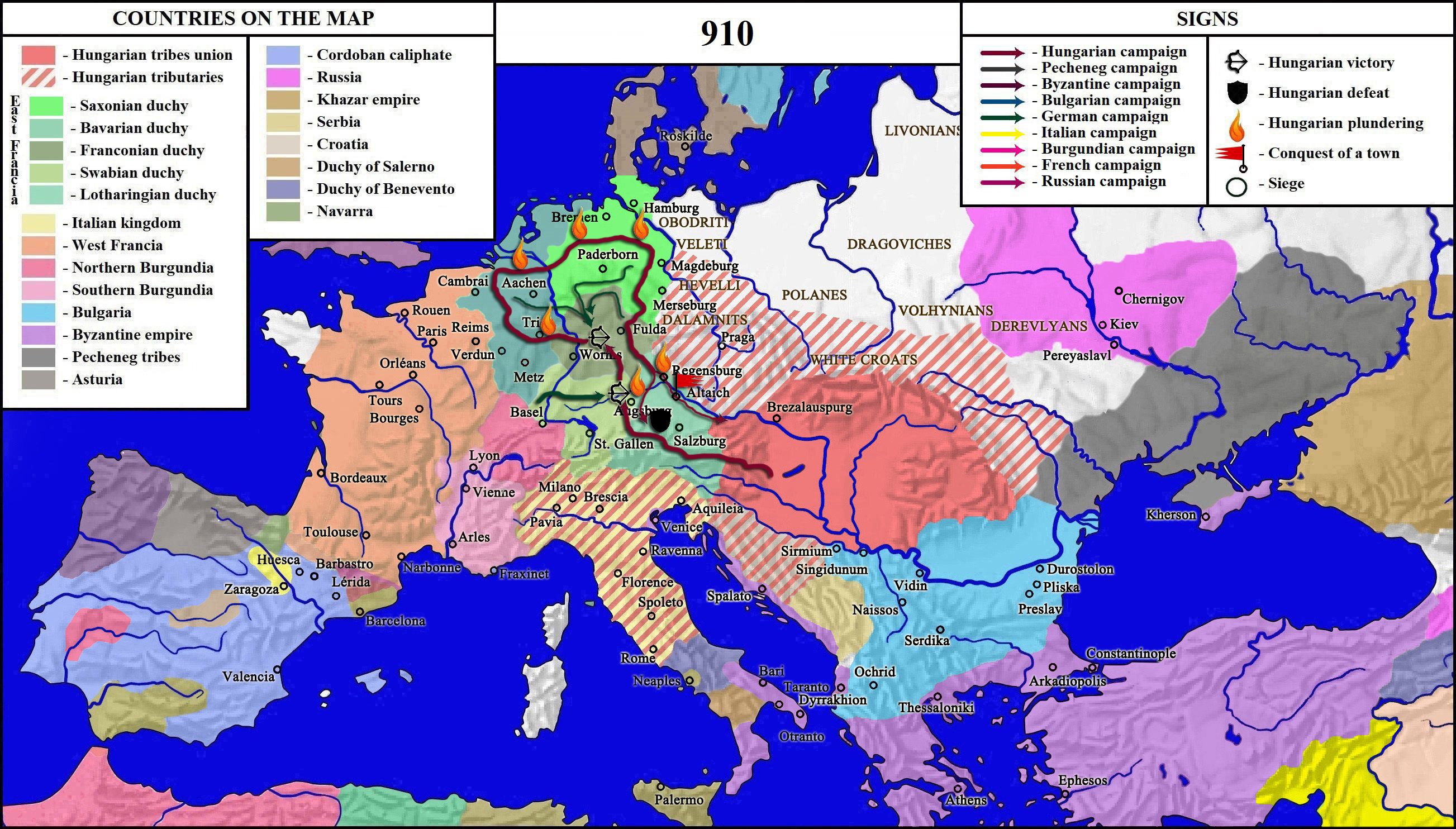
The Hungarian campaign of 910, which resulted the Hungarian victories from Augsburg and Rednitz

- 910
  - June 12: The Hungarians crushed the army of the German king Louis the Child, led by Count Gozbert of Alemannia, in the first Battle of Augsburg. Gozbert and Managolt, count of Alemannia, were killed in the battle.
  - June 22: The same Hungarian army entered Franconia, and defeated a united army of the duchies of Franconia, Lotharingia, and Bavaria in the Battle of Rednitz. The German commander Gebhard, Duke of Lorraine and Liudger, Count of Ladengau, were killed in the battle.
  - King Louis the Child sued for peace and agreed to pay a tribute.
  - The returning Hungarians plundered the outskirts of Regensburg, sack Altaich and Osterhofen, but one of their cavalry units was defeated by Arnulf, Duke of Bavaria at Neuching.
- 911: Hungarian troops crossed Bavaria and attacked Swabia and Franconia, plundering the lands from Meinfeld to Aargau. After that, they crossed the Rhine, and attacked Burgundy for the first time.
- 912: Hungarians attacked Franconia and Thuringia, hoping to force the new East Francian king, Conrad I of Germany, to pay them tribute.

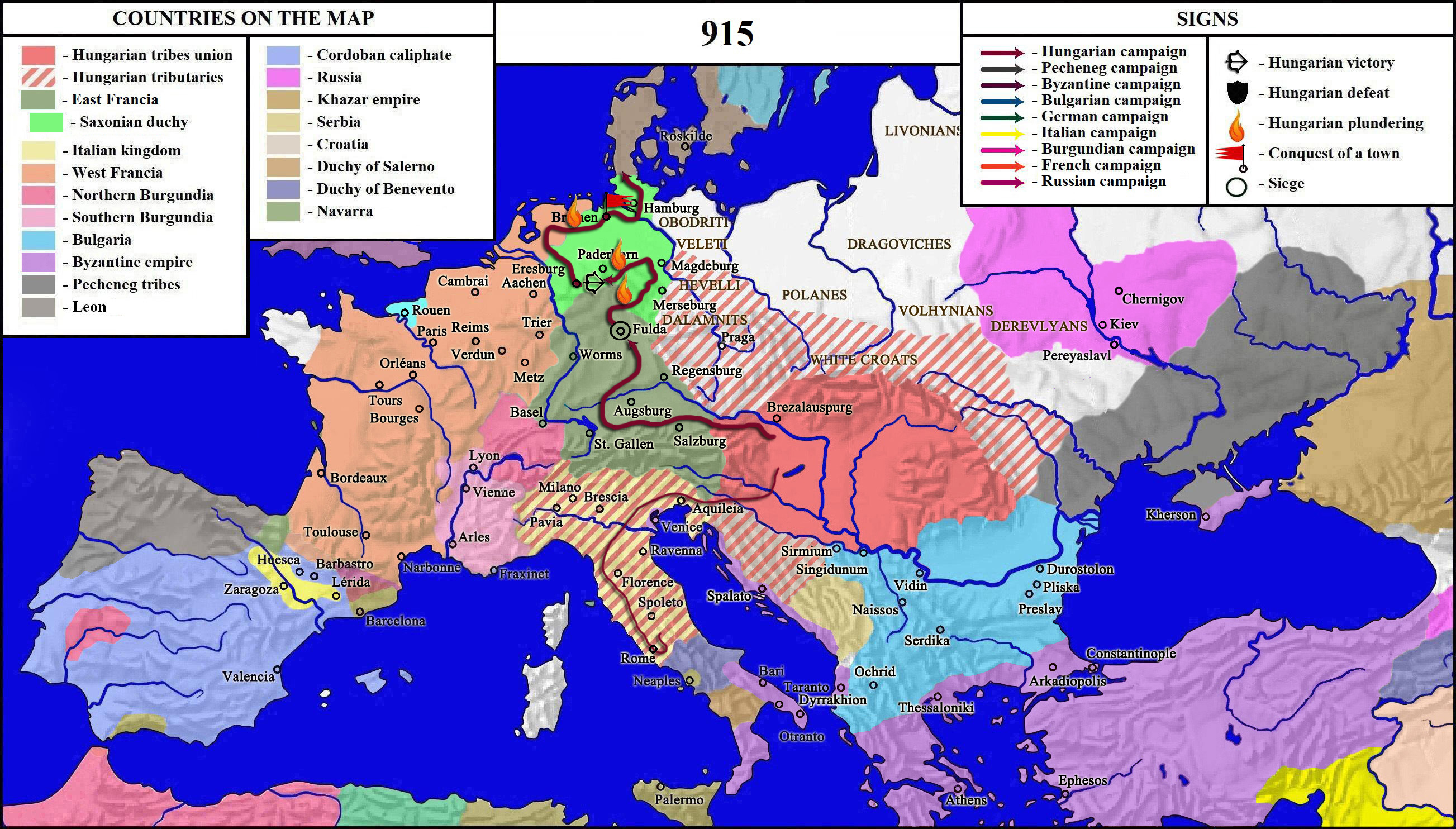
The Hungarian campaigns from 915 in the Eastern Frankish kingdom and Italy

- 913: Hungarians raided Bavaria, Swabia, and Northern Burgundy. Returning, they faced the combined armies of Arnulf, Duke of Bavaria; Erchanger, Duke of Swabia; and Dukes Udalrich and Berchtold, who defeated them at Aschbach near Inn.
- 914: Arnulf, Duke of Bavaria and his family was forced to flee to Hungary by king Conrad I of Germany. The Hungarians promised him help to regain his throne.
- 915: A Hungarian army devastated Swabia, and then Franconia. One of their plundering units attacked the Fulda monastery but was repelled. Hungarians burned the Abbey of Corvey and plundered the monastery St. Ida in Herzfeld. In Saxony, the Hungarians plundered Valun and burned Bremen, and after defeating a Saxon army at Eresburg, they reached the Danish border.
- 916: A Hungarian army aided Arnulf, Duke of Bavaria, in his first, unsuccessful invasion to regain his duchy.

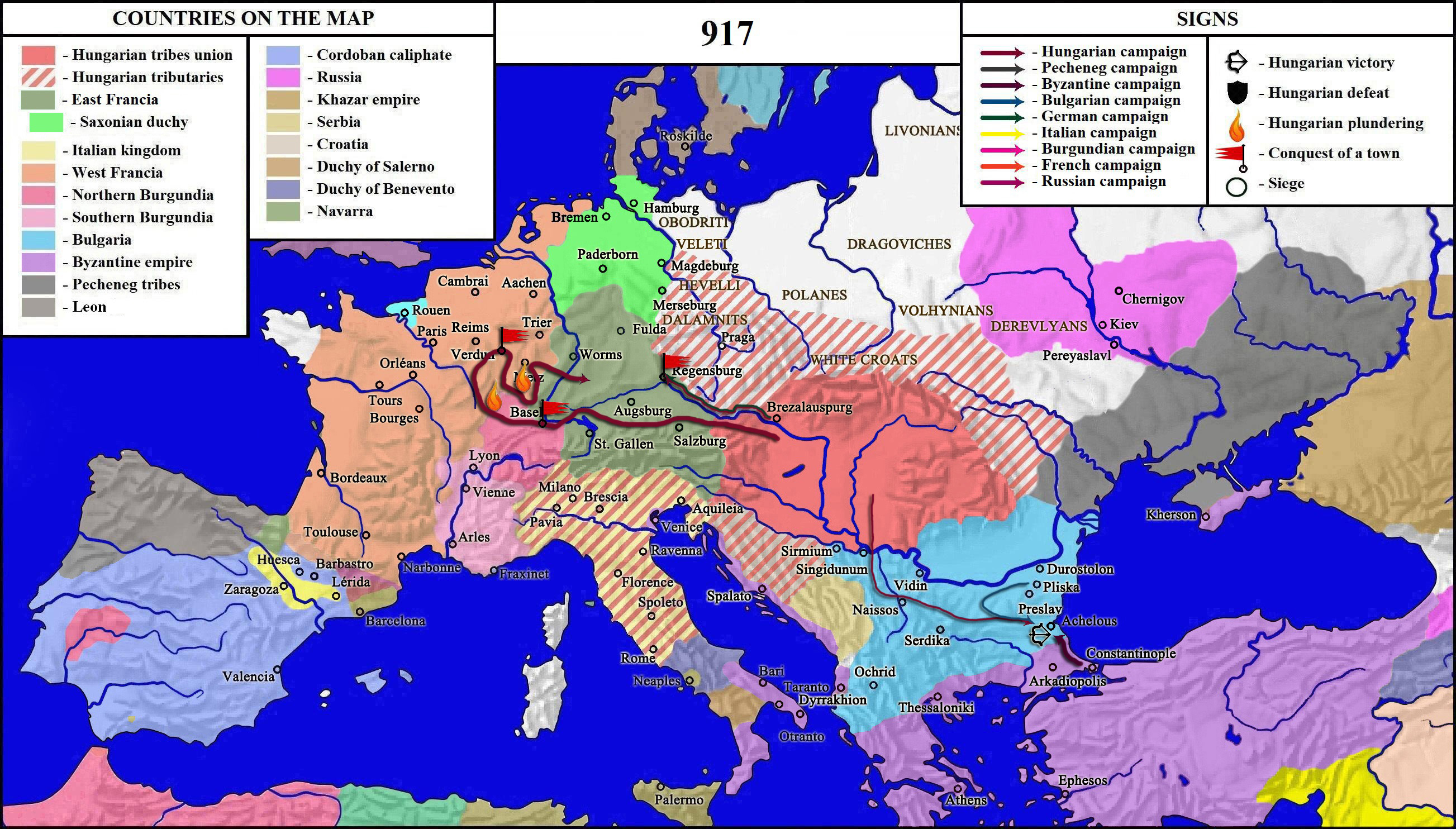
The Hungarian campaigns in Europe in 917

- 917
  - Western invasions
    - January 21: The Hungarians sacked and burned Basel, then invaded the Duchy of Alsace.
    - February: They entered Lotharingia, destroying Verdun, and burning Moyenmoutier and the monasteries of Saint-Dié-des-Vosges and Remiremont.
  - With Hungarian help, Arnulf, Duke of Bavaria finally retook his realm from the forces of Conrad I of Germany. After this he became a faithful ally of the Hungarians, paying them tribute, like his neighbour, Burchard II, Duke of Swabia.
  - Hungarians allegedly helped Simeon I of Bulgaria to defeat the Byzantines in the great Battle of Achelous, but their involvement was described by a single 11th-century source, Miracula Sancti Georgii, which is inconsistent with contemporary records.

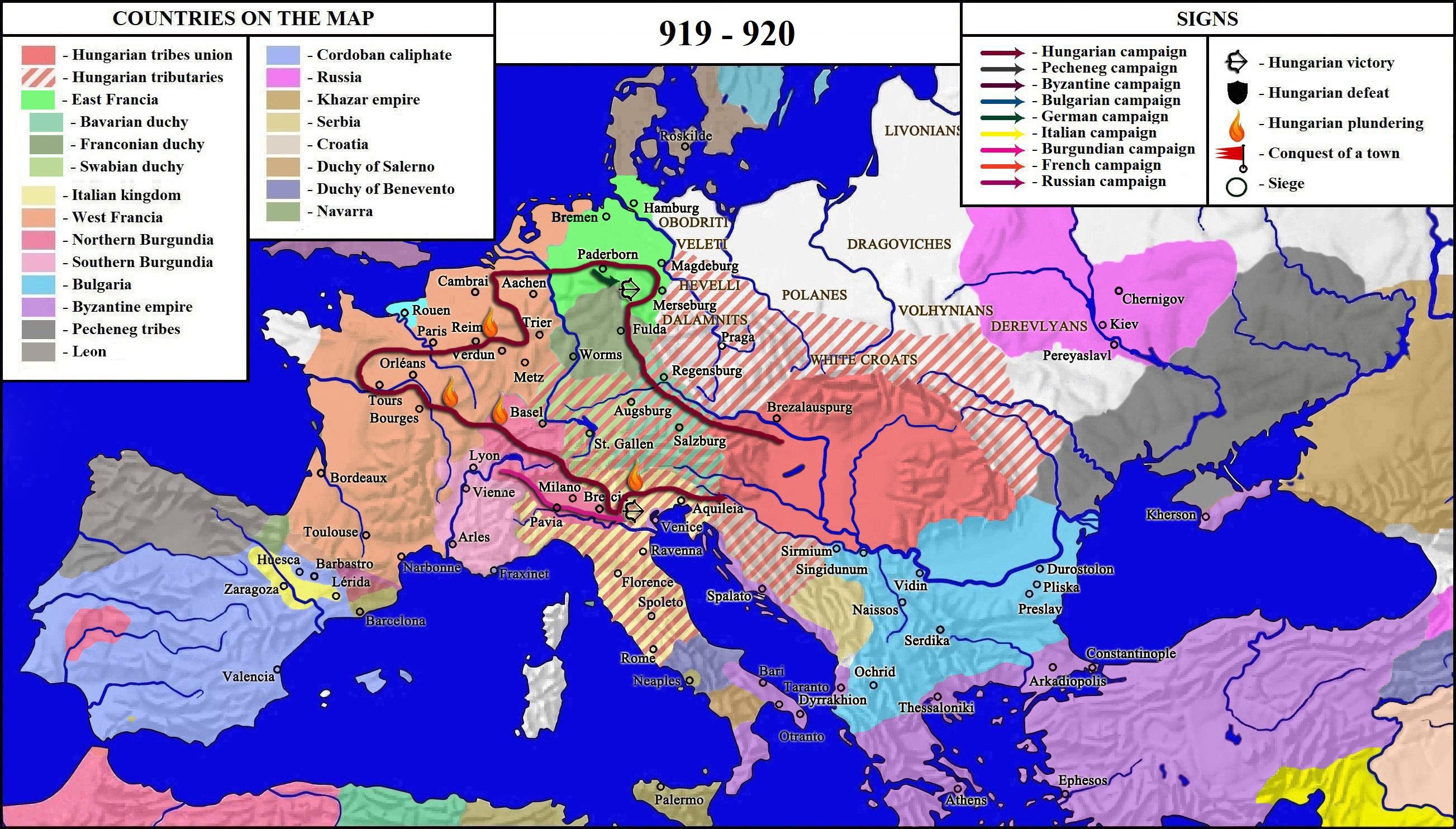
The Hungarian campaign in Europe of 919–920, which resulted in the Hungarian victories of Püchen against the king of East Francia and of 920 against the Burgundian king from 920 in Italy

- 919–920
  - After the election of Henry the Fowler as the new king of East Francia, a Hungarian army entered Germany, and defeated Henry's forces in the Battle of Püchen, then headed west into Lotharingia and modern France. King Charles the Simple could not gather enough forces to face them in a battle, forcing him to retreat and allow them to plunder his realm.
  - Early in 920, this Hungarian army entered Burgundy from the west, then Lombardy, and defeated the forces of Rudolf II of Burgundy, who had attacked Berengar I of Italy, the ally of the Principality of Hungary. After that, the Magyars plundered those Italian cities which they believed had supported Rudolf: Bergamo, Piacenza and Nogara.
- 921–922
  - In 921, a Hungarian army led by Dursac and Bogát entered Northern Italy, annihilating between Brescia and Verona, the forces of the Italian supporters of Rudolf II of Burgundy, killing the palatine Odelrik, and taking captive Gislebert, the count of Bergamo.
  - This army proceeded into southern Italy, where it wintered, and in January 922 plundered the regions between Rome and Naples.
  - February 4: The Magyar army assailed Apulia in Southern Italy, ruled by the Byzantines.

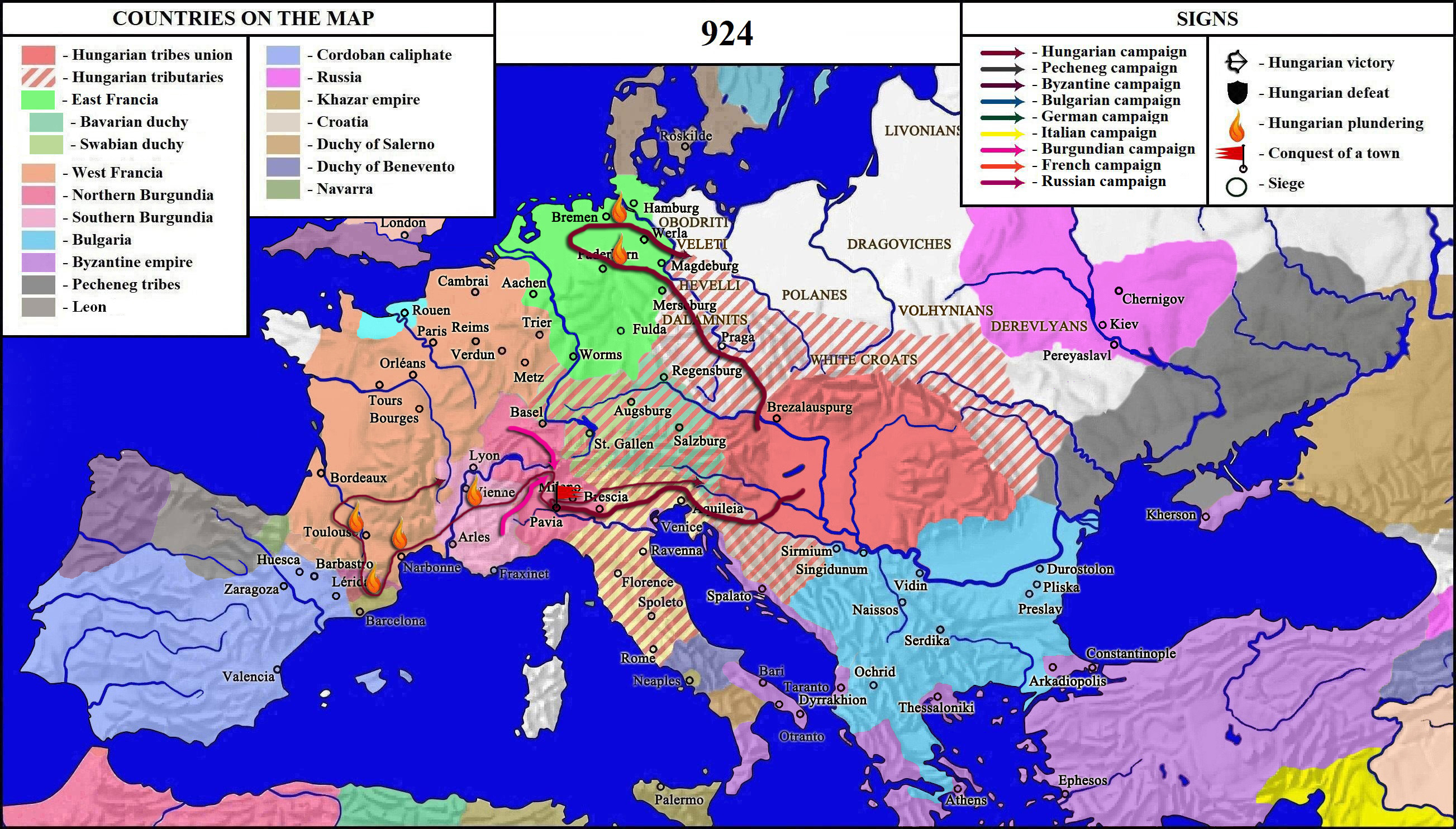
The Hungarians campaigns of 924 in Italy, Burgundy, Southern France and Saxony

- 924
  - Campaign in Italy and Southern France
    - Spring: Rudolf II of Burgundy was elected king of Italy in Pavia by the Italian insurgents. Emperor Berengar I of Italy asked the Hungarians for aid; they sent an army led by Szalárd, which burned Pavia and the war galleys on the shores of the Ticino river.
    - April 7: When emperor Berengar was assassinated in Verona, the Hungarians turned towards Burgundy. Rudolf II of Burgundy and Hugh of Arles tried to encircle them in the passes of the Alps, but the Hungarians escaped from the ambush, and attacked Gothia and the outskirts of Nîmes. They returned home because a plague broke out among them.
  - Campaign in Saxony
    - Another Hungarian army plundered Saxony. The German king Henry the Fowler retreated to the castle of Werla. A Hungarian noble happened to be captured by the Germans, which King Henry used as an opportunity to negotiate peace with the Hungarians, agreeing to pay tribute to the Principality of Hungary.

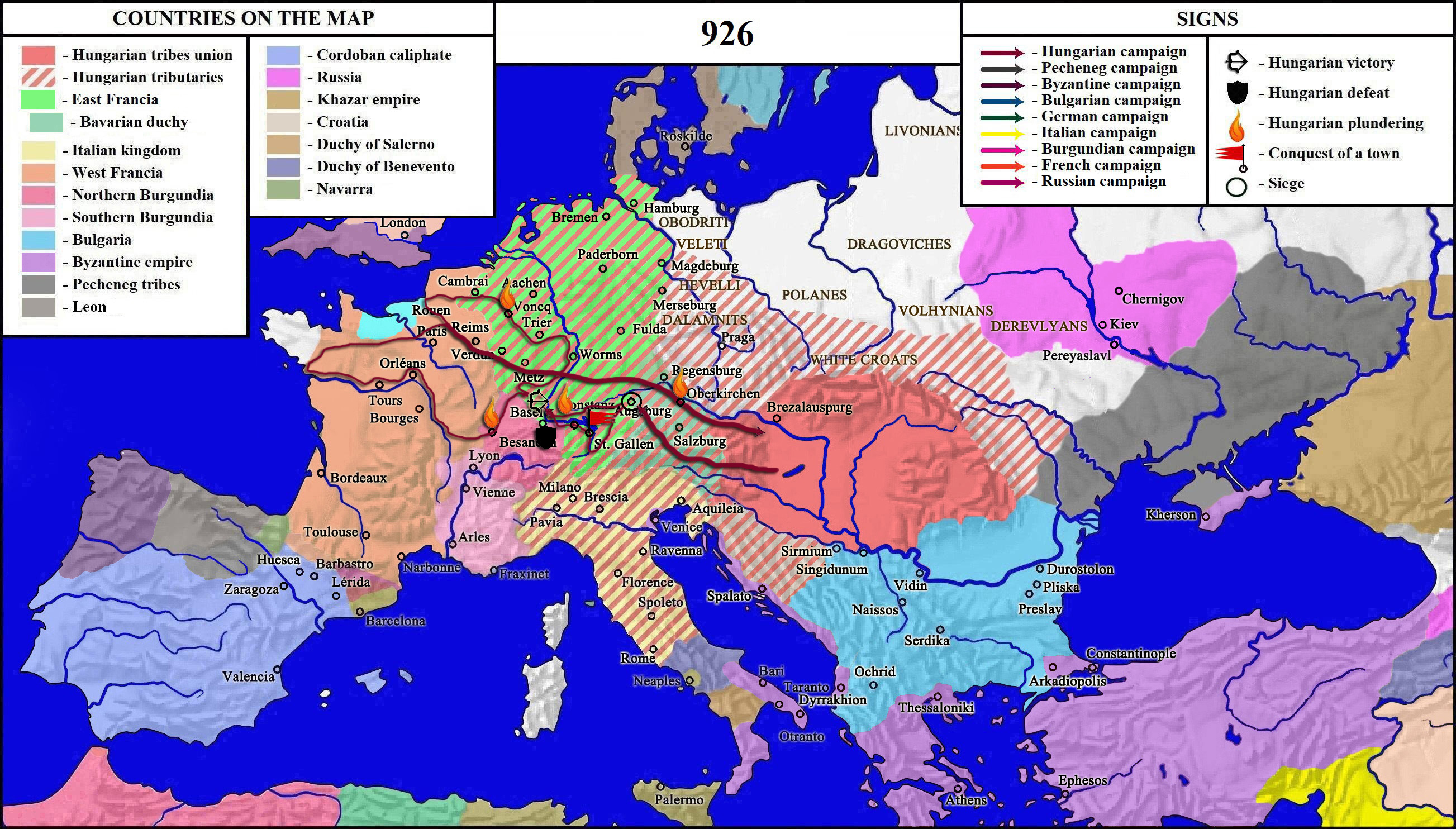
The Hungarian campaign in Europe in 926

- 926
  - May 1–8: Hungarian armies entered Swabia, as allies of the new Italian king, Hugh of Italy, besieged Augsburg, and then occupied the Abbey of Sankt Gallen, where they spared the life of the monk Heribald, whose accounts give a detailed description of their traditions and way of life. From the abbey, they sent minor units to reconnoiter and plunder the surroundings, one of which killed Saint Wiborada, who lived as anchoress in a wood nearby.
  - After May 8: The Magyars besieged Konstanz, burning its outskirts and headed West in the direction of Schaffhausen and Basel. One group was defeated by the locals at Säckingen on the shores of the Rhine. However, the main Hungarian army crossed the Rhine into Alsace with captured ships, and defeated the forces of Count Liutfred. Then, following the Rhine, they proceeded north, looting the area of Voncq, reached the Atlantic Ocean's shores, then returned home via Reims. On their way home, they renewed the alliance with Arnulf, Duke of Bavaria.
  - July 29: The Hungarians destroyed Oberkirchen.

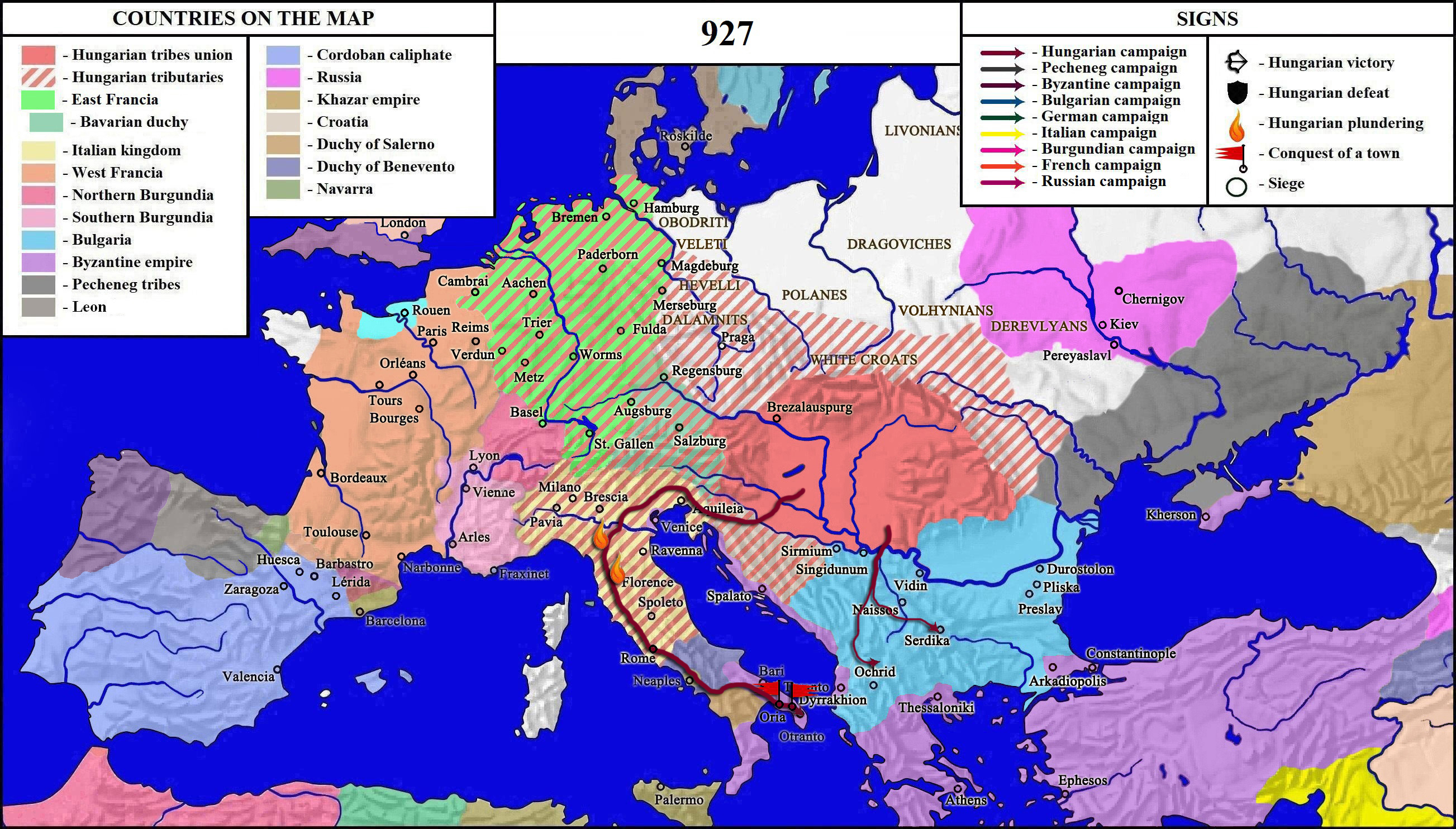
The Hungarian campaigns of 927 in Italy and the Balkans

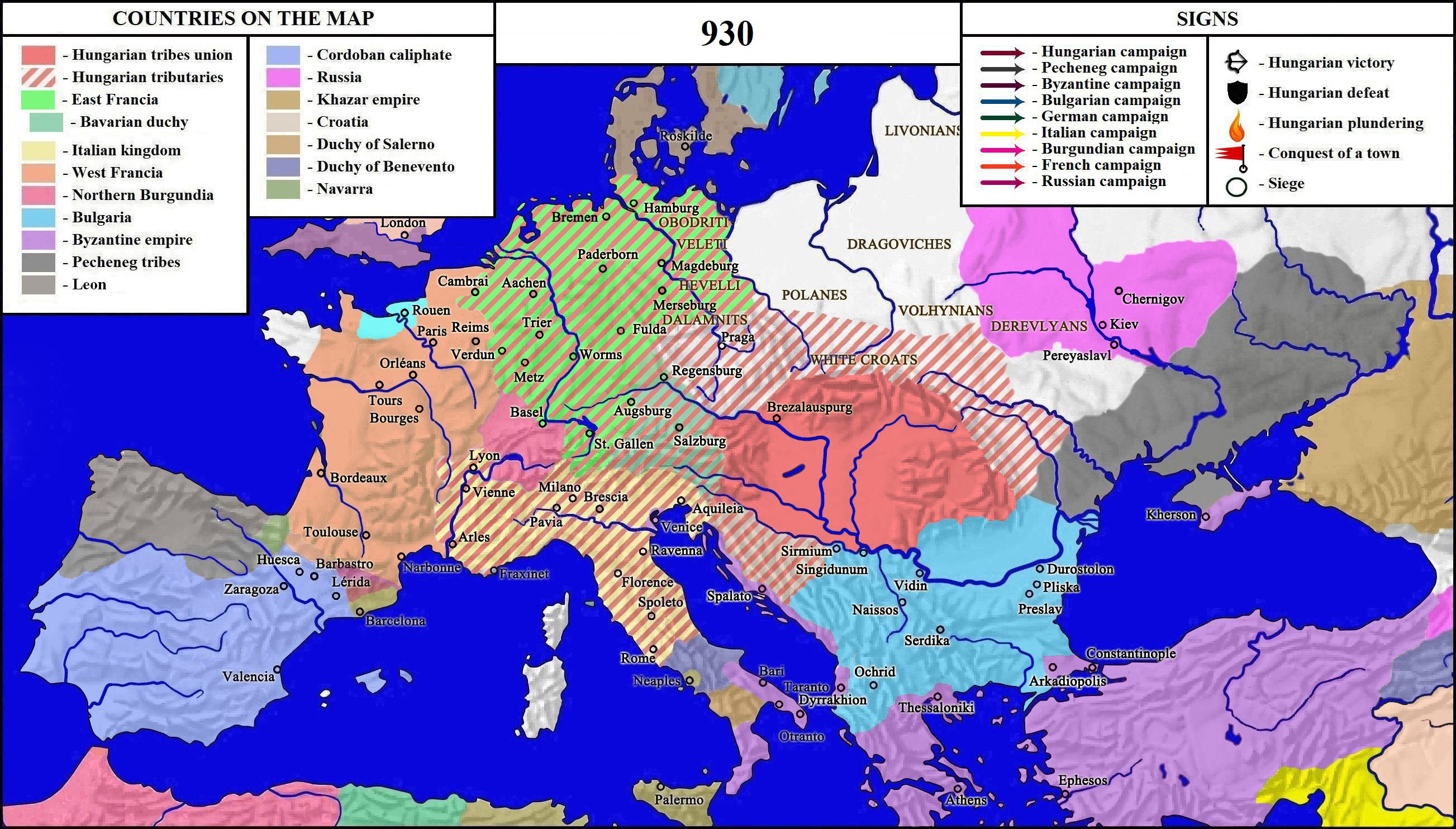
The Hungarian influence in 930. The countries with red stripes paid tribute to the Hungarians.

- 927: ? Hungarian fighters are called by King Hugh of Italy to help Margrave Peter regain his power in Rome, against Pope John X; this succeeded. During and after these events, they plundered Tuscany and Apulia, taking many captives, and occupying the cities of Oria and Taranto.
- 931: A Hungarian army burned the Italian city of Piacenza.
- 933
  - Beginning of March: Because the German king, Henry the Fowler, refused to continue to pay tribute to the Principality of Hungary, a Magyar army invaded Saxony from the lands of the Slavic tribe of Dalamancians. The Hungarians split into two main groups, but the group that tried to outflank Saxony from the west was defeated by the combined forces of Saxony and Thuringia near Gotha.
  - March 15: The other army besieged Merseburg, but was then defeated in the Battle of Riade by Henry the Fowler's army.

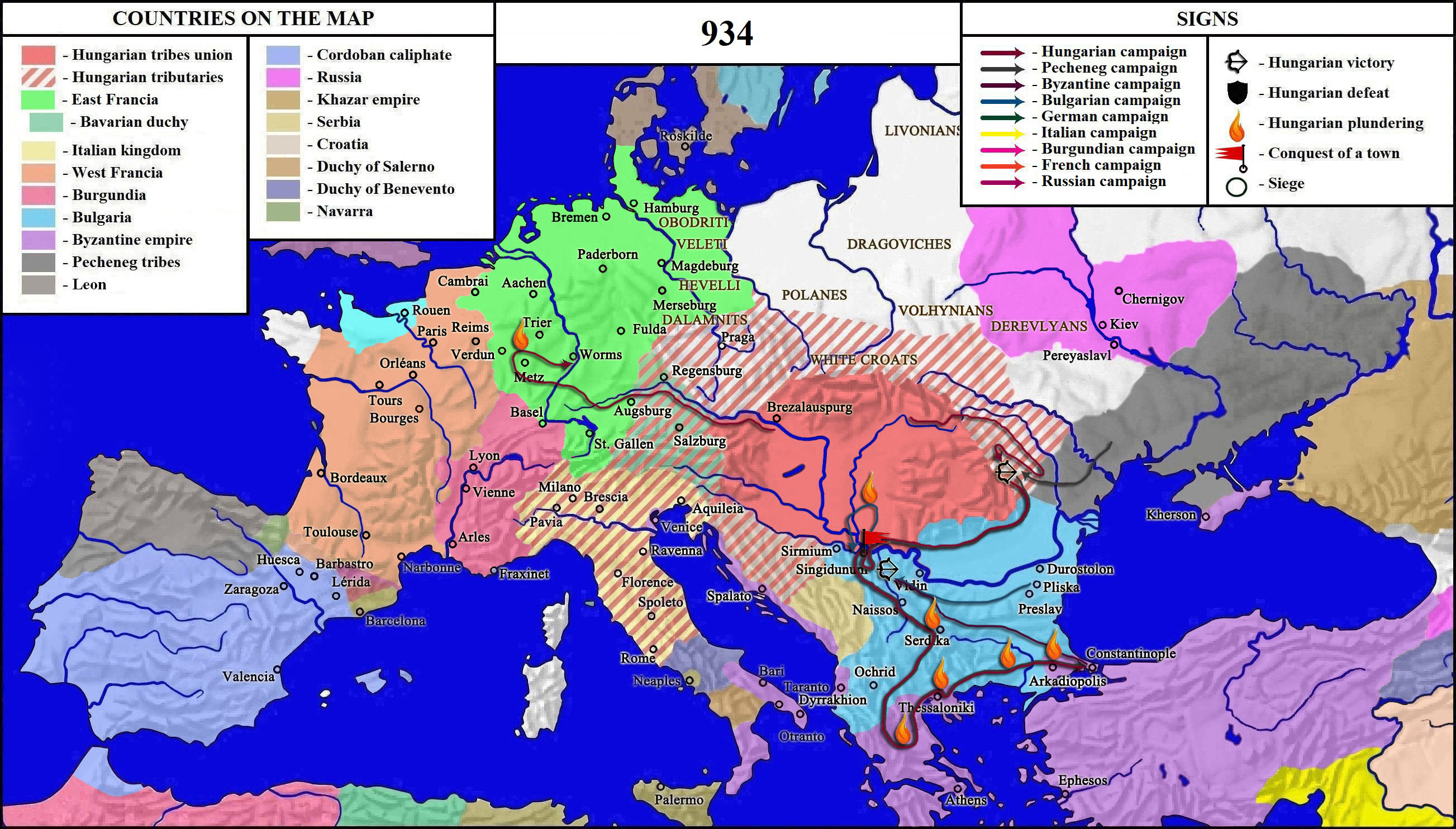
The Hungarian campaign of 934 against Bulgaria and the Byzantine empire, which resulted the start of the Byzantine tribute towards the Hungarians

- 934
  - West
    - A Hungarian army raided the environs of Metz in Lotharingia.
  - Balkans
    - War broke out between the Hungarians and the Pechenegs, but a peace was concluded after news arrived of a Bulgarian invasion of their territories being prepared in the town of W.l.n.d.r (probably Belgrade). The Hungarians and the Pechenegs decided to attack this town.
    - April: The Hungarian-Pecheneg army defeated, in the Battle of W.l.n.d.r, the relieving Byzantine-Bulgarian forces, then conquered the city, and plundered it for three days.
    - May–June: The allies plundered Bulgaria, then headed towards Constantinople, where they camped for 40 days, sacking Thrace and taking many captives. The Byzantine Empire concluded a peace treaty with the Hungarians, ransoming the captives and agreeing to pay tribute to the Principality of Hungary.
- 935: Hungarians raided Aquitaine and Bourges. They returned home via Burgundy and Northern Italy, where they plundered the environs of Brescia.

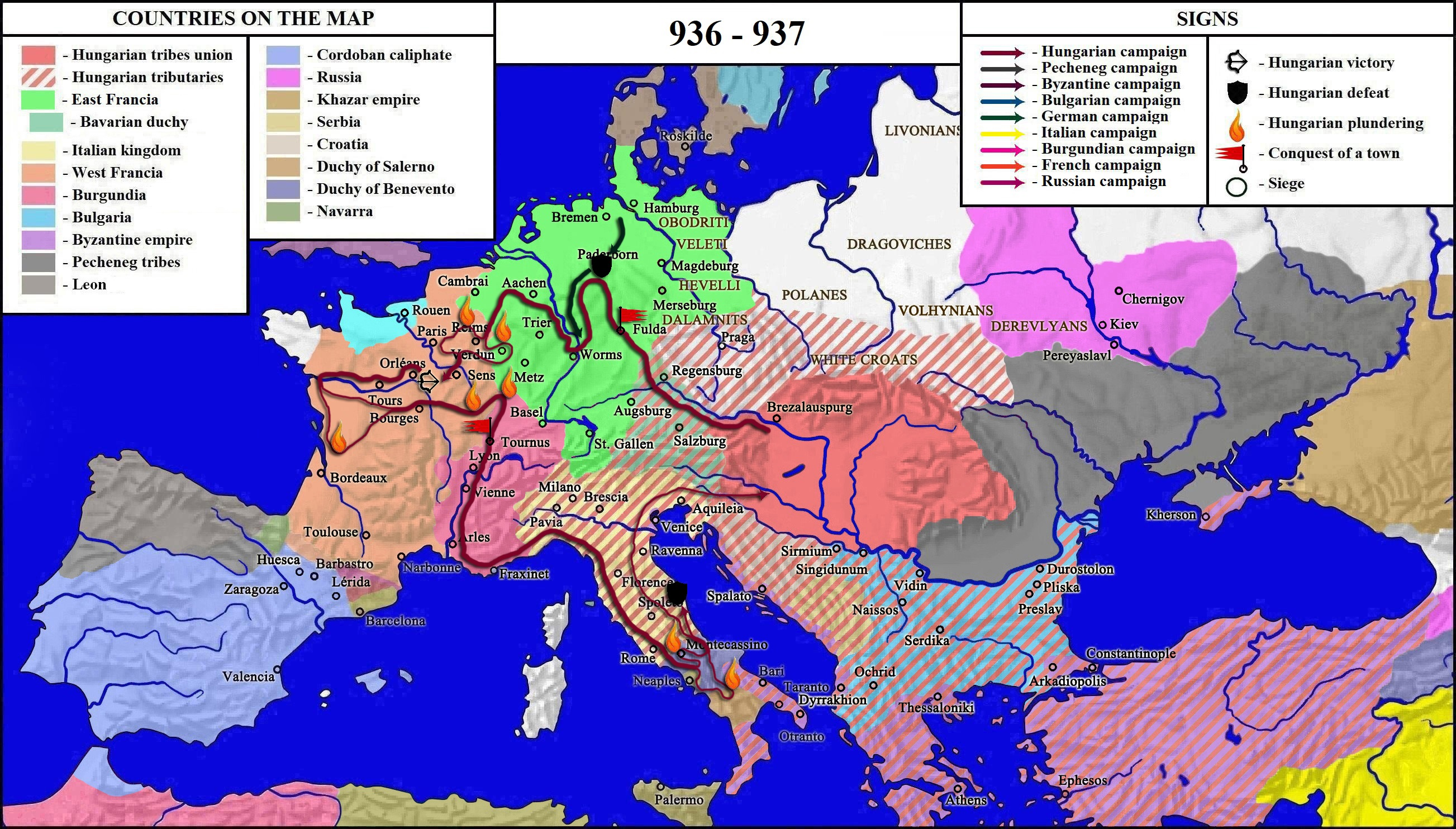
The Hungarian campaign in Europe from 936–937

- 936–937
  - End of 936: The Hungarians, aiming to force the new German king, Otto I, to pay them tribute, attacked Swabia and Franconia, and burned the Fulda monastery. They then entered Saxony, but the new king's forces repelled them towards Lotharingia and West Francia.
  - February 21, 937: They entered Lotharingia, crossing the Rhine at Worms, and advanced towards Namur.

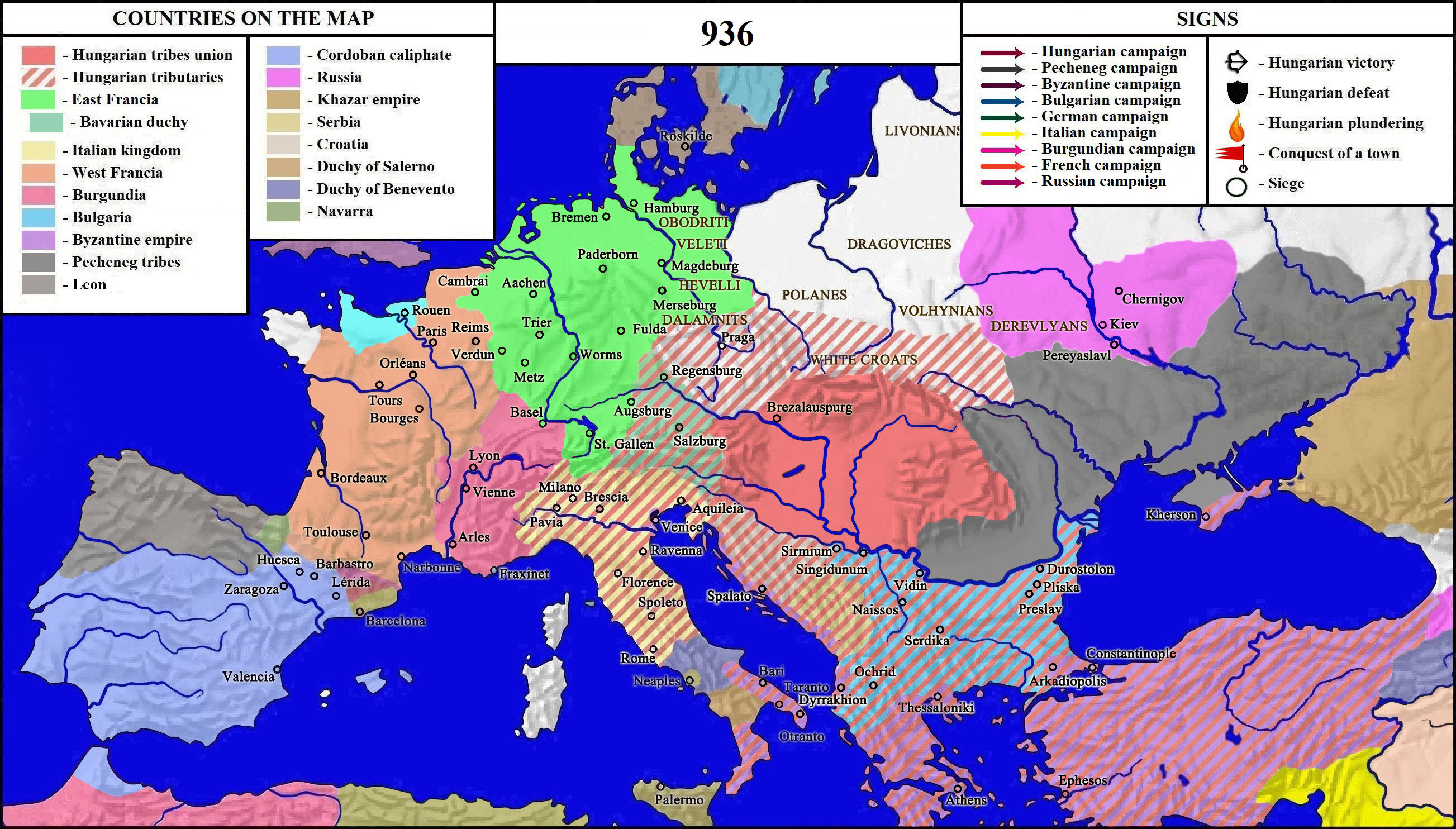
The Hungarian influence in 936. The countries with red stripes paid tribute to the Hungarians.

  - The Hungarians occupied the Abbey of Saint Basolus of Verzy, which they used as headquarters. They then sent plundering groups to attack the abbeys from Orbay, Saint Macra of Fîmes, the city of Bouvancourt.
  - March 24: They reached the city of Sens, where they burned the Abbey of Saint Peter.
  - At Orléans, they fought a French army led by Count Ebbes de Déols, who was wounded in the battle and died soon afterwards. After this, the Hungarians, following the course of the Loire, crossed the whole of France to reach the Atlantic Ocean, then returned south-east, plundering near Bourges.
  - After July 11: The Hungarians entered Burgundy near Dijon, harrying the Abbey of Lure, then plundered the valley of the Rhône, burned the city of Tournus, and occupied the monasteries of Saint Deicolus and Saint Marcell, but failed to take the Monastery of Saint Appollinaris.
  - August: Continuing their campaign, the Hungarians entered Lombardy from the West, where Hugh of Italy asked them to go to Southern Italy to help the Byzantines. The Hungarians plundered the surroundings of Capua, and installed their camp in Campania. They sent smaller groups to plunder the regions of Naples, Benevento, Sarno, Nola and Montecassino. The Abbey of Montecassino gave them objects valued at 200 Byzantine hyperpyrons to ransom the captives.
  - Autumn: One Hungarian group returning home was ambushed in the Abruzzo Mountains by local forces, and lost its plunder.
- 938
  - End of July: The Hungarians attacked Thuringia and Saxony, and made camp at the Bode, north of the Harz mountains, sending raiding parties in every direction. One party was defeated at Wolfenbüttel, and its leader killed; another was misled by Slavic guides on the marshes of Drömling, ambushed, and destroyed by the Germans at Belxa.
  - After 31 August: Hearing of these defeats, the main Hungarian army, camped at the Bode river, withdrew to Carpathia.
- 940 April: The Hungarian auxiliary troops helping Hugh of Italy in his campaign against Rome were victorious at Lateran against the Roman nobles, but are then defeated by the Longobards.

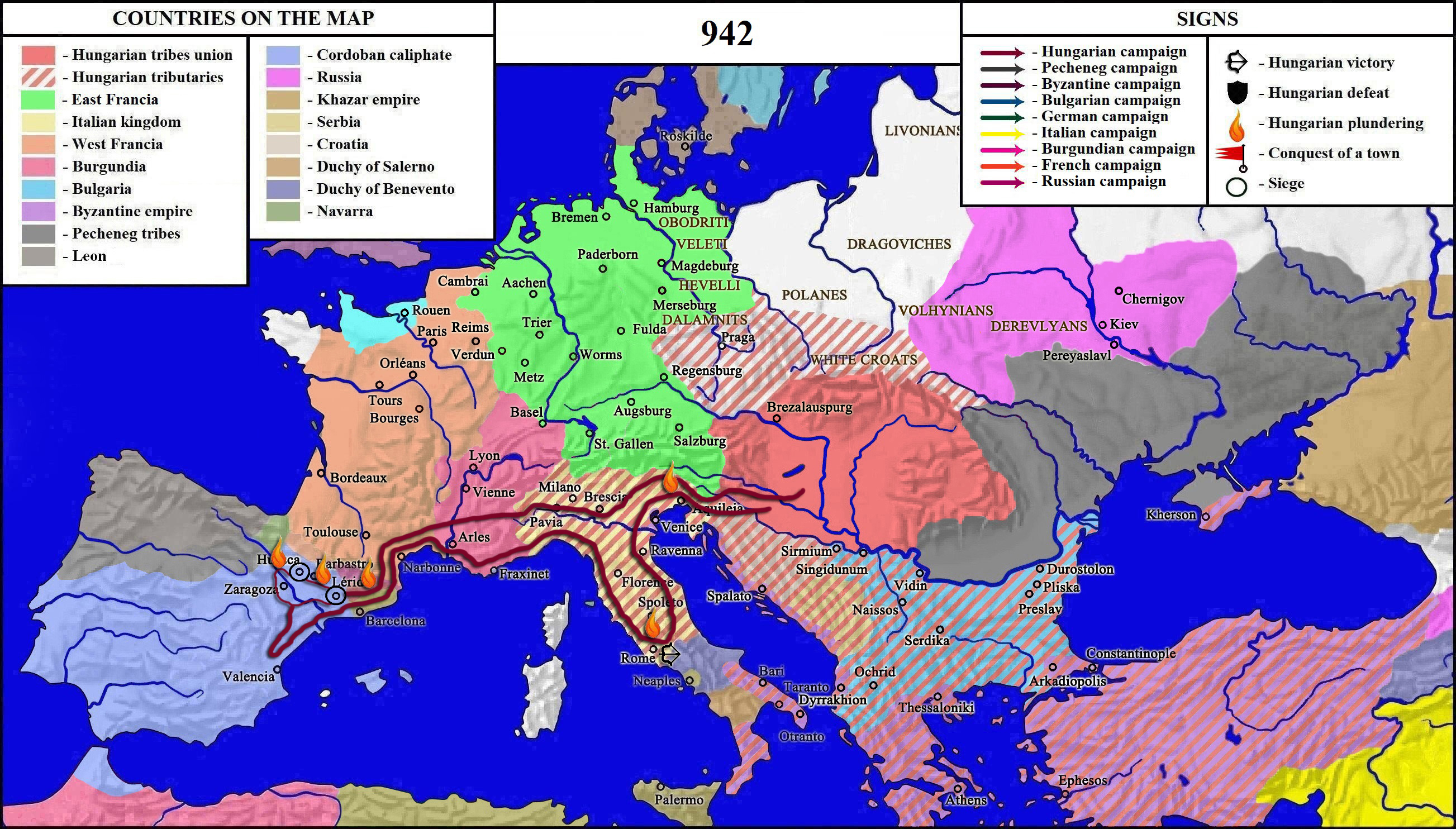
The Hungarian campaign in Italy, Burgundy, Southern France and Spain in 942

- 942
  - Spring: A Hungarian army entered Italy, where King Hugh paid them 10 bushels of gold to invade the Caliphate of Córdoba.
  - Middle of June: They arrived in Catalonia, plundered the region, then entered the northern territories of the Caliphate of Córdoba.
  - June 23: The Hungarians besieged Lérida for 8 days, then attacked Cerdaña and Huesca.
  - June 26: The Hungarians captured Yahya ibn Muhammad ibn al Tawil, the ruler of Barbastro, and held him captive 33 days, until ransom was paid.
  - July: The Hungarians ran low on food and water in an arid region of Spain, killed their Italian guide, and returned towards Italy. Five Hungarian soldiers were taken prisoner by the Cordobans and became bodyguards of the caliph.
  - The Hungarians plundered the region of Latium and defeated a sortie against them from Rome.
- 943
  - Balkans
    - Allied with the Kievan Rus, a Hungarian army invaded the Byzantine Empire. Emperor Romanos I Lekapenos bought peace, and agreed to pay a yearly tribute to the Hungarians.
  - Bavaria
    - The Hungarians who invaded Bavaria were defeated in the Battle of Wels by Berthold, Duke of Bavaria and the Carantanians.
- 947: A Hungarian army, led by prince Taksony, campaigned in Italy, moving southwards along the eastern coast of the peninsula. It besieged Larino and reached Otranto, plundering Apulia for 3 months.
- 948: Two Hungarian armies invaded Bavaria and Karintia. One of them was defeated at Flozzun in Nordgau by Henry I, Duke of Bavaria.
- 949 August 9: The Hungarians defeated the Bavarians at Laa.
- 950: Henry I, Duke of Bavaria attacked Western Hungary, taking captives and plunder.
- 951
  - Spring: Hungarians, crossing through Lombardia, plundered Aquitania.
  - November 20: The returning Hungarians were defeated by the Germans, who in the meanwhile had conquered the Kingdom of Italy.

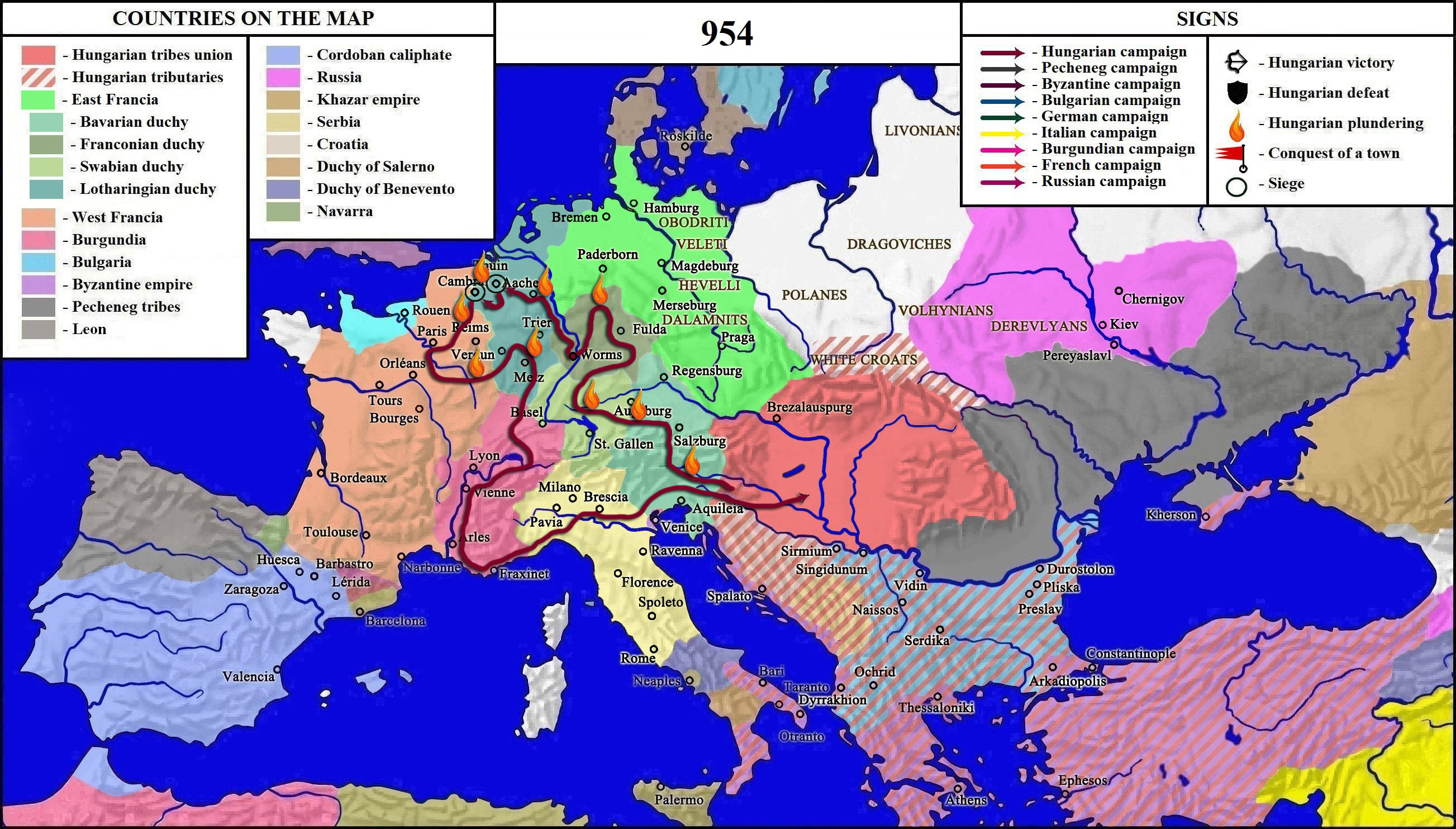
The Hungarian campaign in Europe of 954

- 954
  - German princes rebelled against Otto I, and allied with the Hungarians, who in February sent an army led by Bulcsú to aid them. The Magyar army plundered the domains of Otto's allies in Bavaria, Swabia, and Frankonia.
  - March 1: The Hungarians crossed the Rhine, camping at Worms in the capital of their ally, Conrad, Duke of Lorraine. On March 19, they headed west, attacking the domains of the duke's enemies: Bruno the Great, archbishop of Cologne, and then Count Ragenarius.
  - The Hungarians plundered the regions of Hesbaye and Carbonaria in today's Belgium, plundered and burned the Monastery of Saint Lambert of Hainaut, plundered the monastery of Moorsel, and sacked the cities of Gembloux and Tournai.
  - April 2: They besieged the Lobbes Abbey, but the monks successfully defended the monastery. However, the Hungarians burned the church of Saint Paul, and took with them the treasures of the abbey.
  - April 6–10: The Hungarians besieged the city of Cambrai and burned its outskirts, but were unable to conquer the city. One of Bulcsú's relatives was killed by the defenders, who refused to return his body to the Hungarians, who responded by killing all of their captives and burning the monastery of Saint Géry, near Cambrai.
  - After April 6: The Hungarians crossed the French border, plundering the lands around Laon, Reims, Chalon, Metz, Gorze. After that, they returned home via Burgundy and Northern Italy.
  - In Provence, a Hungarian army battled with Arabs from the Muslim enclave of Fraxinet, when Conrad I of Burgundy fell on them by surprise and defeated both armies.

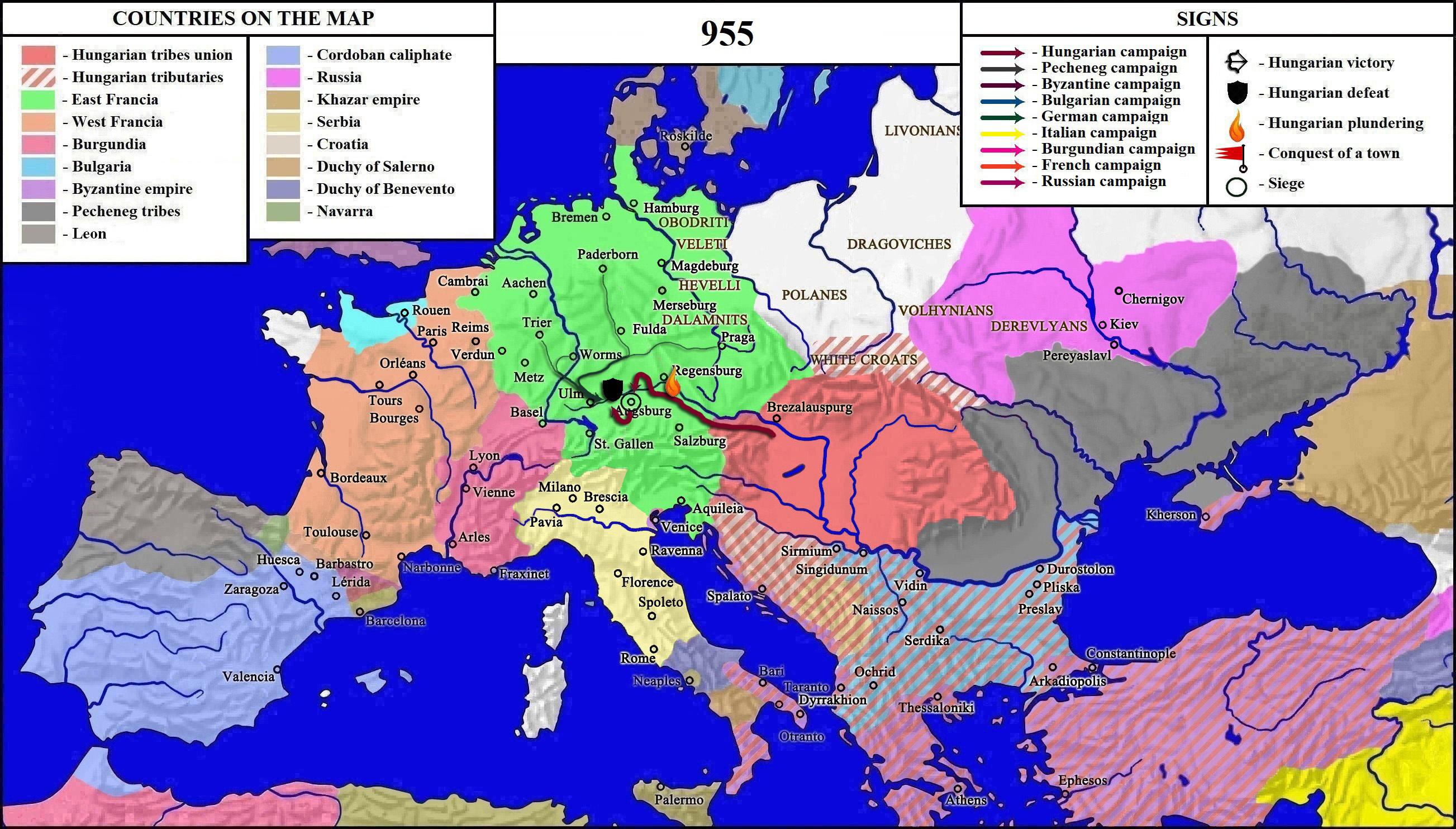
The Hungarian campaign in the German kingdom from 955

- 955
  - Middle of July: Called by the Bavarian and Saxonian rebels, a Hungarian army led by Bulcsú, Lehel, Sur, and Taksony burst into Germany, plundering Bavaria, then entered Swabia and burned many monasteries.
  - Beginning of August: The Hungarians began besieging Augsburg.
  - August 10: The German army of Otto I defeated the main Hungarian army and puts it to flight at the Battle of Lechfeld. Despite the victory, the German losses were heavy, among them many nobles: Conrad, Duke of Lorraine, Count Dietpald, Ulrich count of Aargau, the Bavarian count Berthold, etc.
  - August 10–11: The Germans captured Bulcsú, Lehel, and Sur. Many Hungarians were slain in flight by the Germans.
  - August 15: Bulcsú, Lehel, and Sur were hanged in Regensburg, ending the Hungarian invasions of western Europe.

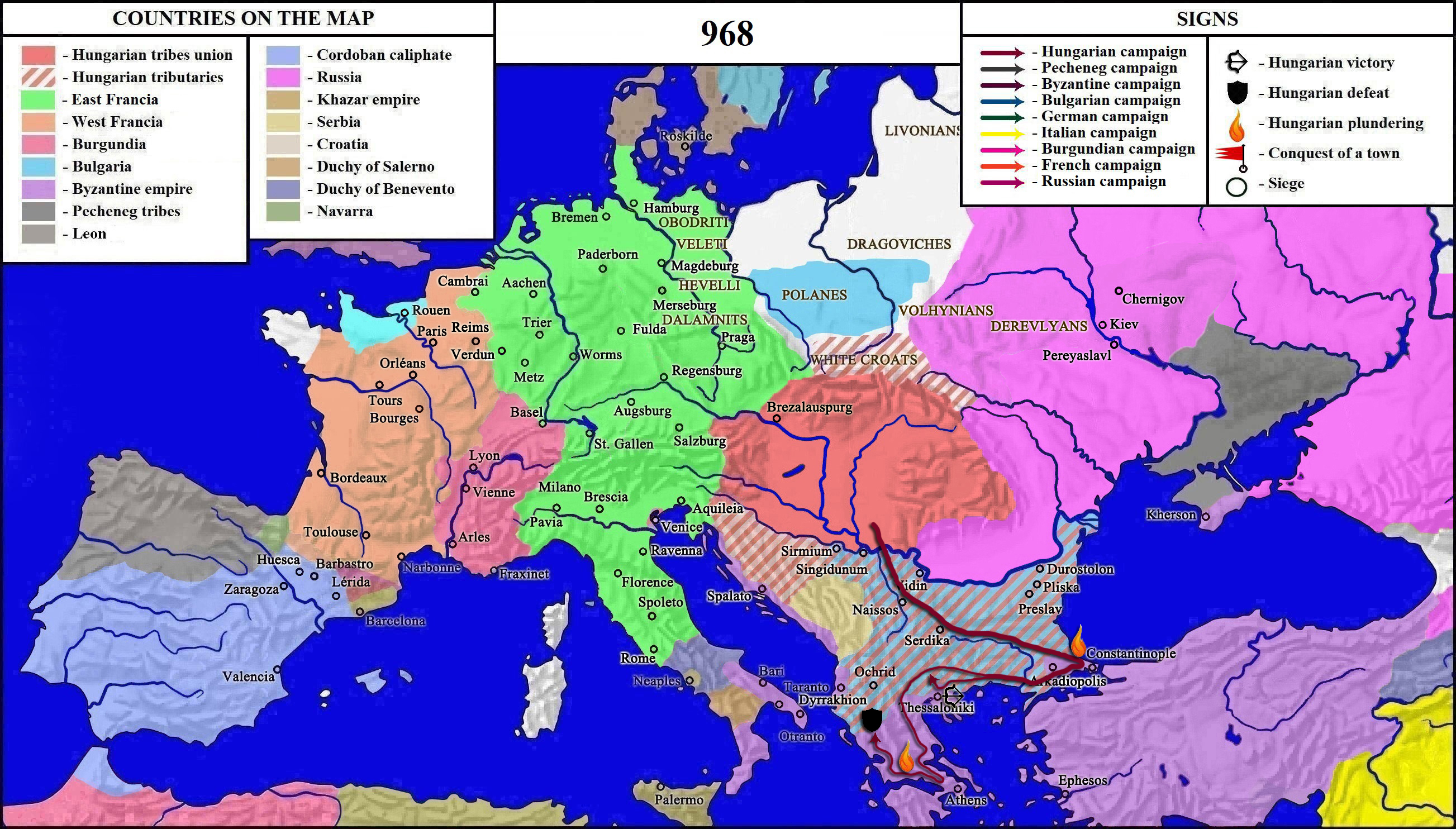
The Hungarian campaign in the Balkans from 968

- 958 April–May: Because in 957, the Byzantines ceased the payment of tribute, a Hungarian army, led by Apor, invaded the empire and plundered its territories as far as Constantinople, but on its return, was defeated by the Byzantines in a night attack.
- 961: A Hungarian army invaded Thrace and Macedonia, but was defeated in another night attack.
- 966: The Hungarians invaded the First Bulgarian Empire, forcing tsar Peter I of Bulgaria to conclude peace with them so they could cross to Byzance.
- 968: A Hungarian force invades the Byzantine Empire, and splits into two groups. Near Thessaloniki, one group of 300 men takes 500 Greek captives, bringing them back to Hungary. The other group of 200 men was ambushed by the Byzantines, who took 40 of them captive. Some became bodyguards of emperor Nikephoros II Phokas.
- 970: Sviatoslav I of Kiev invaded the Byzantine Empire with Hungarian auxiliary troops. The Byzantines defeated Sviatoslav's army in the Battle of Arcadiopolis. This concluded the Hungarian invasions of Europe.

== Tactics ==
Their army used mostly highly mobile light cavalry. Attacking without warning, they quickly plundered the countryside and departed before any defensive force could be organized. If forced to fight, they would harass their enemies with arrows and suddenly retreat, which would tempt their opponents to break ranks and pursue, and the Hungarians would then turn to fight them singly. This tactic is formally known as a feigned retreat.

== Summary of battles ==
Battle	Date	Result	Hungarian commander	Opponent	Notes
At the Danube	894	Victory	* Liüntika	First Bulgarian Empire * Simeon I of Bulgaria	
Silistra	894	Victory	* Liüntika	First Bulgarian Empire * Simeon I of Bulgaria	
Preslav	894	Victory	* Liüntika	First Bulgarian Empire * Simeon I of Bulgaria	
-	894	Defeat	* Liüntika	First Bulgarian Empire * Simeon I of Bulgaria	
Brenta	24 September 899	Victory	-	Kingdom of Italy * Berengar I of Italy	
Laibach	11/18 April 901	Defeat	-	March of Carinthia * Ratold Margrave of Carinthia	
Fischa	903	Defeat	-	Duchy of Bavaria	
-	905	Victory	-	Holy Roman Empire * Louis the Blind	
Pressburg	4-6- July 907	Victory	-	Duchy of Bavaria & East Francia * Luitpold, Margrave of Bavaria † * Dietmar I, Archbishop of Salzburg † * Prince Sieghard †	
Lengenfeld	907	Victory	-	Duchy of Bavaria	
Eisenach	3 August 908	Victory	-	Duchy of Thuringia * Burchard, Duke of Thuringia † * Egino, Duke of Thuringia † * Rudolf I, Bishop of Würzburg †	
Pocking	11 August 909	Defeat	-	Duchy of Bavaria * Arnulf, Duke of Bavaria	
Augsburg	12 June 910	Victory	-	East Francia * Louis the Child * Gozbert Duke of Alemannia † * Managolt Count of Alemannia †	
Rednitz	22 June 910	Victory	-	Duchy of Franconia; Duchy of Lotharingia; Duchy of Bavaria * Gebhard, Duke of Lorraine † * Liudger, Count of Ladengau †	
Neuching	910	Defeat	-	Duchy of Bavaria * Arnulf, Duke of Bavaria	
Aschbach	913	Defeat	-	Duchy of Bavaria * Arnulf, Duke of Bavaria	
Eresburg	915	Victory	-	Duchy of Saxony	
Achelous	20 August 917	Victory	-	Byzantine Empire	the Hungarians fought as a contingent in the army of Simeon I of Bulgaria
Püchen	919	Victory	-	East Francia * Henry the Fowler	
Lombardy	920	Victory	-	Kingdom of Burgundy * Rudolf II of Burgundy	
Brescia	921	Victory	* Dursac * Bogát	Italian rebels * palatine Odelrik † * Gislebert, Count of Bergamo	
Säckingen	926	Defeat	-	Duchy of Swabia	
Alsace	926	Victory	-	Alsace * Liutfrid, Count of Alsace	
Aschbach	933	Defeat	-	Duchy of Saxony; Duchy of Thuringia	
Riade	15 March 933	Defeat	-	East Francia * Henry the Fowler	
W.l.n.d.r.	934	Victory	-	Byzantine Empire; First Bulgarian Empire	
Orléans	937	Victory	-	West Francia * Ebbes de Déols †	
Abruzzo Mountains	937	Defeat	-	Duchy of Benevento	
Wolfenbüttel	938	Defeat	-	East Francia * Otto I	
Belxa	938	Defeat	-	East Francia * Otto I	
Rome	940	Victory	-	Romans	
Lateran	940	Defeat	-	Duchy of Benevento	
Rome	942	Victory	-	Romans	
Wels	943	Defeat	-	Duchy of Bavaria; Carantanians * Berthold, Duke of Bavaria	
Flozzun	948	Defeat	-	Duchy of Bavaria * Henry I, Duke of Bavaria	
Laa	949	Victory	-	Duchy of Bavaria	
Italy	951	Defeat	-	East Francia	
Lechfeld	955	Defeat	* Bulcsú (executed) * Lél (executed) * Súr (executed) *	East Francia * Otto I * Conrad Duke of Lorraine †	
Balkans	958	Defeat	-	Byzantine Empire	
Balkans	961	Defeat	-	Byzantine Empire	
Thessaloniki	968	Victory	-	Byzantine Empire	
Balkans	968	Defeat	-	Byzantine Empire	
Arcadiopolis	970	Defeat	-	Byzantine Empire	the Hungarians fought as a contingent in the army of Sviatoslav I of Kiev

== Aftermath ==
The Hungarians were the last invading people to establish a permanent presence in Central Europe. Paul K. Davis writes, the "Magyar defeat (at the Battle of Lechfeld) ended more than 90 years of their pillaging western Europe and convinced survivors to settle down, creating the basis for the state of Hungary." In the following centuries, the Hungarians adopted western European forms of feudal military organization, including the predominant use of heavily armored cavalry.

== Sources ==
- Nagy, Kálmán (2007). A honfoglalás korának hadtörténete [Military History of the Age of the Hungarian Conquest] (in Hungarian). Budapest: Heraldika Kiadó.
