= Battle of Püchen =

Part of the Hungarian invasions of Europe

- Part of the Hungarian invasions of Europe
Date	919
Location	near the town Püchen, today Püchau, a district of the town Machern in Saxony
Result	Hungarian victory

Belligerents
East Francia	Principality of Hungary

Commanders and leaders
Henry the Fowler	Unknown Hungarian Commander

Casualties and losses
Heavy	Not significant

The Battle of Püchen was fought in the summer of 919, between a Hungarian raiding army and the newly elected East Francian/German king Henry the Fowler, and ended with a Hungarian victory. This battle was a part of a long range Magyar raiding campaign, which lasted between the summer of 919 and the late winter or early spring of 920, and took part in countries like East Francia, West Francia, Burgundy and the Kingdom of Italy, resulting in victorious battles against the German king Henry the Fowler and the Burgundian king Rudolf II, while the West Francian and Lotharingian king Charles the Simple had no courage to face them.

== Sources ==
The Chronicon of Thietmar of Merseburg has the only account of this battle. In addition other chronicles account the Hungarian campaign against Saxony: Antapodosis, seu rerum per Europam gestarum, written by Liutprand of Cremona, Annales Corbeienses, etc.

== Background ==
After the defeat of Pressburg in 907, resulting in the death of his father Luitpold, and of a big part of the Bavarian elite, the new duke of Bavaria, Arnulf, tried to shape a modus vivendi with the Hungarians, which consisted in paying a tribute to them, letting their armies cross his lands when they went to attack other countries, and using their help to defeat his enemies. When in 914, he was chased away by the East Francian king Conrad I from his throne, he with his family retreated to Hungary, and, after an unsuccessful attempt in 916, he regained his duchy with Magyar's help in 917. This occurred while the Hungarians, continuing their campaign towards West, occupied and burned Basel, a city which was, several months before, captured by Conrad I from the supporters of Arnulf and his ally, Burchard II, Duke of Swabia. Conrad was an enemy of the Hungarians, trying to oppose them, and was really angered by the alliance between his stepson (he was married with Arnulf's mother, Kunigunde) and the Hungarians, and by the fact, that he, instead of stopping them on his borders, he let them to cross unharmed, every time when they started a campaign to West. So, this was one of the causes of the hostility between the king and the duke. After Arnulf came back with his family, and took back his throne, Conrad again attacked Bavaria, but was defeated and wounded by Arnulf in a battle, and died on 23 December 918. With the death of Conrad I, Arnulf, helped by Burchard II, Duke of Swabia, hoped that he could be elected as East Francian king, but as a final revenge, the king, on his death-bed, designated Henry, the duke of Saxony as new king; a choice which was confirmed also by the assembly of Fritzlar, in May 919 by the nobles from Saxonia and Franconia.

== Prelude ==
Historians agree that the Hungarian campaign of 919-920 started from Arnulf's thirst for revenge, because Henry the Fowler was elected as German king and not him. Liutprand of Cremona writes that the cause of the campaign was to force the new king to pay tribute, and the most persuasive instrument to convince him, was an army. Liutprand refers to the fact that Conrad I paid a tribute to the Hungarians (however, this information was not strengthened by other contemporary sources), and the Hungarians wanted this tribute to continue during Henry's reign too. Besides, the same chroniclers account about the payment of tribute from Bavarians, Swabians, Francians and Saxons refers to this period, which starts from 910. This is why the Hungarians wanted to know, if the tribute received by them from the German duchies will continue or not? Because they were afraid that a strong king could change this situation, uniting against them the forces of the duchies.

Henry fought even before 919 with the Hungarians. For example, in 915, when he was just duke, they attacked Saxony, Henry or one of his commanders having been vanquished by them at Eresburg, and during the same campaign they burned the city of Bremen.

== Battle ==
In Saxony, Henry's army faced the Hungarians at Püchen. Unfortunately, we do not have a detailed account of the battle from the Chronicon of Thietmar (the only contemporary source which mentions the battle), which reports only that King Henry wanted to stop them at Püchen, but was defeated and barely saved his life by fleeing to the above-mentioned city.

However, a secondary source can enlighten us about some aspects of the battle. Liutprand of Cremona, when he describes the Battle of Riade fought in 933 in which the same King Henry defeated the Hungarians, writes down the speech which the king delivered to his soldiers before the battle. Henry instructed his cavalry to attack the Hungarians in a single unbroken line, holding their shields to ward off the arrows of the enemy, and then to charge them without breaking ranks. Thus the Hungarian archers would be prevented from nocking their arrows and shooting again, and the lightly armored Magyars would not be able to withstand the charge of the German heavy cavalry. For this reason, Henry advised his heavy cavalry to attack in unbroken lines the Hungarians at their first attack, driving them from the battlefield without letting them regroup and attack again. This early attack of the Germans, unusual in their warfare, prevented the heavy losses provoked by the Hungarian arrows in a long fight, which also prevented the dissolution of their battle order, while the light armored enemy had no chance of success against their advancing wall of shields and spears of the heavy cavalry. This shows that in 933, Henry the Fowler had deep knowledge about the nomadic war tactics of the Hungarians, based on disrupting the enemies' battle order, then "covering" the tangled enemy lines with their arrows, which without their battle order suffered heavy losses. He could acquire this knowledge only from the battles he fought against the Hungarians. According to the sources, the last battle which he fought against them was the battle of Riade. It is very likely that he used his experience gained from the tactics of the Hungarians seen in this battle, and based on this, he found an effective solution for countering these tactics. The solution used thus by King Henry reflect the tactics used by the Hungarians in the battle of Püchen.

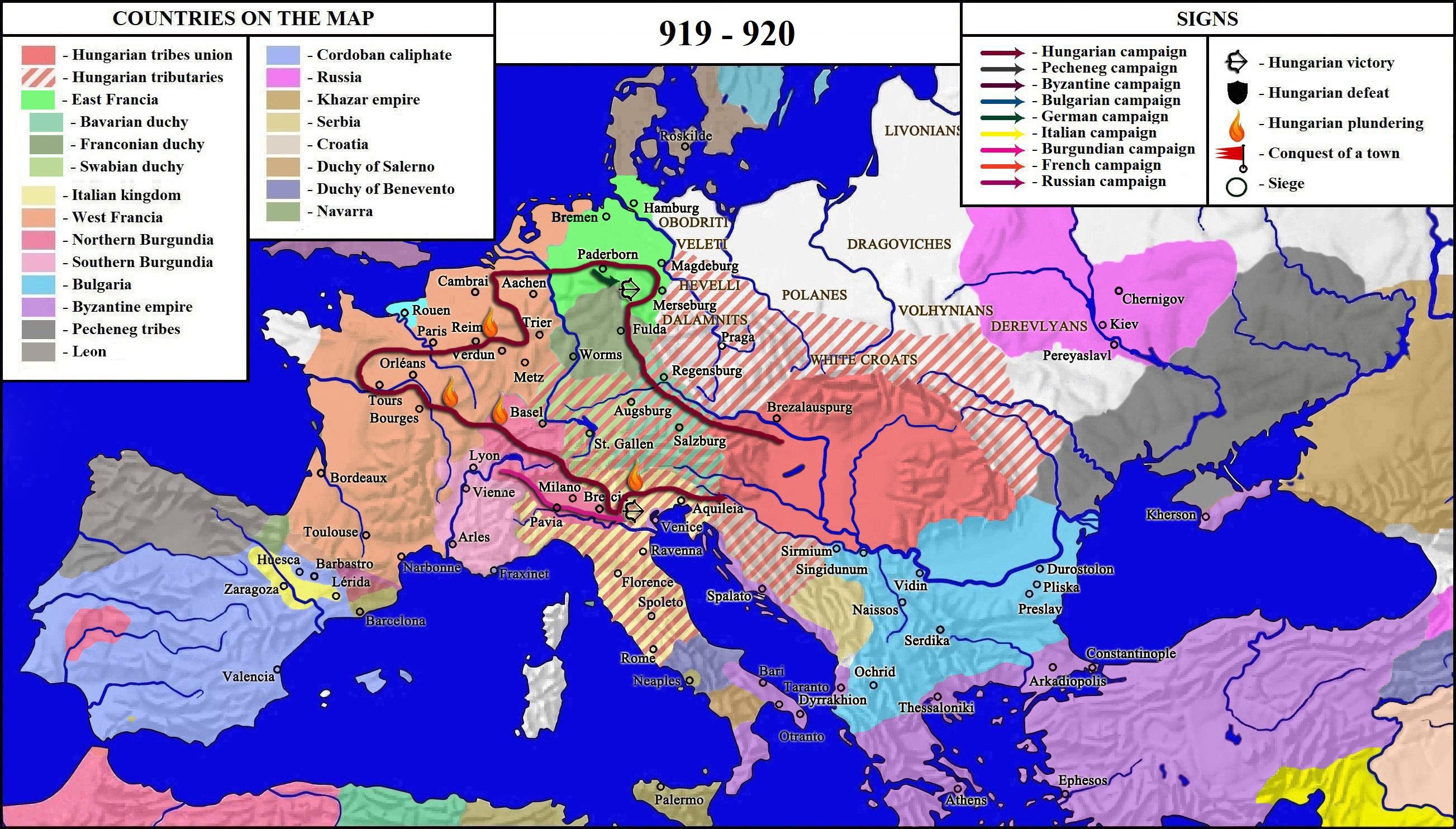
The Hungarian campaign in Europe of 919-920, which resulted in the Hungarian victories of Püchen against the king of East Francia and of 920 against the Burgundian king from 920 in Italy.

Based on this secondary source, we can conclude that in the Battle of Püchen, the Hungarians used their most known war tactic: The Hungarian army had units which attacked and shot from distance at the German lines, which defended themselves using their shields. At one moment the attacking Hungarian units feigned retreat, luring the Germans after them into a place where the main Hungarian forces waited, encircling the now disintegrated German battle lines, which because of this, could not be controlled anymore. After launching storms of arrows upon them from all directions, the Hungarians at last finished the job in close combat with their swords and lances.

As mentioned before, the king escaped in the city of Püchen. Because of his escape, he gave to the people of Püchen great privileges, which were the biggest in the country, and besides this, gave them presents too. These great privileges and rich presents show that king Henry was in great danger to lose his life, so his defeat and losses had to be heavy. From Annales Corbeienses, we know that after the battle, the Hungarians "cruelly plundered Saxony", and took a large amount of plunder. We do not know if this battle had other consequences, e.g., the restarting of the payment of the tribute from the German king. However, in 924, after another campaign in Saxony, when the king, still remembering his defeat at Püchen and feeling himself too weak to resist further, retreated into the castle of Werla. Subsequently, the accidental falling of an important Hungarian prince or commander into the Germans' hands induced the Magyars to negotiate with Henry, after which a peace treaty was concluded in which the king accepted to pay tribute to the Magyars for nine years.

== Aftermath ==
After the victory against Henry the Fowler, the Hungarian army continued the campaign towards West Francia, entering Lotharingia, in those times a French province, towards the end of 919. The West Francian king Charles the Simple sent an order to all the nobles and forces of the duchy to join his army, to fight against them, but besides Heribert, the archbishop of Reims, and his 1500 soldiers, nobody wanted to risk their lives. So the king had to retreat in one of his fortified towns, and let them plunder his realm; so, they pillaged Lotharingia and many parts of France. The fact that the French king and his nobles let the Hungarians do what they please in West Francia shows how afraid they were from fighting against them in an open battle. Certainly, they heard the news of the heavy defeats suffered by the Germans, which caused so many deaths among the dukes and nobles of the neighbouring country.

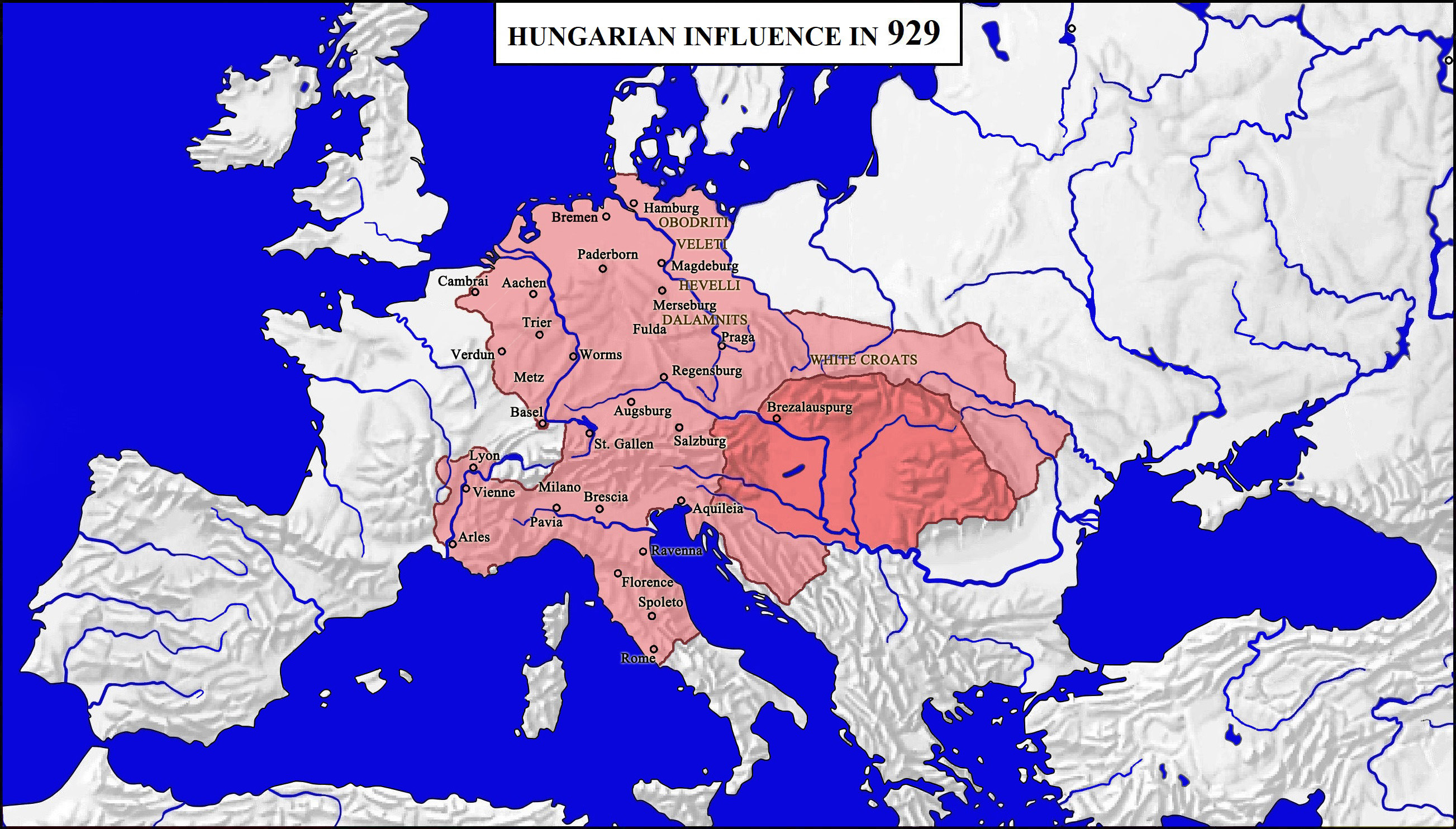
Hungary and the regions which paid tribute or protection money to it between 926-932

In the winter of the year 920, the Hungarians appear first in Burgundy, then in the Italian Kingdom, in Lombardy, coming from North-West or West, which is West Francia. This route will be used by them in other years too, for example in 937 and 954. The majority of the historians conclude that the Italian campaign from 920 was made by the Hungarians which defeated Henry the Fowler and plundered Lotharingia and France, now in their way towards home. Besides that, Italy seemed to be an obvious return route for the Hungarians – because its king, Berengar I, was one of their most loyal ally. They had another reason as well–some of the Italians were discontented with Berengar, and invited the king of Upper Burgundy, Rudolf II to be their ruler. So, Rudolf II attacked Italy through Lombardy. Since Berengar paid tribute to the Hungarians, and in exchange they committed themselves to defend him against his enemies; furthermore, the king had many personal friends among the Hungarian commanders. It is certain that he sent envoys to the Hungarians, which were in France, to help him against Rudolf. This is why in February 920, the returning Hungarian army reached from behind the army of the Burgundian king and his Italian allies, and defeated them, and then plundered the surroundings of those Italian cities (for example Bergamo), which supported Rudolf. Despite his defeat, Rudolf II continued to be the candidate for the Italian throne, supported the Italian revolts, and attacked Italy, and Berengar used again the Hungarian troops against them. For example, in 921 Hungarian troops led by Dursac and Bogát defeated the Italian insurgents between Brescia and Verona, and on 24 March 924 the Magyar forces led by Szalárd occupied Pavia, the Italian kingdoms capital, at the request of Berengar, because the city became supporter of Rudolf II. Despite this help, Berengar I was assassinated on 7 April 924 in Verona, and finally Rudolf II was elected as king of Italy. But soon, the Italians revolted against him too, and in 926 he was defeated and forced to renounce from the Italian kingdom, by his former ally, Hugh of Arles, allied with the Hungarians. Hugh of Arles became king of Italy, and the price was that he started to pay a tribute to the Hungarians.

The Hungarian victory at Püchen assured the Hungarian military superiority in Central, Western and Southern Europe for another fourteen years (until 933, the Battle of Riade), strengthened their alliances with countries which paid them tribute (Bavaria, Swabia, Kingdom of Italy), assured, from 924, the tribute of East Francia, and widened the length and range of the Hungarian campaigns until the shores of Atlantic Ocean, borders of Spain and Southern Italy.
