= 939 =

Calendar year

939 in various calendars
- Gregorian calendar: 939; CMXXXIX
- Ab urbe condita: 1692
- Armenian calendar: 388; ԹՎ ՅՁԸ
- Assyrian calendar: 5689
- Balinese saka calendar: 860–861
- Bengali calendar: 345–346
- Berber calendar: 1889
- Buddhist calendar: 1483
- Burmese calendar: 301
- Byzantine calendar: 6447–6448
- Chinese calendar: 戊戌年 (Earth Dog); 3636 or 3429 — to — 己亥年 (Earth Pig); 3637 or 3430
- Coptic calendar: 655–656
- Discordian calendar: 2105
- Ethiopian calendar: 931–932
- Hebrew calendar: 4699–4700
- Hindu calendars
- Vikram Samvat: 995–996
- Shaka Samvat: 860–861
- Kali Yuga: 4039–4040
- Holocene calendar: 10939
- Iranian calendar: 317–318
- Islamic calendar: 327–328
- Japanese calendar: Tengyō 2 (天慶２年)
- Javanese calendar: 839–840
- Julian calendar: 939; CMXXXIX
- Korean calendar: 3272
- Minguo calendar: 973 before ROC 民前973年
- Nanakshahi calendar: −529
- Seleucid era: 1250/1251 AG
- Thai solar calendar: 1481–1482
- Tibetan calendar: ས་ཕོ་ཁྱི་ལོ་ (male Earth-Dog); 1065 or 684 or −88 — to — ས་མོ་ཕག་ལོ་ (female Earth-Boar); 1066 or 685 or −87

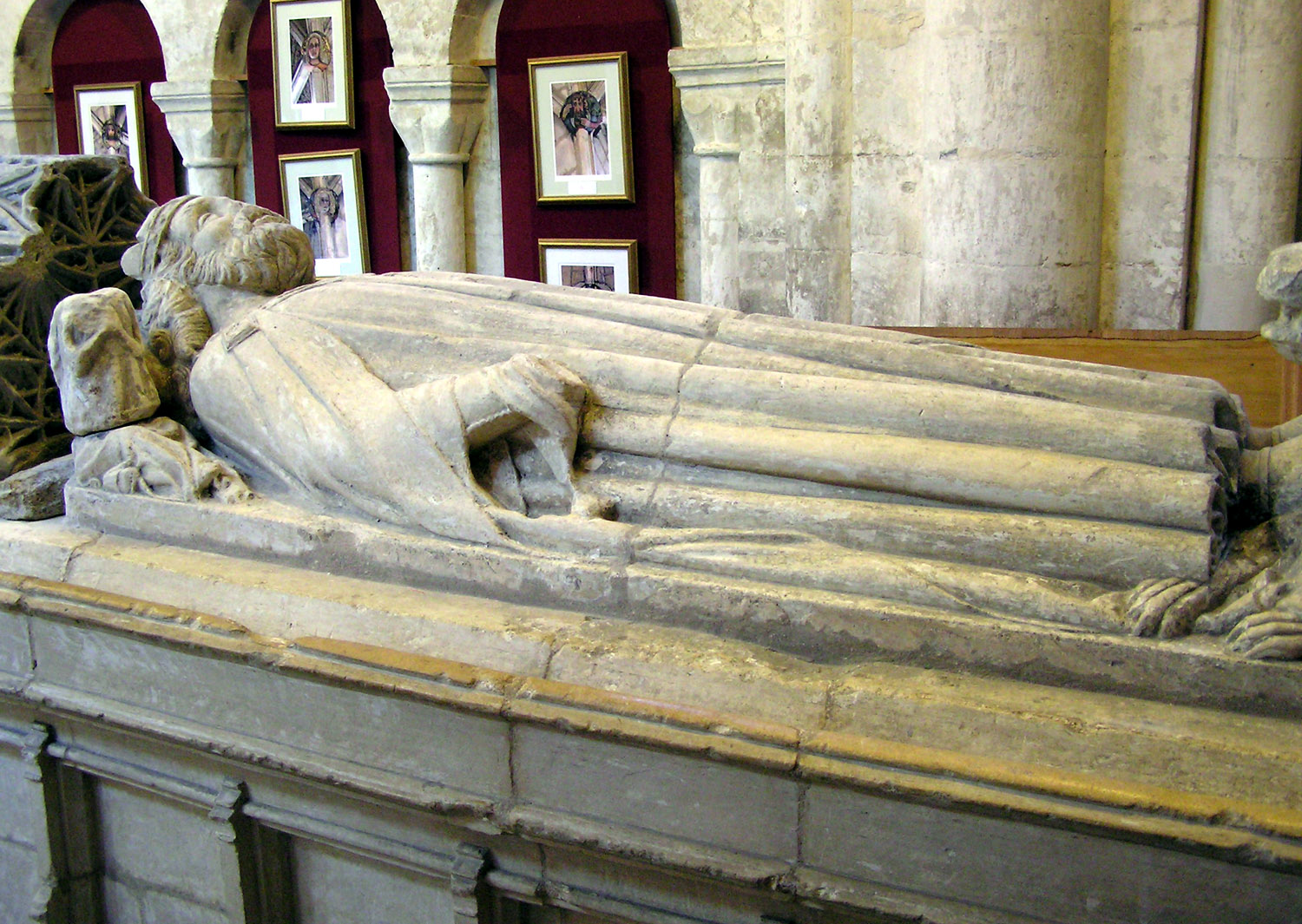
The tomb of King Æthelstan (c. 894–939).

Year 939 (CMXXXIX) was a common year starting on Tuesday of the Julian calendar.

== Events ==
=== By place ===
==== Europe ====
- Hugh the Great, count of Paris, rebels against King Louis IV ("d'Outremer") and gains support from William I, duke of Normandy. Hugh, along with Herbert II, count of Vermandois, Arnulf I, count of Flanders and William pay homage to King Otto I (ruler of the East Frankish Kingdom), and support him in his struggle against Louis.
- July 19 – Battle of Simancas: Caliph Abd-al-Rahman III of Córdoba claims a Jihad ('Holy War') and raises an army of 100,000 men to end the Kingdom of León. He razes the cities of Medina del Campo, Ìscar and Alcazarén (previously abandoned by their population) and finally, reaches the city of Simancas (near modern-day Valladolid), where Christian forces under King Ramiro II wait for him. After three days, Ramiro defeats the Moorish army with an alliance of Castile and Navarre. Abd-al-Rahman orders a retreat along the Duero River, and is almost killed, due, most likely, to treason by Arab elements in the Moorish army.
- August 1 – Battle of Trans-la-Forêt: Bretons defeat Viking occupiers.
- August 5 – Battle of Alhandic: Abd-al-Rahman III defeats the garrison of those loyal to Ramiro II at Zamora, in the context of the Spanish Reconquista.
- October 2 – Battle of Andernach: Otto I crushes a rebellion against his rule, by a coalition of Eberhard III, duke of Franconia, and other Frankish dukes, in Andernach on the Rhine River. Otto prevails, with support from Odo of Wetterau. Eberhard is killed while Gilbert, duke of Lotharingia (or Lorraine) drowns when trying to escape.

==== England ====
- October 27 – King Æthelstan dies at Gloucester after a 15-year reign. He is buried at Malmesbury Abbey and succeeded by his half-brother, Edmund I ("the Magnificent"). After Æthelstan's death Olaf Guthfrithson (or his cousin, Anlaf Cuaran) a Viking leader who rules Dublin, is proclaimed king of York (south of Northumbria).

==== Asia ====
- Taira no Masakado, a Japanese nobleman, leads one of the largest insurgent forces in the Heian period against the imperial court at Kyoto. Masakado has acquired enough power to govern the Kantō region (northwest of Edo) and calls himself the 'new emperor' (shinnō).
- Ngô Quyền, who the previous year defeated the Chinese at the Battle of Bạch Đằng (938) thereby regaining Vietnamese independence after 1000 years, becomes king of Vietnam.

=== By topic ===
==== Religion ====
- July 13 – Pope Leo VII dies at Rome after a 3½-year reign. He is succeeded by Stephen VIII as the 127th pope of the Catholic Church.
- The Major Occultation (or Al-Ghaybah al-Kubra) of Muhammad al-Mahdi occurs (approximate date).

== Births ==
- November 20 – Tai Zong, emperor of the Song dynasty (d. 997)
- Fujiwara no Takamitsu, Japanese waka poet (approximate date)
- Hai Gaon, Jewish theologian and rabbi (d. 1038)

== Deaths ==
- January 21 – Yang Pu, emperor of Wu (b. 900)
- May 25 – Yao Yanzhang, general of Chu
- July 13 – Leo VII, pope of the Catholic Church
- August 29
  - Li Chunyan, empress of Min (Ten Kingdoms)
  - Wang Jipeng, emperor of Min
- October 2
  - Eberhard III, duke of Franconia
  - Gilbert, duke of Lotharingia
- October 27 – Æthelstan, king of England
- November 28 – Lady Ma, Chinese noblewoman (b. 890)
- Ali ibn Babawayh Qummi, Twelver Shi'a scholar
- Ashot the Swift, prince of Tao-Klarjeti (Georgia)
- Pietro II Candiano, doge of Venice
