= Conrad Kurzbold =

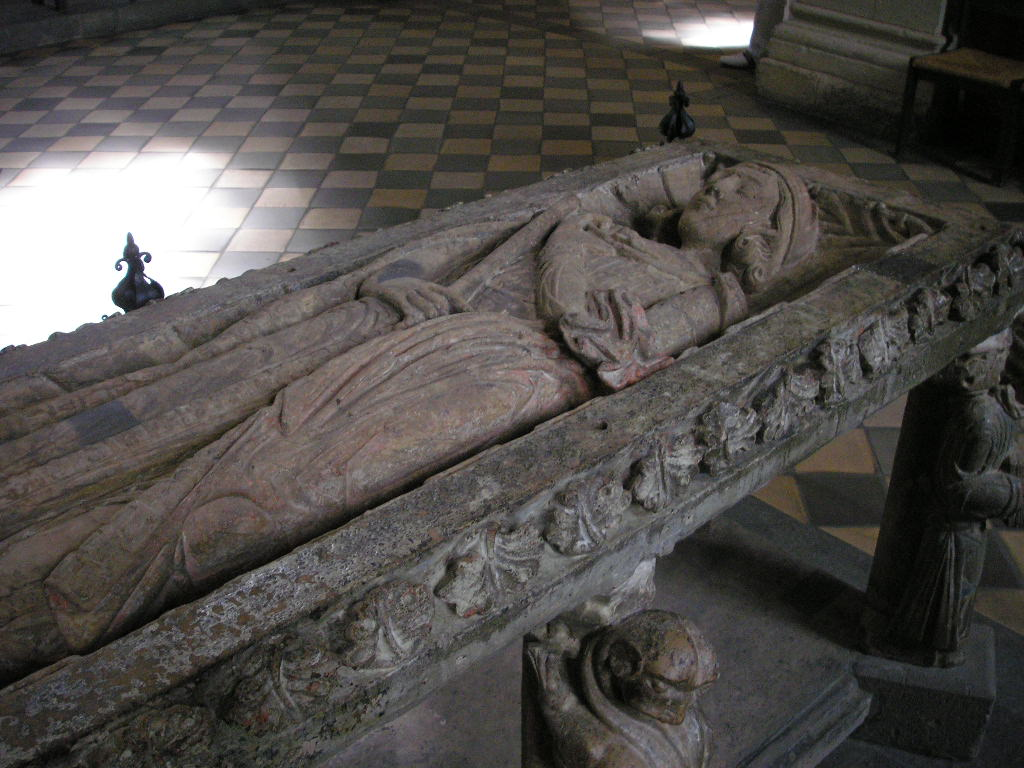
Tomb of Conrad Kurzbold in Limburg Cathedral consisting of a sculpture lying on a table, under which the remains are buried

Conrad (* ca. 885–890; † probably June 30, 948), called Conrad Kurzbold (literally "short-bold") in order to distinguish him from other members of the Conradine dynasty, was Count of Lower Lahngau (Limburg Basin and surrounding areas) and a retainer of East Francian kings Louis the Child, Henry the Fowler, and Holy Roman Emperor Otto the Great. He was a cousin of King Conrad the Younger and founded the Stift of St George in Limburg, around which the city of Limburg an der Lahn developed.

== Life ==
Conrad Kurzbold, who probably earned his nickname due to his rather short stature among the rest of the nobility (though only slightly below average compared to the general population) as well as his great bravery, was first mentioned in February of 910. In this year, Louis the Child transferred a farm located on Lintburk (or lintpurc) mountain to Conrad so that he could build a church on the site.

Conrad's parents were Eberhard, Count of Lower Lahngau, and his wife Wiltrud. He most likely grew up in the Duchy of Franconia. After the death of her husband in 902, Wiltrud fled with her sons to the territory of Eberhard's brothers near the mouth of the River Lahn. In Lower Lahngau, Conrad succeeded his father as count, but could only exercise partial rights in the surrounding regions.

After the end of King Conrad the Younger's reign in 918, Conrad Kurzbold seems to have had a good relationship with his successor, Henry the Fowler, though, unlike his cousin, Kurzbold was no longer guaranteed court service.

Conrad's historically significant achievement was his victory at the Battle of Andernach on October 2, 939, in which he, together with his cousin Odo of Wetterau defeated the dukes Eberhard of Franconia (a cousin of Conrad and Odo) and Gilbert of Lorraine, who were in revolt against Otto the Great. With the greater part of their army already across the Rhine at Andernach, the two dukes were still plundering in the counties of the two royalist Conradines when Conrad and Odo attacked. Eberhard fell in battle, while Gilbert drowned in the Rhine as he attempted to flee. Because of this victory, which ended the revolt against him, Otto granted Conrad Kurzbold an estate on which to found the Stift of St George in Limburg. In addition, Otto bestowed several positions at court to Conrad, some of which were already in his possession prior to 939.

Because of his military service and his small stature, Conrad Kurzbold became legendary. According to accounts by Ekkehard IV of the Abbey of Saint Gall, Kurzbold was a new David, who had single-handedly slain a huge, boastful Slav. In another story, Kurzbold had been on the road with Otto the Great when the party was attacked by a ferocious lion, which Kurzbold promptly dispatched before the king had even drawn his sword.

These accounts from Ekkehard, nearly 100 years after Conrad's death, remark upon Kurzbold's, "disgust for women and apples," a claim that is repeated again and again in the local chronicles, though Wolf-Heino Struck interprets this as a reference to Conrad's long remaining a bachelor. Additionally, in the contemporary discussions around celibacy, the clergy warned against sin using an apple to represent the fall of man, so perhaps it was not intended to be taken literally.

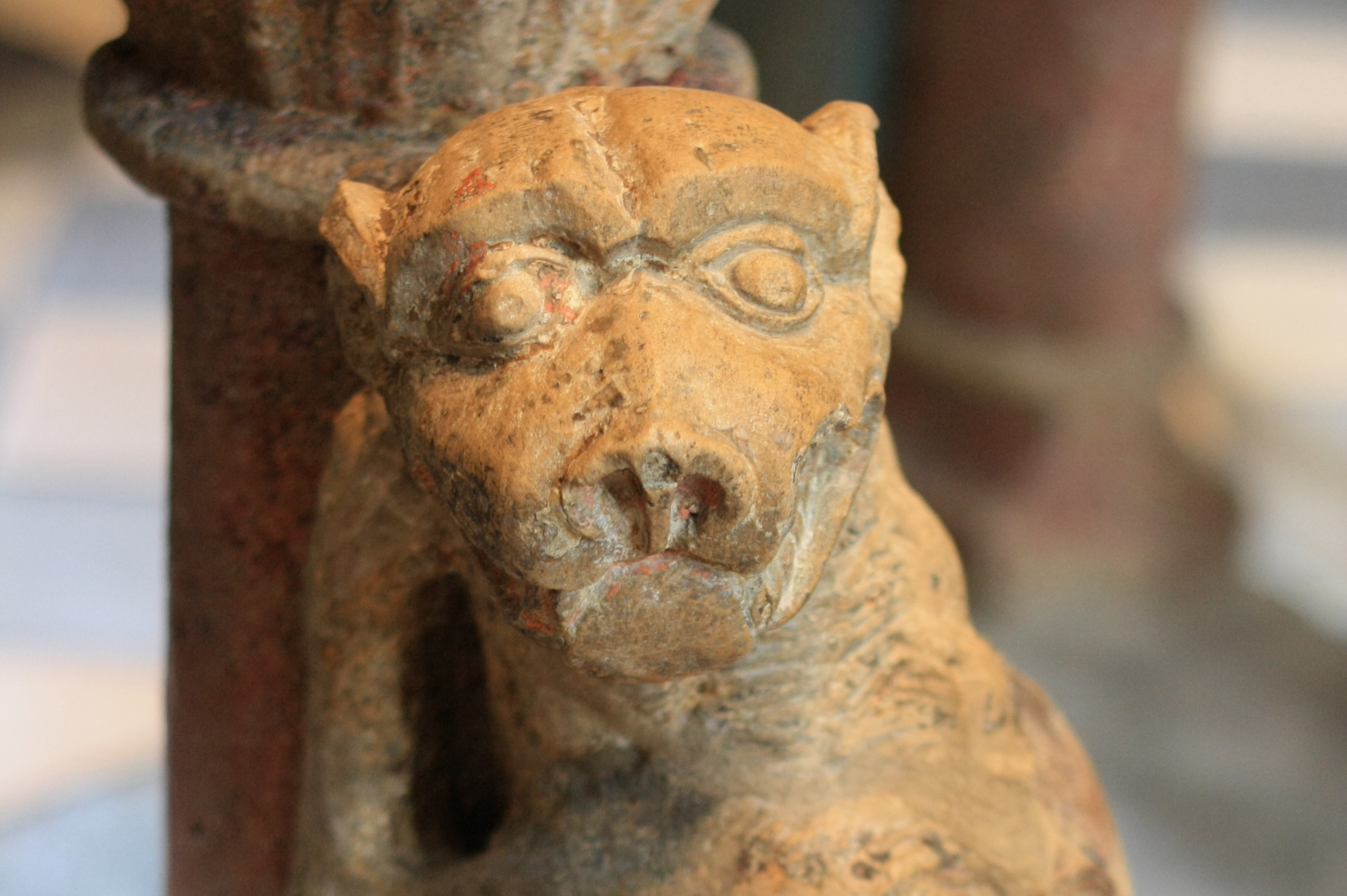
Lion at the grave of Conrad Kurzbold

Conrad Kurzbold died in 948 and was succeeded by his brother as count. He was interred beneath the choir of Limburg Cathedral, which he had founded. As a result of changes made by the Second Vatican Council, the table tomb constructed for his grave in 1235 was initially moved to the gallery of Limburg Cathedral, before it found its final home in the northern transept. The gravestone, in the form of a tabletop, is sculpted to resemble an open coffin. The recumbent figure represents Conrad surrounded by acanthus foliage. The figure appears youthful—around 30 years old—a Christological allusion to the life and immortality of the founder. The feet of the table tomb rest on a base plate, under which the remains are buried. As the death records of Fulda record the date of Conrad Kurzbold's death as the 2nd calends of July (i.e. June 30th), a mass is held at Limburger Cathedral every year on that date in remembrance of the church's founder, though he was never beatified.
