= October 2 =

October 2 this year in various calendars
- Friday, 2 October 2026
Akan	Fofie
Armenian	14 Sahmi 1476
Aztec	Nēmontēmi 5, 6 Ācatl
Babylonian	19 Ululu, 2337 SE
Balinese pawukon	Luang, Pepet, Pasah, Jaya, Paing, Tungleh, Sukra of Ugu, Guru, Urungan, Manuh
Bengali	17 Ashshin, BS 1433
Chinese	Yin Earth Rooster・Bond Mansion; Fire Horse Year, Month 8, Day 22 (Qiufen, 6 days until Hanlu)
Common Era	2 October 2026 CE
Coptic	22 Thout, AM 1743
Egyptian	19 Mechir, 2775 NE
Ethiopian	22 Maskaram, 2019 Amätä Məhrät
French Republican	Décade I, Décadi de Vendémiaire de l'Année 235 de la République
Gregorian	2 October, AD 2026
Hebrew	21 Tishrei, AM 5787
Hindu	Rohiṇi・Siddhi; Solar: 16 Āśvina, 1948 SE; Lunisolar: Ṣaṣṭhī, Kṛishna pakṣa of Bhādrapada, 2083 VE; Rāudra・5127 KY・1,872,850
Icelandic	Föstudagur, 9 Haustmánuður 2026
Islamic	19 Rabi' al-thani, AH 1448 (using tabular method)
ISO week date	2026-W40-5
Japanese	22 Hazuki, Reiwa 8 (Shūbun, 6 days until Kanro)
Julian	19 September, AD 2026 (AM 7534)
Julian day	2461316
Korean	22 Dakdal, 4359 DE
Maya	13.0.13.17.13; 6 Yax, 6 Ben
Roman	ante diem XIII Kalendas Octobres, MMDCCLXXIX AUC
Solar Hijri	10 Mehr, SH 1405
Tibetan	21 khrums, me pho rta 2153 or 1772 or 1000

<<	October					>>
Su	Mo	Tu	We	Th	Fr	Sa
				1	2	3
4	5	6	7	8	9	10
11	12	13	14	15	16	17
18	19	20	21	22	23	24
25	26	27	28	29	30	31
2026

October 2 in recent years
2026 (Friday)
2025 (Thursday)
2024 (Wednesday)
2023 (Monday)
2022 (Sunday)
2021 (Saturday)
2020 (Friday)
2019 (Wednesday)
2018 (Tuesday)
2017 (Monday)

October 2 is the 275th day of the year (276th in leap years) in the Gregorian calendar; 90 days remain until the end of the year.

== Events ==
=== Pre-1600 ===
- 48 BC – Julius Caesar arrives in Ptolemaic Egypt in his pursuit of Pompey and learns of the latter's death.
- 811 – Michael I Rangabe is proclaimed as Byzantine Emperor, forcing the rival claimant Staurakios to abdicate his claim.
- 829 – Theophilos succeeds his father Michael II as Byzantine Emperor.
- 939 – Battle of Andernach: Otto I, Holy Roman Emperor, crushes a rebellion against his rule, by a coalition of Eberhard of Franconia and other Frankish dukes.
- 1187– Saladin wins Jerusalem after the city surrendered to his forces following a prolonged siege.
- 1263 – The Battle of Largs is fought between Norwegians and Scots.
- 1470 – The Earl of Warwick's rebellion forces King Edward IV of England to flee to the Netherlands, restoring Henry VI to the throne.
- 1552 – Russo-Kazan Wars: Russian troops enter Kazan.

=== 1601–1900 ===
- 1766 - The Nottingham Cheese Riot breaks out at the Goose Fair in Nottingham, UK, in response to the excessive cost of cheese.
- 1780 – American Revolutionary War: John André, a British Army officer, is hanged as a spy by the Continental Army.
- 1789 – The United States Bill of Rights is sent to the various States for ratification.
- 1835 – Texas Revolution: Mexican troops attempt to disarm the people of Gonzales, but encounter stiff resistance from a hastily assembled militia.
- 1864 – American Civil War: Confederates defeat a Union attack on Saltville, Virginia. A massacre of wounded Union prisoners ensues.
- 1870 – By plebiscite, the citizens of the Papal States accept annexation by the Kingdom of Italy.

=== 1901–present ===
- 1919 – Seven days after suffering a "physical collapse" following a speech in Pueblo, Colorado, U.S. president Woodrow Wilson has a catastrophic stroke at the White House, leaving him physically and mentally incapacitated for the remainder of his presidency.
- 1920 – Ukrainian War of Independence: Mikhail Frunze orders the Red Army to immediately cease hostilities with the Revolutionary Insurgent Army of Ukraine.
- 1928 – The "Prelature of the Holy Cross and the Work of God", commonly known as Opus Dei, is founded.
- 1937 – Rafael Trujillo orders the execution of Haitians living in the border region of the Dominican Republic.
- 1942 – World War II: Ocean Liner RMS Queen Mary accidentally rams and sinks HMS Curacoa, killing over 300 crewmen aboard Curacoa.
- 1944 – World War II: German troops end the Warsaw Uprising.
- 1958 – Guinea declares its independence from France.
- 1967 – Thurgood Marshall is sworn in as the first African-American justice of the United States Supreme Court.
- 1968 – Mexican President Gustavo Díaz Ordaz orders soldiers to suppress a demonstration of unarmed students, ten days before the start of the 1968 Summer Olympics.
- 1970 – An aircraft carrying the Wichita State University football team, administrators, and supporters crashes in Colorado, killing 31 people.
- 1971 – South Vietnamese President Nguyen Van Thieu is re-elected in a one-man election.
- 1971 – British European Airways Flight 706 crashes near Aarsele, Belgium, killing 63.
- 1980 – Michael Myers becomes the first member of either chamber of Congress to be expelled since the Civil War.
- 1990 – Xiamen Airlines Flight 8301 is hijacked and lands at Guangzhou, where it crashes into two other airliners on the ground, killing 132.
- 1992 – Military police storm the Carandiru Penitentiary in São Paulo, Brazil during a prison riot. The resulting massacre leaves 111 prisoners dead.
- 1996 – Aeroperú Flight 603 crashes into the ocean near Peru, killing all 70 people on board.
- 1996 – The Electronic Freedom of Information Act Amendments are signed by U.S. President Bill Clinton.
- 2002 – The Beltway sniper attacks begin in Washington, D.C., extending over three weeks and killing 10 people.
- 2004 – The first parkrun, then known as the Bushy Park Time Trial, takes place in Bushy Park, London, UK.
- 2006 – Five Amish girls are murdered in a shooting at a school in Pennsylvania, United States.
- 2007 – President Roh Moo-hyun of South Korea goes to North Korea for an Inter-Korean summit with North Korean leader Kim Jong-il.
- 2016 – Ethiopian protests break out during a festival in the Oromia region, killing dozens of people.
- 2018 – The Washington Post journalist Jamal Khashoggi is assassinated in the Saudi consulate in Istanbul, Turkey.
- 2019 – A privately owned Boeing B-17 Flying Fortress conducting a living history exhibition flight crashes shortly after takeoff from Windsor Locks, Connecticut, killing seven.
- 2025 – 2 people are killed and at least 4 others injured in an attack on a synagogue in Manchester, UK, during Yom Kippur.

== Births ==
=== Pre-1600 ===
- 1452 – Richard III of England (died 1485)
- 1470 – Isabella of Aragon, Queen of Portugal, Daughter of Isabella I of Castile and Ferdinand II of Aragon (died 1498)
- 1527 – William Drury, English politician (died 1579)
- 1538 – Charles Borromeo, Italian cardinal and saint (died 1584)

=== 1601–1900 ===
- 1718 – Elizabeth Montagu, English author and critic (died 1800)
- 1768 – William Beresford, 1st Viscount Beresford, English general and politician (died 1854)
- 1798 – Charles Albert, King of Sardinia (1831–49) (died 1849)
- 1800 – Nat Turner, American slave and uprising leader (died 1831)
- 1815 – James Agnew, Irish-Australian politician, Premier of Tasmania (died 1901)
- 1821 – Alexander P. Stewart, American general (died 1908)
- 1828 – Charles Floquet, French lawyer and politician, Prime Minister of France (died 1896)
- 1832 – Edward Burnett Tylor, English anthropologist (died 1917)
- 1847 – Paul von Hindenburg, German field marshal and politician, 2nd President of Germany (died 1934)
- 1851 – Ferdinand Foch, French field marshal (died 1929)
- 1852 – William Ramsay, Scottish chemist and academic, Nobel Prize laureate (died 1916)
- 1854 – Patrick Geddes, Scottish biologist, sociologist, geographer, and philanthropist (died 1932)
- 1866 – Swami Abhedananda, Indian mystic and philosopher (died 1939)
- 1869 – Mahatma Gandhi, Indian freedom fighter, activist and philosopher (died 1948)
- 1871 – Cordell Hull, American politician, United States Secretary of State, Nobel Prize laureate (died 1955)
- 1871 – Martha Brookes Hutcheson, American landscaper and author (died 1959)
- 1873 – Stephen Warfield Gambrill, American lawyer and politician (died 1924)
- 1873 – Pelham Warner, English cricketer and manager (died 1963)
- 1875 – Pattie Ruffner Jacobs, American suffragist (died 1935)
- 1879 – Wallace Stevens, American poet (died 1955)
- 1882 – Boris Shaposhnikov, Russian colonel (died 1945)
- 1883 – Karl von Terzaghi, Austrian geologist and engineer (died 1963)
- 1890 – Groucho Marx, American comedian and actor (died 1977)
- 1893 – Leroy Shield, American composer and conductor (died 1962)
- 1895 – Ruth Cheney Streeter, American colonel (died 1990)
- 1897 – Bud Abbott, American comedian, actor, and producer. (died 1974)
- 1900 – Leela Roy Nag, Indian freedom fighter, social reformer and politician (died 1970)

=== 1901–present ===
- 1902 – Leopold Figl, Austrian politician, Chancellor of Austria (died 1965)
- 1904 – Graham Greene, English novelist, playwright, and critic (died 1991)
- 1904 – Lal Bahadur Shastri, Indian and politician, Prime Minister of India (died 1966)
- 1905 – Franjo Šeper, Croatian cardinal (died 1981)
- 1906 – Thomas Hollway, Australian politician, Premier of Victoria (died 1971)
- 1907 – Víctor Paz Estenssoro, Bolivian politician, President of Bolivia (died 2001)
- 1907 – Alexander R. Todd, Scottish biochemist and academic, Nobel Prize laureate (died 1997)
- 1909 – Alex Raymond, American cartoonist, creator of Flash Gordon (died 1956)
- 1912 – Frank Malina, American engineer and painter (died 1981)
- 1914 – Jack Parsons, American chemist, occultist, and engineer (died 1952)
- 1914 – Bernarr Rainbow, English organist, conductor, and historian (died 1998)
- 1915 – Chuck Williams, American author and businessman, founded Williams Sonoma (died 2015)
- 1917 – Christian de Duve, Belgian cytologist and biochemist, Nobel Prize laureate (died 2013)
- 1917 – Charles Drake, American actor (died 1994)
- 1919 – John W. Duarte, English guitarist and composer (died 2004)
- 1921 – Edmund Crispin, English writer and composer (died 1978)
- 1921 – Albert Scott Crossfield, American pilot and engineer (died 2006)
- 1921 – Robert Runcie, English archbishop (died 2000)
- 1925 – Wren Blair, Canadian ice hockey player, coach, and manager (died 2013)
- 1926 – Jan Morris, Welsh historian and author (died 2020)
- 1928 – George McFarland, American actor (died 1993)
- 1928 – Wolfhart Pannenberg, Polish-German theologian and academic (died 2014)
- 1929 – Peter Bronfman, Canadian businessman (died 1996)
- 1929 – Moses Gunn, American actor (died 1993)
- 1930 – Dave Barrett, Canadian social worker and politician, 26th Premier of British Columbia (died 2018)
- 1932 – Maury Wills, American baseball player and manager (died 2022)
- 1933 – John Gurdon, English biologist and academic, Nobel Prize laureate (died 2025)
- 1933 – Dave Somerville, Canadian singer (died 2015)
- 1934 – Richard Scott, Baron Scott of Foscote, English lawyer and judge
- 1934 – Earl Wilson, American baseball player (died 2005)
- 1935 – Omar Sívori, Italian-Argentine footballer and manager (died 2005)
- 1936 – Dick Barnett, American basketball player (died 2025)
- 1936 – Connie Dierking, American basketball player (died 2013)
- 1936 – Gwen Marston, American quilter and writer (died 2019)
- 1937 – Johnnie Cochran, American lawyer (died 2005)
- 1938 – Nick Gravenites, American singer-songwriter (died 2024)
- 1938 – Waheed Murad, Pakistani actor, producer, and screenwriter (died 1983)
- 1938 – Rex Reed, American film critic (died 2026)
- 1939 – Budhi Kunderan, Indian cricketer (died 2006)
- 1941 – Diana Hendry, English poet and author
- 1941 – Ron Meagher, American rock bass player
- 1942 – Steve Sabol, American director and producer, co-founded NFL Films (died 2012)
- 1943 – Anna Ford, English journalist
- 1943 – Henri Szeps, Australian actor (died 2025)
- 1944 – Vernor Vinge, American author (died 2024)
- 1945 – Martin Hellman, American cryptographer and academic
- 1945 – Don McLean, American singer-songwriter
- 1946 – Sonthi Boonyaratglin, Thai general and politician
- 1947 – Ward Churchill, American author and activist (died 2026)
- 1948 – Trevor Brooking, English footballer and manager
- 1948 – Avery Brooks, American actor
- 1948 – Donna Karan, American fashion designer, founded DKNY
- 1948 – Siim Kallas, Estonian politician, Prime Minister of Estonia (died 2026)
- 1948 – Persis Khambatta, Indian model and actress, (died 1998)
- 1949 – Richard Hell, American singer-songwriter and bass player
- 1949 – Annie Leibovitz, American photographer
- 1950 – Mike Rutherford, English guitarist
- 1951 – Sting, English singer-songwriter and actor
- 1952 – Janusz Olejniczak, Polish classical pianist and actor (died 2024)
- 1952 – Robin Riker, American actress
- 1953 – Vanessa Bell Armstrong, American singer
- 1953 – Tom Boswell, American basketball player
- 1954 – Lorraine Bracco, American actress
- 1955 – Philip Oakey, English singer-songwriter, keyboard player, and producer
- 1956 – Freddie Jackson, American soul singer (died 2026)
- 1957 – John Cook, American golfer
- 1957 – Wade Dooley, English rugby player
- 1958 – Robbie Nevil, American singer-songwriter
- 1960 – Glenn Anderson, Canadian ice hockey player
- 1960 – Django Bates, English musician and composer
- 1960 – Joe Sacco, Maltese-American journalist and cartoonist
- 1960 – Dereck Whittenburg, American basketball player and coach
- 1962 – Mark Rypien, Canadian-American football player
- 1963 – Keith Bradshaw, Australian cricketer
- 1963 – Maria Ressa, Filipino-American journalist
- 1964 – Dirk Brinkmann, German field hockey player
- 1965 – Darren Cahill, Australian tennis player
- 1965 – Tom Moody, Australian cricketer
- 1965 – Ferhan and Ferzan Önder, Turkish-Austrian pianists
- 1966 – Yokozuna, American wrestler (died 2000)
- 1967 – Frankie Fredericks, Namibian sprinter
- 1967 – Alex Karp, American businessman
- 1967 – Thomas Muster, Austrian tennis player
- 1967 – Gillian Welch, American singer-songwriter and guitarist
- 1968 – Jana Novotná, Czech tennis player and sportscaster (died 2017)
- 1968 – Joey Slotnick, American actor
- 1968 – Glen Wesley, Canadian ice hockey player
- 1968 – Kelly Willis, American country music singer-songwriter
- 1969 – Badly Drawn Boy, English musician
- 1970 – Eddie Guardado, American baseball player
- 1970 – Patricia O'Callaghan, Canadian soprano
- 1970 – Kelly Ripa, American actress and talk show host
- 1970 – Maribel Verdú, Spanish actress
- 1971 – Tiffany Darwish, American singer-songwriter
- 1971 – Jim Root, American guitarist and songwriter
- 1971 – Chris Savino, American comic book artist, writer, animator and creator of The Loud House
- 1972 – Aaron McKie, American basketball player
- 1973 – Melissa Harris-Perry, American journalist, author, and educator
- 1973 – Lene Nystrøm, Norwegian singer, songwriter, and musician
- 1973 – Efren Ramirez, American actor
- 1973 – Scott Schoeneweis, American baseball player
- 1974 – Bjarke Ingels, Danish architect
- 1974 – Sam Roberts, Canadian singer-songwriter and musician
- 1974 – Paul Teutul Jr., American motorcycle designer, co-founded Orange County Choppers
- 1976 – Mark Chilton, English cricketer
- 1977 – Didier Défago, Swiss skier
- 1978 – Ayumi Hamasaki, Japanese singer, songwriter, actress
- 1981 – Luke Wilkshire, Australian footballer
- 1982 – Tyson Chandler, American basketball player
- 1982 – Esra Gümüş, Turkish volleyball player
- 1984 – Marion Bartoli, French tennis player
- 1985 – Çağlar Birinci, Turkish footballer
- 1986 – Camilla Belle, American actress
- 1987 – Joe Ingles, Australian basketball player
- 1987 – Phil Kessel, American ice hockey player
- 1987 – Ricky Stenhouse Jr., American race car driver
- 1988 – Brittany Howard, American singer-songwriter and guitarist
- 1989 – Frederik Andersen, Danish ice hockey player
- 1989 – Josh Bailey, Canadian ice hockey player
- 1989 – Aaron Hicks, American baseball player
- 1989 – George Nash, English rower
- 1990 – Samantha Barks, Manx actress and singer
- 1991 – Roberto Firmino, Brazilian footballer
- 1992 – Alisson Becker, Brazilian footballer
- 1992 – Shane Larkin, American-Turkish basketball player
- 1992 – Nicol Ruprecht, Austrian rhythmic gymnast
- 1993 – Lance McCullers Jr., American baseball player
- 1995 – Tepai Moeroa, Cook Islands rugby league player
- 1996 – Tom Trbojevic, Australian rugby league player
- 2000 – Quadeca, American singer-songwriter and YouTuber
- 2002 – Jacob Sartorius, American social media personality and singer
- 2005 – Sam Konstas, Australian cricketer

== Deaths ==
=== Pre-1600 ===
- 534 – Athalaric, king of the Ostrogoths in Italy
- 829 – Michael II, Byzantine emperor
- 939 – Eberhard of Franconia
- 939 – Gilbert, Duke of Lorraine
- 1264 – Pope Urban IV (born c. 1200)
- 1559 – Jacquet of Mantua, French-Italian composer (born 1483)

=== 1601–1900 ===
- 1626 – Diego Sarmiento de Acuña, 1st Count of Gondomar, Spanish academic and diplomat (born 1567)
- 1629 – Antonio Cifra, Italian composer (born 1584)
- 1629 – Pierre de Bérulle, French cardinal and theologian (born 1575)
- 1674 – George Frederick of Nassau-Siegen, officer in the Dutch Army (born 1606)
- 1678 – Wu Sangui, Qing Chinese general (born 1612)
- 1708 – Anne Jules de Noailles, French general (born 1650)
- 1709 – Ivan Mazepa, Ukrainian diplomat (born 1639)
- 1724 – François-Timoléon de Choisy, French historian and author (born 1644)
- 1746 – Josiah Burchett, English admiral and politician (born 1666)
- 1764 – William Cavendish, 4th Duke of Devonshire, English politician, Prime Minister of the United Kingdom (born 1720)
- 1780 – John André, English soldier (born 1750)
- 1782 – Charles Lee, English-born American general (born 1732)
- 1786 – Augustus Keppel, 1st Viscount Keppel, English admiral and politician (born 1725)
- 1803 – Samuel Adams, American politician, Governor of Massachusetts (born 1722)
- 1804 – Nicolas-Joseph Cugnot, French engineer (born 1725)
- 1847 – Vasil Aprilov, Bulgarian educator, merchant and writer (born 1789)
- 1850 – Sarah Biffen, English painter (born 1784)
- 1853 – François Arago, French mathematician, physicist, astronomer, and politician (born 1786)

=== 1901–present ===
- 1920 – Max Bruch, German composer and conductor (born 1838)
- 1927 – Svante Arrhenius, Swedish physicist and chemist, Nobel Prize laureate (born 1859)
- 1938 – Alexandru Averescu, Romanian military leader and politician, 24th Prime Minister of Romania (born 1859)
- 1943 – John Evans, English-Australian politician, 21st Premier of Tasmania (born 1855)
- 1953 – John Marin, American painter (born 1870)
- 1953 – Émilie Busquant, French anarcho-syndicalist, sewed the first Flag of Algeria (born 1901)
- 1955 – William R. Orthwein, American swimmer and water polo player (born 1881)
- 1968 – Marcel Duchamp, French painter and sculptor (born 1887)
- 1971 – Jessie Arms Botke, American painter (born 1883)
- 1973 – Paul Hartman, American actor and dancer (born 1904)
- 1973 – Paavo Nurmi, Finnish runner (born 1897)
- 1974 – Vasily Shukshin, Russian actor, director, and screenwriter (born 1929)
- 1975 – K. Kamaraj, Indian lawyer and politician (born 1903)
- 1981 – Harry Golden, American journalist and author (born 1902)
- 1981 – Hazel Scott, Trinidadian-American activist, actress, and musician (born 1920)
- 1985 – Rock Hudson, American actor (born 1925)
- 1987 – Madeleine Carroll, English actress (born 1906)
- 1987 – Peter Medawar, Brazilian-English biologist and zoologist, Nobel Prize laureate (born 1915)
- 1988 – Alec Issigonis, English car designer, designed the Mini (born 1906)
- 1988 – Hamengkubuwono IX, Indonesian politician, 2nd vice president of Indonesia (born 1912)
- 1991 – Hazen Argue, Canadian politician (born 1921)
- 1991 – Demetrios I of Constantinople (born 1914)
- 1996 – Robert Bourassa, Canadian lawyer and politician, Premier of Quebec (born 1933)
- 1996 – Andrey Lukanov, Bulgarian politician, 40th Prime Minister of Bulgaria (born 1938)
- 1998 – Gene Autry, American actor, singer, and guitarist (born 1907)
- 1999 – Heinz G. Konsalik, German journalist and author (born 1921)
- 2000 – David Tonkin, Australian politician, Premier of South Australia (born 1929)
- 2001 – Franz Biebl, German composer and academic (born 1906)
- 2002 – Heinz von Foerster, Austrian-American physicist and philosopher (born 1911)
- 2003 – John Thomas Dunlop, American scholar and politician, United States Secretary of Labor (born 1914)
- 2005 – Nipsey Russell, American comedian and actor (born 1918)
- 2005 – August Wilson, American author and playwright (born 1945)
- 2006 – Helen Chenoweth-Hage, American politician (born 1938)
- 2006 – Paul Halmos, Hungarian-American mathematician (born 1916)
- 2007 – Tex Coulter, American football player (born 1924)
- 2007 – George Grizzard, American actor (born 1928)
- 2007 – Dan Keating, Irish Republican Army volunteer (born 1902)
- 2010 – Kwa Geok Choo, Singaporean lawyer and scholar (born 1920)
- 2012 – Nguyễn Chí Thiện, Vietnamese-American poet and activist (born 1939)
- 2012 – Charles Roach, Trinidadian-Canadian lawyer and activist (born 1933)
- 2012 – J. Philippe Rushton, English-Canadian psychologist, theorist, academic (born 1943)
- 2013 – Abraham Nemeth, American mathematician and academic (born 1918)
- 2014 – Robert Flower, Australian footballer (born 1955)
- 2015 – Brian Friel, Irish author, playwright, and director (born 1929)
- 2015 – Coleridge Goode, Jamaican-English bassist and composer (born 1914)
- 2015 – Johnny Paton, Scottish footballer and coach (born 1923)
- 2016 – Neville Marriner, British conductor (born 1924)
- 2017 – Tom Petty, American musician (born 1950)
- 2018 – Jamal Khashoggi, Saudi journalist (born 1958)
- 2020 – Anne-Marie Hutchinson, British lawyer (born 1957)
- 2021 – Jack Biondolillo, American bowler (born 1940)
- 2022 – Sacheen Littlefeather, American actress, model and activist for Native American civil rights (born 1946)
- 2023 – Francis Lee, English footballer (born 1944)
- 2024 – Susie Berning, American professional golfer (born 1941)
- 2024 – Marissa Haque, Indonesian politician (born 1962)

== Holidays and observances ==
- Batik Day (Indonesia)
- Christian feast day:
  - Blessed Antoine Chevrier
  - Denha I of Tikrit (Syriac Orthodox Church)
  - Blessed Jan Beyzym
  - Blessed Maria Antonina Kratochwil
  - Blessed María Francisca Ricart Olmos
  - Memorial of the Holy Guardian Angels
  - Leodegar
  - October 2 (Eastern Orthodox liturgics)
- Gandhi's birthday-related observances:
  - Gandhi Jayanti (India)
  - International Day of Non-Violence
- Independence Day, celebrates the independence of Guinea from France in 1958
- National Grandparents Day (Italy)
- International Day of Non-Violence
