= Henry I of Bavaria =

Duke of Bavaria from 948 to 955

Henry I
- Duke of Bavaria
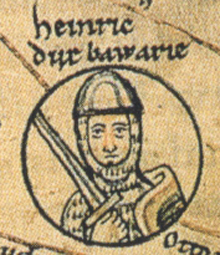
- Duke Henry of Bavaria in the pedigree of the Ottonian dynasty, Chronica sancti Pantaleonis, Cologne, 13th century
- Born: 919/921; Nordhausen, Thuringia
- Died: 1 November 955; Pöhlde Abbey, Saxony
- Spouse: Judith, Duchess of Bavaria
- Issue: Gerberga II, Abbess of Gandersheim; Hedwig, Duchess of Swabia; Henry II, Duke of Bavaria
- Dynasty: Ottonian
- Father: Henry the Fowler
- Mother: Matilda of Ringelheim

Henry I (919/921 – 1 November 955), a member of the German royal Ottonian dynasty, was Duke of Bavaria from 948 until his death.

== Life ==
He was the second son of the German king Henry the Fowler and his wife Matilda of Ringelheim. After the death of his father, the royal title passed to Henry's elder brother Otto I, who immediately had to face the indignation of several Saxon nobles. Moreover, the late king's son from his first marriage, Thankmar, revolted in alliance with Duke Eberhard of Franconia and had young Henry captured and arrested. While Thankmar was killed by his own henchmen in 938, Henry, in custody, chose to join the insurgents. In alliance with Duke Eberhard and Duke Gilbert of Lorraine he attempted a revolt against his elder brother King Otto in 938, believing he had a claim on the throne as firstborn son after King Henry's coronation in 919.

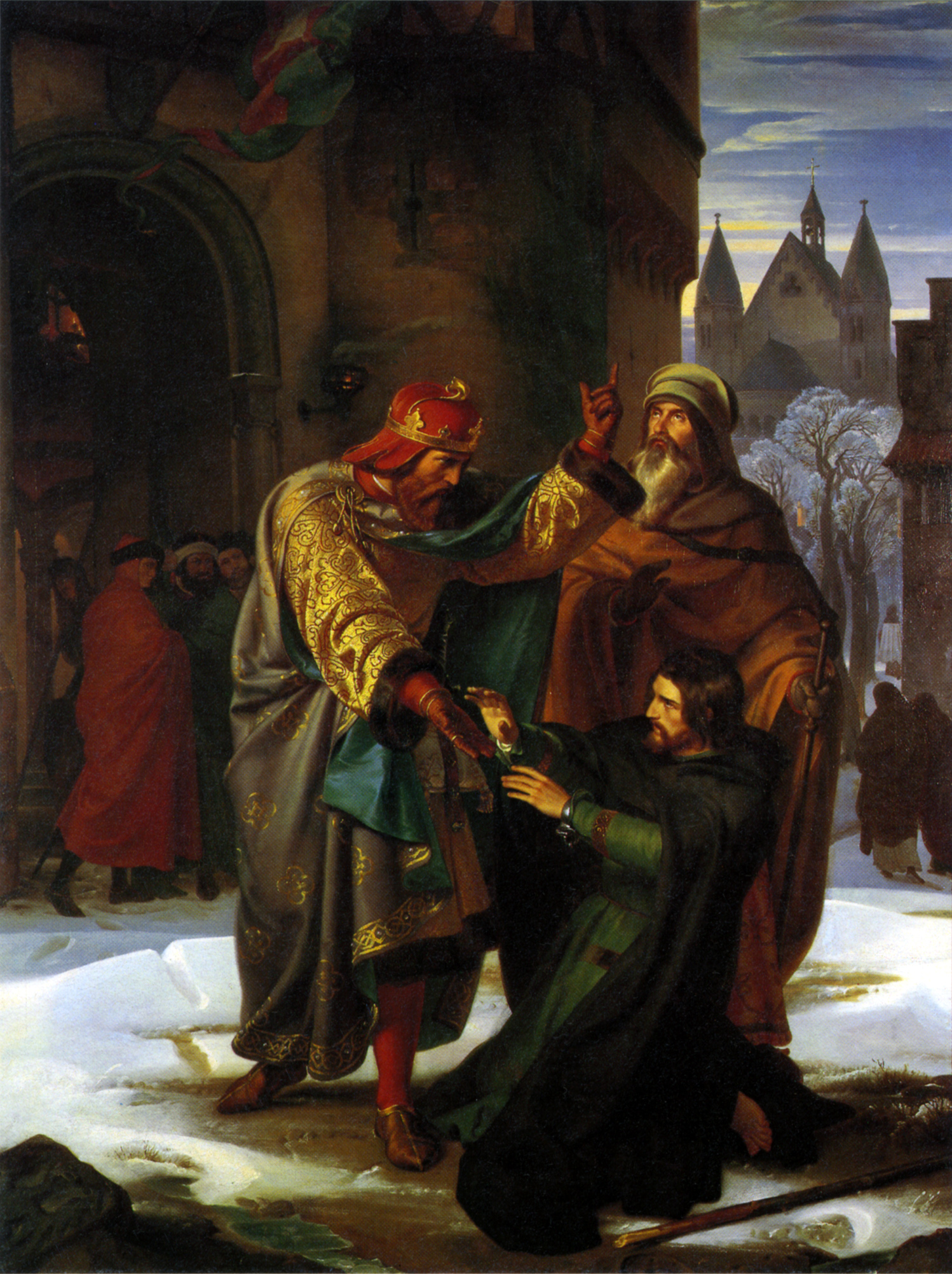
The Reconciliation of Otto the Great with his brother Henry, history painting by Alfred Rethel, 1840

In 939 Henry's forces were defeated at Birten (near Xanten) and he himself was wounded. Both his allies Duke Eberhard and Duke Gilbert were killed at the Battle of Andernach on 2 October. Henry fled, first to his sister Gerberga, widow of Duke Gilbert of Lorraine, later to the court of King Louis IV of France. When Otto's troops invaded Lorraine (Lotharingia) and marched against France, Henry returned and submitted to his elder brother. He and Otto were reconciled in 940, and Henry was awarded the Lotharingian duchy. However, he could not assert his authority in Lorraine against the local nobility tending to France, and as a result he was stripped of his position when the king appointed Count Otto of Verdun duke. Embittered Henry again plotted to assassinate King Otto in Easter 941 at the Imperial palace of Quedlinburg, but was discovered and put in captivity in Ingelheim, being released after doing penance at Christmas of that year.

Over the years, the relationship between the brothers improved. After the death of the Luitpolding duke Berthold of Bavaria, Otto, at the instigation of his mother Matilda, enfeoffed Henry with the Duchy of Bavaria in 948. Henry had ties to Bavaria through his marriage with Judith, a daughter of late Duke Arnulf. Though he was met with resistance by local nobles, he first defended, and then enlarged his duchy in wars with the Hungarians. In 951 he accompanied King Otto on his Italian campaign against King Berengar II and acted as matchmaker for his brother, when he brought Queen Adelaide to Pavia. In turn he received the newly established March of Verona with Friuli, Aquileia, and Istria at the 952 Imperial Diet in Augsburg. In 953–954 Henry, temporarily deserted by his Bavarian subjects, brutally suppressed a revolt by Otto's son, Duke Liudolf of Swabia and Duke Conrad of Lorraine.

While his brother gained a victory over the Hungarians in the Battle of Lechfeld, Henry fell ill in 955 and died on 1 November in Pöhlde Abbey. His son and heir was Henry II, Duke of Bavaria. He was laid to rest in the abbey of Niedermünster in Regensburg, Bavaria, where his wife Judith is also buried.

== Marriage and issue ==
Henry married Judith, daughter of Arnulf, Duke of Bavaria. They had:

- Gerberge, abbess to Gandersheim
- Hadwig, married to Burchard III, Duke of Swabia
- Henry II, Duke of Bavaria (v.951 † 995)

== Sources ==
- Bachrach, David S. (2012). Warfare in Tenth-Century Germany. The Boydell Press.
- Barraclough, Geoffrey, ed. (1961). Studies in Mediaeval History:Mediaeval Germany. Vol. II. Essays. Basil Blackwell.
- Bernhardt, John W. (1996). Itinerant Kingship and Royal Monasteries in Early Medieval Germany, C.936-1075. Cambridge University Press.
- Prutz, Hans (1905). The Age of Charlemagne. Lea Brothers & Company.
- Reuter, Timothy; McKitterick, Rosamond, eds. (1999). The New Cambridge Medieval History: Volume 3, C.900-c.1024. Cambridge University Press.

Henry I of Bavaria Ottonian dynasty (Liudolfings) Born: 919 Died: 1 November 955
Regnal titles
Preceded by Gilbert	Duke of Lotharingia; 940–941	Succeeded by Otto
Preceded by Berthold	Duke of Bavaria; 948–955	Succeeded by Henry II
New title	Margrave of Verona; 952–955	Succeeded by Henry II
