= Erhard von Appenweiler =

Erhard von Appenweiler (d. 1471 or 1472) was a 15th-century Basel chronicler and cleric. A native of Appenweiler near Colmar, his presence as chaplain at Basel Minster is recorded from 1429. He was made chamberlain at local commandery of the Order of Saint John in 1443. On the empty pages of Sächsische Weltchronik manuscript, he recorded the local history of Basel for the years 1439–1471, beginning with the election of Amadeus VIII of Savoy as Pope Felix V and the Armagnacs invasion. His chronicle has the character of informal notes and does not strictly follow chronological order, but it is of high value for the regional history of Basel for this period due to its rich detail.
