= Annales Palidenses =

12th-century Latin annals

The Annales Palidenses (German: Pöhlder Annalen or Pöhlder Chronik) are a set of medieval annals written in Latin in the late 12th century.

The manuscripts probably arose at the Premonstratensian monastery of Pöhlde in the Harz region, composed by a monk named Theodore (Theodorus monachus) some time between 1182 and 1197. In 1877, the original was rediscovered by the German historian Georg Waitz at the Oxford Bodleian Library (Laud Misc. 633). The University of Göttingen shelves a 17th-century copy.

The Annales fall in the Christian tradition of universal history and are an important source for the history of high medieval Saxony as pictured in the later Saxon World Chronicle. Nevertheless, they have little to say about the history of Pöhlde itself, despite the fact that it was the site of an imperial palace under the Ottonian dynasty.

The early centuries, from the beginning of the world, are covered by adapting text from the early twelfth-century chroniclers Honorius of Autun, Ekkehard of Aura and Sigebert of Gembloux. Only from the year 469 onwards is the text mostly unique, although parts are based on Paul the Deacon. The last annals concentrate on the history of the German kingdom down to the exile of Duke Henry the Lion in 1182. An annex lists all Popes and Holy Roman Emperors since the birth of Christ down to Emperor Frederick II (1220). Some supplements on the history of Pöhlde Abbey and the Duchy of Brunswick-Lüneburg reach up to the year 1421.

The Annales Palidenses are the only source to claim that Roger II of Sicily became a monk shortly before his death. They are also the first to mention the epithet of King Henry the Fowler (i.e., one who hunts with fowl).

== Editions ==
- Pertz, Georg Heinrich (1859). "Annales Palidenses". Monumenta Germaniae Historica. Hanover. pp. 48–96. This edition is based on the Göttingen copy.

== Sources ==
- Houben, Hubert (2002). Roger II of Sicily: A Ruler Between East and West. Cambridge University Press.
- Schauerte, Thomas (2013). "Annales Palidenses". Encyclopedia of the Medieval Chronicle. Brill Online.
