= Gerberga II, Abbess of Gandersheim =

Gerberga II
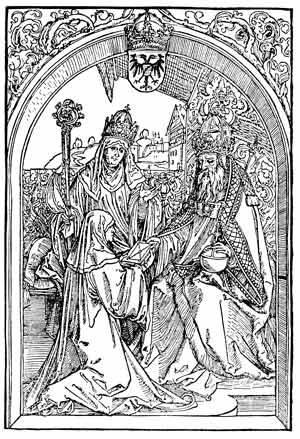
- Hrotsvit of Gandersheim passes her Gesta Ottonis to the emperor Otto I. In the background stands Gerberga II, abbess of Gandersheim Abbey and the niece of Otto. Woodcut by Albrecht Dürer from the first edition of the Opera Hrotsvite, Nürnberg 1501.

Abbess of the Imperial Abbey of Gandersheim
- Reign: 956–1001
- Predecessor: Wendelgard
- Successor: Sophia I
- Born: c. 940
- Died: 13 November 1001; Gandersheim Abbey
- House: Ottonian Dynasty
- Father: Henry I, Duke of Bavaria
- Mother: Judith of Bavaria
- Religion: Catholic

Gerberga II (c. 940 – 13 or 14 November 1001, also called Gerbirg or Gerburg) was the daughter of Henry I of Bavaria and his wife Judith, and a niece of Emperor Otto I. She was Abbess of Gandersheim from 956 to 1001 and personally instructed dramatist and poet Hrosvit of Gandersheim. Under Gerberga's rule, Gandersheim Abbey served as an Ottonian center of cultural, spiritual, and intellectual life.

== Family and early life ==
Gerberga's exact dates of birth and death are not known, though the approximate year of birth 940 has been deduced from sources. Her parents were Henry I, Duke of Bavaria and a member of the Ottonian dynasty, and Judith. At least three of her siblings are known: Henry II of Bavaria, Hadwig of Swabia, and Brunon, Count of Brunswick. Gerberga was sent for education to Gandersheim Abbey at an early age, and became abbess in 956. She supported her brother Henry II in his quest to achieve more influence for their family, but also remained on good terms with her uncle Emperor Otto I and cousin Emperor Otto II.

Gerberga followed in a long tradition of royal abbesses at Gandersheim. The abbey was established by her great-great-grandparents, the Saxon nobles Liudolf and Oda, in the 9th century. Three of their daughters, Hathumonda (852-74), Gerberta I (874-96), and Christina (896-918) served as Gandersheim's three founding abbesses. Gerberga II's ascension to abbess in 965 suggests that Ottonian imperial ties to Gandersheim remained strong throughout the following century.

== Life as abbess ==
Gerberga II served as abbess of Gandersheim from approximately 965 to 1001. She was praised for her integrity, and her reign has been called the "golden age" of the abbey, and described as a time of peace, tranquility, and scholarship. Gandersheim became a center of Ottonian intellectual and spiritual activity, functioning as a hospital, library, a rest stop for refugees or travelers, and, most notably, a school. Many aristocratic families sent their daughters to the abbey to be educated. Among them was the Emperor Otto II and his wife Theophanu, who sent their five-year-old daughter Sophia I to live under Gerberga's care and eventually become her successor.

Gandersheim was given a great deal of independence by the Ottonian rulers. In 947, Gerberga's uncle Emperor Otto I freed the abbey from royal rule and granted the abbess the authority to hold courts of law, keep an army, and coin money. Resultantly, there seems to have been much good will between Gerberga and her uncle. During her reign, she commissioned a history of his life to be written and presented to him by her canoness Hrosvit.

Gandersheim was just one of many influential abbeys in the 10th century. Gerberga's grandmother Matilda of Ringelheim had founded Quedlinburg Abbey in 936, creating tension regarding the leadership of the abbeys. Another rivaling place was Essen Abbey which was also led by family members.

== Education and teaching ==
As a member of the imperial family, Gerberga was well-educated for her time. She was first instructed at St. Emmeram's Abbey in Bavaria, which is likely where she learned the works of many Roman and patristic writers. Like her sister Hadwig, she may have also been educated in Greek. The canoness Hrotsvit wrote of Gerberga's education, "She is younger in years than I, but as befits the Emperor's niece, more advanced in learning."

Scholars have suggested that Hrotsvit, the German canoness, dramatist, and poet, was the special protégé of Gerberga. Hrotsvit praised her abbess in the preface to her legends, writing, "It was she, who, other authors concerning, continued my instruction, offering me an introduction to the works of those writers whom she herself studied with learned men."

Hrotsvit wrote all her works, which include dramas, poems, legends, and histories, while a canoness at Gandersheim. Her Gesta Ottonis, a history of the Ottonian dynasty, was written at the specific request of Gerberga, who likely intended to honor her family lineage and her uncle Otto I. Gerberga encouraged her "effort and diligence in writing".
