= Franconian Rake =

Coat of Arms of the Franconia region in Germany

The Franconian Rake, symbol of the whole of Franconia and part of the Bavarian state coat of arms.

The Franconian Rake (German: Fränkischer Rechen) is the name given to the coat of arms of the region of Franconia in Germany. It is described heraldically as per fess dancetty of three points gules and argent. The points represent a stylised heraldic rake.

== Design and use ==
The Franconian Rake is an heraldic ordinary with a simple zig-zag line of partition that divides the escutcheon or shield into red and silver fields. This simple and regionally widespread symbol was first officially recognised as the Franconian coat of arms in 1804 when Prince Elector Maximilian IV Joseph incorporated it into the Bavarian coat of arms. The colour "Franconian red" (German: Franken-Rot) used for the coat of arms is HKS no. 14.

The shape of the rake represents the holism of heaven and earth and was thus used by church bodies, such as the Bishopric of Würzburg, as a seal or in their coats of arms.

Its three upward or heaven-facing points symbolise the Trinity of God, while its four downward or earthward-facing points represent the four points of the compass on earth.

The present name of the Franconian Rake derives from its appearance, which superficially resembles a flotsam filter or "flotsam rake" (German: Treibgutrechen), and it was therefore probably used as an emblem for villages based around timber-rafting facilities which grew up as a result of the transportation of logs by river.

== History ==
Coat of arms of the Würzburg diocese

The Franconian Rake is first recorded in the early 14th century on the grave of the Würzburg Prince-bishop, Wolfram Wolfskeel von Grumbach (d. 1333), and in a seal for the city of Gerolzhofen. The Franconian Rake was initially chosen by the Bishops of Würzburg as a symbol of their (albeit rather nominal) Franconian ducal status. It was however not a symbol for Franconia as a whole, as the former stem duchy had ceased to exist as an administrative entity a long time ago. From 1835 the Rake appeared in the coat of arms of Bavaria; referring to the East Franconian regions which had been incorporated into the newly established Kingdom of Bavaria after the German mediatization of 1803. Only at this point did it become a symbol for the whole of Franconia in the public consciousness.

Today the emblem is found as part of the coat of arms of many administrative bodies in the Franconian region e.g. the Bavarian provinces of Upper, Middle and Lower Franconia, as well as in adjacent districts covering the territory of the historic East Franconian lands, e.g. Main-Tauber-Kreis in the state of Baden-Württemberg or Hildburghausen in southern Thuringia, and many towns and villages, e.g. in the coat of arms of Volkach or Frankenhardt. So the Franconian Rake demonstrates an allegiance to the common heritage, although the Franconian lands have been split between many lords over the centuries. The Franconian Rake is also part of the large armorial achievements of the Free State of Bavaria and of Baden-Württemberg.

== Examples ==
Armorial achievement of Bavaria

Armorial achievement of Baden-Württemberg

Province of Upper Franconia

Province of Middle Franconia

Province of Lower Franconia

Würzburg

Haßberge

Hildburghausen

Main-Tauber-Kreis

Ansbach

Veilsdorf

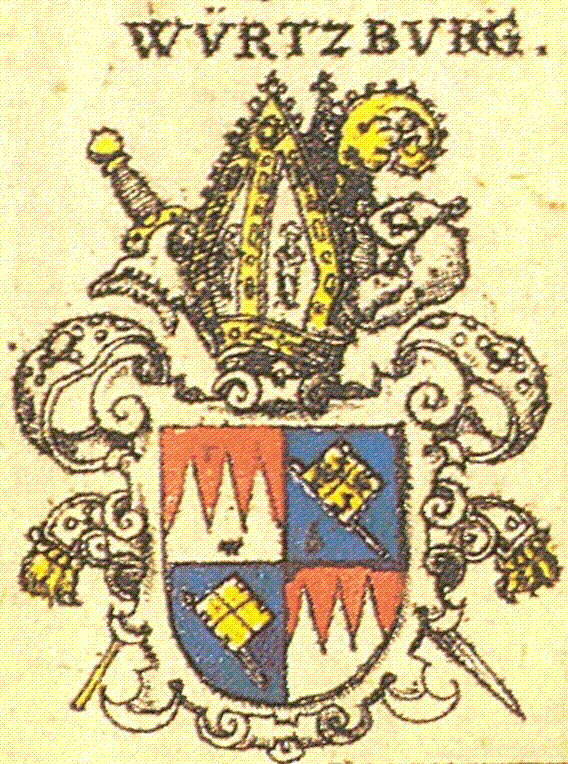
Coat of arms of the Diocese of Würzburg

Gerbrunn

Frankenwinheim

Elfershausen

Frankenbach

Formation sign of the 12th Panzer Division (Bundeswehr)

== Literature ==
- Eugen Schöler: Fränkische Wappen erzählen Geschichte und Geschichten (= Die bibliophile Reihe bei Degener. Bd. 1). Degener, Neustadt an der Aisch, 1992, ISBN 3-7686-7012-0.
