= Hatheburg of Merseburg =

Saxon duchess and abbess (876-after 909)

- Born: 876
- Died: after 909
- Spouse: Henry the Fowler
- Issue: Thankmar
- Father: Erwin of Merseburg

Hatheburg (also Hatheburch) (* 876 in Merseburg; † on 21 June after 909) was the first wife of Henry the Fowler, later king of East Francia (Germany). After their marriage was dissolved, Hatheburg became abbess of a convent.

== Family ==
Hatheburg was the daughter of Erwin of Mersburg, who possessed property in Hassegau and Friesenfeld. The name of Hatheburg's mother is Wendilgarde and her mother's sister, Hildegard, was married to Thietmar, Count of Merseburg, who was Henry the Fowler's military tutor (vir disciplinae militaris peritissmus). Erwin had no sons and Hatheburg and her sister were the heirs to his property.

== Life ==
Hatheburg was married around 890, for the first time, to a man whose name is not known. She was widowed shortly afterwards, and entered a monastery where she took the veil.

According to the chronicler Bishop Thietmar of Merseburg, "burning with youthful love", Henry wanted to marry Hatheburg because of "her beauty and the usefulness of her inherited wealth". Hatheburg and Henry married in 906, and Henry gained control of Hathburg's inheritance. Because Hatheburg had taken the veil, and the couple married without dispensation, their marriage was condemned by Bishop Sigismund of Halberstadt. The couple were threatened with excommunication at a church synod. According to Thietmar, Henry was "disturbed by such talk" and decided to approach the emperor, Conrad I of Germany for help. Conrad ensured that the sentence of excommunication was deferred, and the couple remained married. Yet by 909, Henry began to burn "for the beauty and wealth" of another woman: Matilda of Ringelheim. Henry declared his marriage to Hatheburg has been unlawful, due to her prior vows as a nun, and the couple separated. Hatheburg returned to the convent, where she became abbess, and Henry married Matilda.

== Children ==
Probably in 906 Hatheburg gave birth to Henry's son, Thankmar. Because the validity of Hatheburg and Henry's marriage was questioned, so was Thankmar's legitimacy.
