= Pöhlde =

Village in Lower Saxony, Germany

Coordinates: 51°36′49″N 10°19′01″E

Pöhlde is a village in southern Lower Saxony in Germany. It is part of the town Herzberg am Harz. It has a population of 2,207 (1 October 2006). Archaeological excavation has revealed traces of settlement dating to the 2nd through 4th centuries AD. The town is noted for its Benedictine (later Premonstratensian) abbey. The Annals of Pöhlde, an important 12th century historical text, were composed here.
