= Odo of Wetterau =

10th-century German nobleman

Odo of Wetterau (c. 895 – 949) was a prominent German nobleman of the 10th century.

Odo was the son of Gebhard, Duke of Lorraine and count of Rheingau. In 914, he was appointed Count of Wetterau and founded St. Mary's Church in Wetzlar. The Wetterau had been one of the counties of his father, Gebhard, and Odo also acquired two other counties that had been his: Rheingau in 917 and Lahngau in 918.

Odo is best known for the Battle of Andernach on 2 October 939. The rebellious dukes Gilbert II of Maasgau and Eberhard of Franconia had looted the counties of Odo and his nephew Conrad (Count of Lower Lahngau) east of the Rhine. Their force was so great that Odo and Conrad could not resist them. But when the insurgents crossed the Rhine again at Andernach to return to Lorraine, Odo and Conrad had a chance. Gilbert and Eberhard were still at their rear on the eastern shore when the bulk of the army had made the crossing. At that moment Odo and Conrad fell on and defeated the troops who were left behind. Eberhard was thereby slain and Gilbert drowned when he tried to flee on the Rhine. The rebellion was thus broken and Emperor Otto I the Great could easily recover his authority. Odo thus became a favorite of Otto: at the death of Conrad (949), he was also appointed Count of Lower Lahngau.

Odo married a daughter of Herbert I, Count of Vermandois. They had the following children:

- Gebhard (d. 938), killed in the fight against the insurgency of Thankmar, the elder half-brother of Emperor Otto.
- Herbert (c. 930 – 992)
- Otto
- Odo (d. 26 August 965), appointed Bishop of Strasbourg on 13 August 950, possibly the same person as his brother Otto.
- Judith
- Conrad I, Duke of Swabia

== Sources ==
- Riché, Pierre (1993). The Carolingians: A Family Who Forged Europe. Translated by Allen, Michael Idomir. University of Pennsylvania Press.
- Warner, David, ed. (2001). Ottonian Germany: The Chronicon of Thietmar of Merseburg. Manchester University Press.
