= Duchy of Franconia =

Medieval Frankish stem duchy (906–1168)

Duchy of Franconia Herzogtuom Franken (Middle High German)
- 906–1168
- Coat of arms
- Status: Stem duchy
- Religion: Roman Catholic (official); Germanic paganism
- History
  - Established: 906
  - Disestablished: 1168
Succeeded by
Electoral Palatinate
Prince-Bishopric of Würzburg
County of Nassau
County of Rieneck
- Today part of: Germany

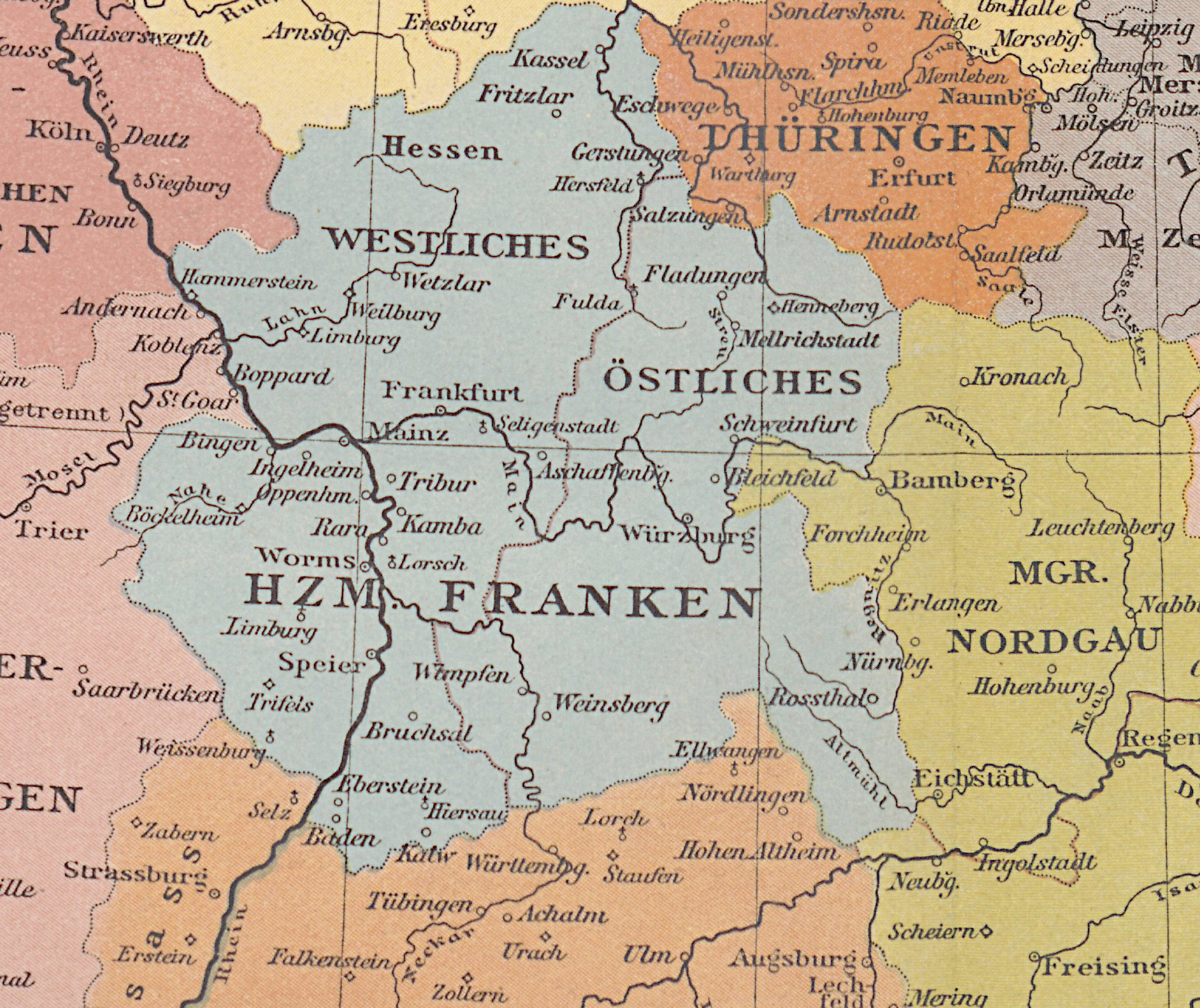
Western and Eastern Franconia, about 800

The Duchy of Franconia (Middle High German: Herzogtuom Franken) was one of the five stem duchies of East Francia and the medieval Kingdom of Germany emerging in the early 10th century. The word Franconia, first used in a Latin charter of 1053, was applied like the words Francia, France, and Franken, to a portion of the land occupied by the Franks.

== Geography ==
It stretched along the valley of the River Main from its confluence with the Upper Rhine up to the Bavarian March of the Nordgau, in the areas of the present-day Bavarian region of Franconia, the adjacent southern parts of the Free State of Thuringia, northern Baden-Württemberg (i.e. Rhine-Neckar and Heilbronn-Franken) and Hesse. It also included several Gaue on the left bank of the Rhine around the cities of Mainz, Speyer and Worms comprising present-day Rhenish Hesse and the Palatinate region.

Located in the centre of what was to become the German kingdom about 919, it bordered the stem Duchy of Saxony in the north, Austrasian Lorraine (Upper and Lower Lorraine) in the west, the Duchy of Swabia in the southwest and the Duchy of Bavaria in the southeast. It was located in Germany.

== History ==
The territory of the Duchy of Franconia was the part of the core Frankish realm of Austrasia which did not pass to Middle Francia/Lotharingia following the Treaty of Verdun

The duchy evolved during the decline of the Carolingian Empire, when it was a part of the core Frankish realm of Austrasia (i.e. "Eastern Francia"), and got its form when the northwestern parts of Austrasia became a new realm called Lotharingia.

Unlike the other stem duchies, Franconia did not evolve into a stable political entity, though the local Salian counts held large estates in the western parts (Rhenish Franconia). In 906 the Conradine relative Count Conrad the Younger in the Lahngau is mentioned as a dux Franconiae. Upon the extinction of the East Frankish Carolingians in 911, he was elected the first German king and was succeeded as Franconian duke by his younger brother Eberhard. However, the Conradines did not prevail against the rising Saxon Ottonians: In 919 Duke Henry of Saxony succeeded Conrad as German king. Henry's son King Otto I seized the Franconian stem duchy after an unsuccessful revolt of Duke Eberhard was shattered at the 939 Battle of Andernach. King Otto did not appoint a new duke of Franconia, and the duchy was fragmented into several counties and bishoprics, which reported to the German kings directly.

The Salian counts in Rhenish Franconia were sometimes mentioned as Franconian dukes and they became Germany's royal and imperial dynasty in 1024. In 1093 their Franconian territories were granted as a fief to the palatine count of Aachen, which would evolve into the important German principality of Electoral Palatinate (Kurpfalz). With the advancement of Count Conrad the Red, Rhenish Franconia became the heartland of the Salian dynasty, which provided four emperors in the 11th and 12th centuries: Conrad II, Henry III, Henry IV, and Henry V. It contained the cities of Mainz, Speyer and Worms, the latter two being the administrative centres of countships within the hands of the Salian descendants of Conrad the Red. These counts were sometimes referred to as the Dukes of Franconia.

Emperor Conrad II was last to bear the ducal title. When he died in 1039, Rhenish Franconia was governed as a constellation of small states, including the cities of Frankfurt, Speyer and Worms; the Prince-bishoprics of Mainz, Speyer, and Worms; and the Landgraviate of Hesse (then part of Thuringia). Alongside these powerful entities were many smaller, petty states. In 1093, Emperor Henry IV gave the Salian territories in Rhenish Franconia as a fief to Henry of Laach, the count palatine of Lower Lorraine at Aachen. His lands would evolve into the important principality of Electoral Palatinate. While Emperor Frederick Barbarossa in 1168 granted the ducal title to the prince-bishops of Würzburg in Eastern Franconia, Rhenish Franconia was divided and extinguished. Its territories became part of the Imperial Upper Rhenish Circle in 1500.

As of the 13th century, the following states, among others, had formed in the territory of the former Duchy:

- Bishopric of Würzburg
- Abbacy of Fulda
- County of Abenberg
- County of Henneberg
- County of Hohenlohe
- County of Lauffen
- County of Löwenstein
- County Palatine of the Rhine
- County of Nassau
- County of Rieneck
- County of Truhendingen
- County of Vaihingen
- County of Wertheim
- County of Wildberg

== Dukes ==
Coat of arms of Franconia

- Henry (882–92), as "Margrave of the Franks" (marchio francorum) and "Duke of the Austrasians" (dux austrasiorum)
- Conrad the Elder (died 906) is sometimes treated retrospectively as the ruler of Franconia
- Conrad I, the Younger (906–18), also King of Germany from 911
- Eberhard (918–39)
- Otto of Worms (985–1004), called "duke of the Franks of Worms" (Wormatiensis dux Francorum)
- Conrad, son of prec., titled "duke of Worms"

...

- Frederick (died 1105), called himself "Duke of Franconia" towards his death
- Conrad II (1116–25), titled "duke of the East Franks" (dux Francorum orientalium)

In 1168 the duchy of Franconia was bestowed by the Emperor Frederick I on the Bishopric of Würzburg. The bishops continued to rule until the bishopric was secularized in 1803 and absorbed into the Electorate of Bavaria. When the Grand Duchy of Würzburg, the Archbishopric of Mainz and most other parts of Franconia became part of the Kingdom of Bavaria in 1814, the kings assumed the ducal title. The present head of the House of Wittelsbach, Franz, Duke of Bavaria (born 1933) is still traditionally styled as His Royal Highness the Duke of Bavaria, Duke in Swabia and Franconia, Count Palatine of the Rhine.

== Sources ==
- Franken. In: Meyers Konversations-Lexikon. 4th edition. Volume 6, Verlag des Bibliographischen Instituts, Leipzig/Vienna 1885–1892, p. 491.
- Jackman, Donald C. (1990). The Konradiner: A Study in Genealogical Methodology. Frankfurt: Vittorio Klostermann.
- Lyon, Jonathan R. (2012). Princely Brothers and Sisters: The Sibling Bond in German Politics, 1100–1250. Cornell University Press.
