= Sächsische Weltchronik =

Universal history written in German prose

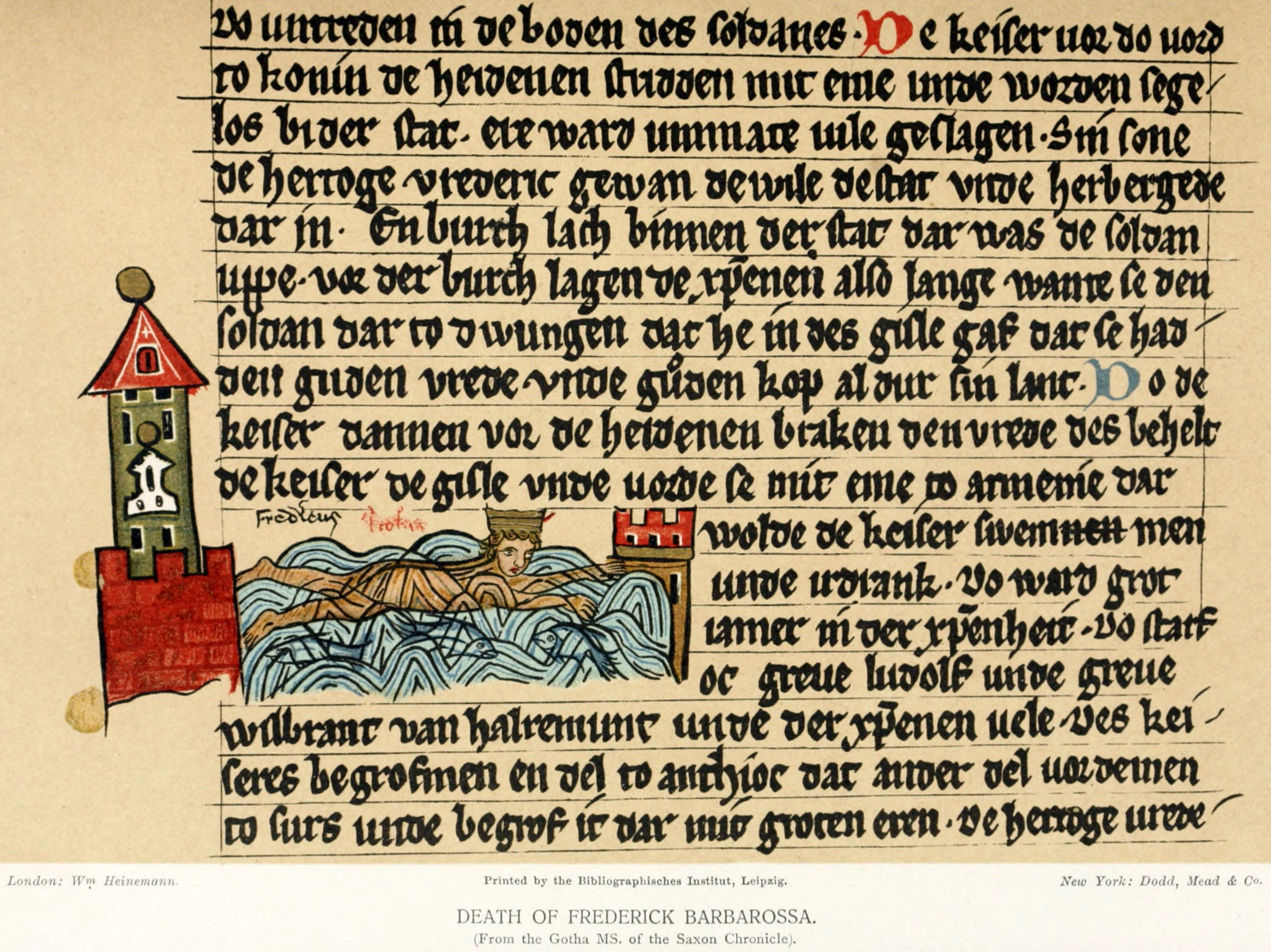
The death of Frederick Barbarossa as depicted in the Gotha manuscript of the Sächsische Weltchronik

The Sächsische Weltchronik ("Saxon World Chronicle") is a universal history written in German prose. It is not clear in which regional form of German the original was written. Of the twenty-four surviving manuscripts, ten are in Low German, nine in High German and five in Central German. These can be divided into three recensions, the earliest dated to 1229 and the latest to 1277.

The 98-line verse prologue is always in High German. The Weltchronik is the oldest historical work in German prose. The Kaiserchronik is earlier, but in verse. The Weltchronik of Rudolf von Ems is contemporary, but also verse. Ludwig Weiland, who made a critical edition for the Monumenta Germaniae Historica in 1877, gave it the conventional title by which it is most commonly known. The first edition was prepared by Hans Ferdinand Massmann in 1857, but was based on only one manuscript. The manuscripts are classified into three recensions—A, B and C—and the oldest group (A) is entirely High German. Michael Menzel classifies a fifteenth-century manuscript from Wolfenbüttel as the Leittext.

It was once thought that the Weltchronik might be the work of Eike of Repgow, the author of the Sachsenspiegel (a Low German work on law), but this hypothesis—which depended in part on the assumption that the original work was Low German—has been abandoned. The author employed at least thirty-six different Latin chronicles in his research. The most important were the Chronicle of Frutolf of Michelsberg, the continuation of the same by Ekkehard of Aura and the Annales Palidenses.

== Sources ==
- Kries, F. W. von (1987). "Review of Die sächsische Weltchronik: Quellen und Stoffauswahl by Michael Menzel". Speculum. 62 (2): 448–50. doi:10.2307/2855265.
- Shaw, Frank (2013). "Sächsische Weltchronik". Encyclopedia of the Medieval Chronicle. Brill Online.
