= María Francisca Ricart Olmos =

Spanish nun

Blessed María Francisca Ricart Olmos OSM

Martyr
- Born: 23 February 1881; Albal, Valencia, Kingdom of Spain
- Died: 2 October 1936 (aged 55); Silla, Valencia, Second Spanish Republic
- Venerated in: Roman Catholic Church
- Beatified: 11 March 2001, Saint Peter's Square by Pope John Paul II
- Feast: 2 October (in the female branch of the Servite order), 3 October (Servite order)

María Francisca Ricart Olmos, religious name María Guadalupe, (23 February 1881 – 2 October 1936) was a Spanish nun of the Servite Order. Ricart's call to the religious life manifested at the time she made her First Communion after expressing the desire to consecrate herself to God; she entered the convent when she turned fifteen and served her convent as both a prioress and mistress of novices. Her peers held her in high regard for her dedication to helping and instructing the novices as well as for her compassionate and jovial character.

Ricart's beatification process opened in the late 1950s and concluded upon her beatification itself on 11 March 2001 in which Pope John Paul II beatified her and 232 others slain during the Spanish Civil War.

== Life ==
María Francisca Ricart Olmos was born in 1881 in Albal nine kilometers from Valencia as the second of four children to Francisco Ricart and María Olmos; she was baptized within a week following her birth. Her eldest sibling was José and the two siblings that followed her were Antonio and Filomena. Her father died in 1885 due to illness and people in their village often referred to her mother as a saint.

Ricart became an active participant in parish life and later made her First Communion in 1891. Ricart was known for being exuberant in her childhood but was noted to have grown more reserved following her First Communion due to the strengthening of her faith; she still maintained a kind and amiable disposition to those around her. Vicente Garrido Pastor oversaw her and other girls' formation for First Communion and asked if some of them would be willing to dedicate themselves to God. Garrido was surprised when Ricart raised her hand at once and replied in the affirmative with a smile.

The girl made frequent visits to the Pie de la Cruz convent of the Servite Order in Valencia since it was there that her mother had a friend. This made the convent recognizable for Ricart who longed to enter it as a nun. It was also in that place that her call to the religious life grew to the point where both her mother and parish priest agreed to allow her to enter the convent on 11 July 1896 after she turned fifteen. Ricart made her solemn vows on 19 June 1900 as María Guadalupe.

From 1928 until 1931 she served as the novice mistress before she served as the convent's prioress from 1931 until 1934 when she was re-elected as the novice mistress; she would hold that position until her death. Ricart was devoted to the Passion and often meditated on the sufferings of the Mary at the foot of the Cross. Her colleagues held her in high regard for her jovial and compassionate spirit as well as for her strong leadership abilities while noting her dedication to passing down the proper values of contemplative life to new members.

In July 1936 the Archbishop of Valencia Prudencio Melo i Alcalde ordered the religious of the convent to adopt secular clothing and flee their convent to take refuge with their families due to the increasing violence and anti-religious sentiment of the Spanish Civil War. Ricart first moved into her niece's home but remained there for just over a week since her niece was pregnant and Ricart did not wish to jeopardize her niece's life. Ricart moved to Albal after this at the month's end to reside with her sister Filomena.

On 2 October 1936 just after midnight she was disturbed after hearing a commotion. Ricart left her room to see her sister and brother-in-law José attempting to prevent four militiamen from searching the house. Filomena had been seated while José was asleep when the four men knocked on the window three times asking to be allowed into the home. Ricart made her presence known to which one soldier asked if she was a nun after a scapular and other items were discovered. Ricart replied "I am a nun" to which the same man said: "You must come with us". Ricart was calm and offered no resistance as she said "then let's go". The nun climbed into the back of a truck clutching her crucifix and urged courage to her sister and brother-in-law. Her final actions were first to thank José for all he had done for her and hugging Filomena with a calm and serene look.

Ricart was hauled before a sham tribunal which sentenced her to death. But she demonstrated a great degree of peace which made her executioners hesitant in following their orders. One of the militiamen grew frustrated and called them "cowards" before declaring that he would kill her himself. Ricart was killed two hours later at 4:00am after two shots ended her life as well as a period of extreme abuse and ill-treatment. Ricart was killed in Torre Espioca along the Silla-Picassent town borders on the provincial road to Madrid.

Her remains were left in a common grave but relocated on 2 March 1940 to the convent before being moved again to the relocated convent at Mislata beside the main altar. Her remains were exhumed on 19 June 2000 for canonical inspection. This meant her remains would be examined before being re-clothed and sterilized for transferral and reburial. This lasted one week in preparation for her beatification.

== Beatification ==
The beatification process for Ricart opened in the Valencia archdiocese under Marcelino Olaechea i Loizaga who inaugurated a diocesan investigation on 24 January 1958 before closing it just a few months later on 21 June. The cause remained dormant for sometime until 17 July 1987 when the Congregation for the Causes of Saints validated this investigation in Rome. Pope John Paul II issued final approval on 28 June 1999 in a move that confirmed Ricart would be beatified. The beatification was celebrated on 11 March 2001 in Saint Peter's Square in which Ricart was beatified alongside 232 other Spanish Martyrs; she is often identified as a member of that large group despite her cause having been initiated and conducted separate to the group. The current postulator for this cause is the Servite priest Franco M. Azzalli.
