= Battle of Andernach (939) =

939 AD battle for royal succession within the Kingdom of Germany

Date	2 October 939
Location	Andernach, Lotharingia
Result	Rebellion crushed

Belligerents
Kingdom of Germany (East Francia)	Duchy of Franconia; Duchy of Lotharingia

Commanders and leaders
Konrad Kurzbold; Udo von der Wetterau	Eberhard †; Gilbert †

Strength
Unknown	Unknown

The Battle of Andernach, between the followers and the opponents of King Otto I of Germany, took place on 2 October 939 in Andernach on the Rhine river and ended with a decisive defeat of the rebels and the death of their leaders.

Duke Eberhard of Franconia, a scion of the Conradine dynasty, had been a loyal supporter of the Liudolfing king Henry I of Germany (919–936). After the king's death however, he soon entered into conflict with his son and successor, Otto I, who did not see himself, as his father did, as primus inter pares. After Eberhard and other princes refused to pay homage to Otto in 937 his opponents joined Eberhard. In 938 he rebelled together with Otto’s elder half-brother Thankmar and the duke Eberhard of Bavaria. However, Thankmar was soon slain by Otto’s followers in the church of Eresburg (938), and Eberhard of Bavaria was replaced by his uncle Berthold. After a short reconciliation with Otto, Eberhard allied himself in 939 with Gilbert of Lorraine and Otto’s younger brother Henry of Bavaria to renew the rebellion. Gilbert, duke of Lorraine since 928 and husband to Otto's sister Gerberga since 929, had also been loyal during the rule of Henry I. Some sources say that Gerberga favored her brother Henry over her brother Otto for the East Francian throne, and that Gilbert rose against Otto at her request. In any case, in 939 he joined the revolt headed by Otto's brother Henry of Bavaria and Eberhard of Franconia. In so doing he allied himself with the new king of the West Franks Louis IV, perhaps with a mind to gain favor with the powerful monarch and other West Francian nobility.

King Otto achieved at first a victory over the rebels in the Battle of Birten, close to Xanten, although he could only pray and watch on the other side of the Rhine. Nonetheless he was not able to capture the conspirators. Meanwhile, Gilbert and Eberhard went to the south and devastated the areas of royalist counts. They received support from Louis IV, from Otto's brother-in-law (Hedwig's husband) Hugh the Great and other important West Frankish rulers. When Otto besieged Breisach, the insurgents advanced from Metz to the Rhine and crossed it by Andernach.

After the army went pillaging through the Niederlahngau, it started again to cross over the Rhine by Andernach. Gilbert and Eberhard were surprised by the two royalist counts, Konrad Kurzbold, count of Niederlahngau, and his cousin Udo, count of Wetterau and Rheingau. Although the Conradines and the cousins of Eberhard stood both on Otto's side, they followed the rebels with a small army and attacked only when the majority of the opposing army had already set with its booty over the Rhine. Eberhard was slain in the fight and Gilbert drowned in the Rhine when he attempted to escape to the other side. Thus ended the rebellion against Otto I.
