= Lahngau =

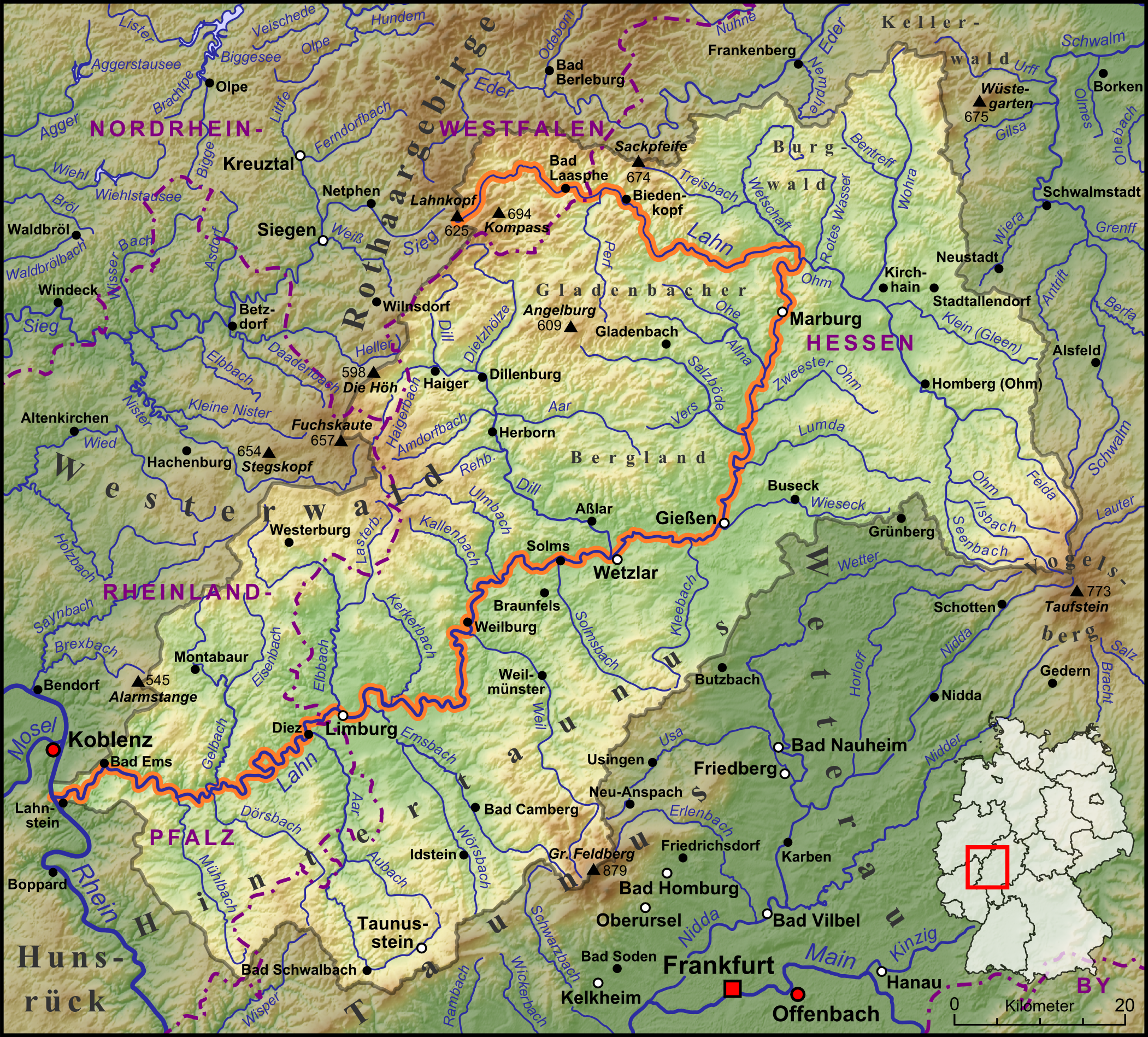
Map of the Lahn river from its source in the Rothaargebirge to its mouth near Koblenz

The Lahngau was a medieval territory comprising the middle and lower Lahn River valley in the current German states of Hesse and (partially) Rhineland-Palatinate. The traditional names of the Gau are Loganahe Pagus or Pagus Logenensis.

The Lahngau was the East Frankish ancestral homeland of the Conradines. It was divided in ca. 900 into the Upper and Lower Lahngau (translated from the German Oberlahngau and Niederlahngau [or Unterlahngau], respectively).

== Location ==
The western boundary of the Lahngau was near present-day Montabaur. To the west of the Lahngau, extending to the Rhine River, was the Engersgau with its center in the Neuwied Basin. The northwestern border was marked by the watershed of the Westerwald. Northwest and north of the Lahngau was the Auelgau with its central settlements near the mouth of the Sieg River and probably in the Siegerland. North and northeast of the Lahngau was the Hessengau, the former settlement area of the Chatti. Like the Lahngau, the Hessengau would for a time be dominated by the Conradines. Southeast of the Lahngau was the Wettereibagau (later called the Wetterau). South, at the watershed of the Taunus Mountains, was the boundary with the Königssondergau. In the 1845 travel guide Le Rhin, Victor Hugo notes: "Then comes Braubach, named in a charter of 933, fief of the Counts Arnstein of Lahngau; an Imperial city under Rodolph in 1270, a domain of the Counts of Katznellenbogen in 1283; accruing to Hesse in 1473; to Darmstadt, in 1632, and in 1802 to Nassau."

The exact demarcation of the boundary between Oberlahngau and Niederlahngau has not survived. According to some historians, the approximate boundary is presumed to have been the watershed between the Solmsbach and the Weil River, east of Weilburg. Christian Spielmann writes in 1894, “Weilburg lay in the Niederlahngau. It extended from about the Nister to the Pfahlgraben and from the Gelbach and Aar westward to the Ulmbach and eastward to Weil. Other historians suggest the border was west of Weilburg. Hellmuth Gensicke suggested the watershed between the Kerkerbach and Elbbach as a possible boundary. The following discussion is based on the interpretation of Gensicke assuming a border west Weilburg.

The Carolingian gaus were divided into districts called Zentmarken. For these districts names such as "(Unter)gau" (sub-gau), “Zente” (center), or “Mark” (march) were used. The original Zentmarken of the Niederlahngau were probably the Reckenforst around Dietkirchen, the Hadamarer Mark, the Ellarer Mark, and the Zente Winnen - Höhn. In the Oberlahngau were the Haiger Mark and the Herborner Mark. The Erdagau should also be understood as a sub-gau of the Lahngau. The assignment of the Kallenbach Zent (or Kallenbergskopf) north of present-day Löhnberg is unclear and depends on which interpretation of the boundary is adopted. With increasingly denser populations, the Zentmarken were divided or new ones were established.

The population centers of the Lahngau developed from places established at fords on the Lahn. Some of these places go back, according to archaeological finds, to Frankish camps of the 6th and 7th centuries that secured crossings of the Lahn. The urban centers of the Niederlahngau were the later cities of Diez (first mentioned as "Theodissa" in 790) and Limburg (first mentioned as "Lintpurc" in 910). The centers that developed in the Oberlahngau were Wetzlar (first mentioned as "Weftifa" in 832), Haiger (first mentioned as "Haigrahe" in 778), and, depending on the course of the border, Weilburg (first mentioned as "Wilineburch" in 906).

Dietkirchen (mentioned in 841 as the "ecclesia Dietkircha") emerged as an important ecclesiastical center for the Lahngau. In the Middle Ages, the St. Lubentius at Dietkirchen was the seat of an archdeaconry that included all of the areas on the right bank of the Rhine belonging to the Archbishopric of Trier.

== History ==
At the time of its first historical mention, the area of the Lahngau lay in the settlement area of a Germanic tribe called the Ubii. After the migration of Ubii across the Rhine ca. 39 BC, the area was rather sparsely populated. It evolved into a border region between the Franks in the Westerwald, the Chatti in present-day North Hesse, and the Alamanni in the Taunus and Wetterau. In the 5th and 6th centuries, the Franks gained the supremacy. The Chatti became members of the Frankish tribal confederation, and Alamannia became a Frankish protectorate. This enabled the Franks to incorporate the territory of the Lahngau into its empire. During the period of Frankish conquest, the Frankish Conradine family established itself as a leading noble house in the Lahngau. The Conradines maintained close familial relationships with the Carolingians and Robertians.

An important role in the management of the Lahngau was taken by the monasteries and original parishes. At the beginning of Conradine rule in the Lahngau, the only existing monastery was that of St. Lubentius in Dietkirchen, which was probably founded as early as the 6th century. The first mention of this monastery was only in 841 as a “monasterium” (hermitage). In 845 Count Gebhard founded the St. Severus Abbey in the Kettenbach, which would later in his lifetime relocate to Gemünden. At the beginning of the 10th century, other Conradine foundations followed: St. George in Limburg (910), St. Walpurgis Abbey in Weilburg (912), and St. Mary's Abbey in Wetzlar (914/15).

The Conradines achieved the peak of their power when Conrad the Younger, the Count of Oberlahngau and the Duke of Franconia, was chosen King of East Francia in 911. At least four stays by Conrad in Weilburg are attested to. The Conradines were not, however, able to establish a royal dynasty. According to Widukind of Corvey, Conrad on his deathbed in Weilburg recommended to his brother, Margrave (and later Duke) Eberhard III of Franconia, to forgo any ambition for the German crown and offer it instead to Henry of Saxony, one of his principal opponents, since he considered Henry to be the only prince capable of holding the Kingdom together in the face of internal rivalries among the dukes. This event would become known as the "Weilburg Testament," but is now considered by some historians to be a legend circulated by one of the Liudolfings.

In the conflict between Eberhard III of Franconia, as Conrad’s successor as Count in the Oberlahngau, and King Otto I came the final division of the Conradine dynasty. In the Battle of Andernach on October 2, 939, Eberhard was defeated and killed by his cousin Conrad Kurzbold, Count in Niederlahngau, and Eberhard’s branch of the Conradine family lost the lordship over the Oberlahngau. Parts of the realm were transferred to Conrad Kurzbold’s branch of the family and other parts confiscated by the Ottonian king. In these areas, after a checkered history, the House of the Gisos of Gudensberg prevailed until the 11th century. The area around Weilburg was granted by the Ottonian kings to the Bishopric of Worms after 1000.

The Niederlahngau was held by the Conradines until the second half of the 10th century. The last mention of a Conradine count was in 966. The Niederlahngau went over to the Countship of Diez. The extensive Conradine allodial lands in the Niederlahngau came, probably through familial relationships, to the Counts of (Alt-) Leiningen. After the extinction of this house in 1220, it was distributed among the related dynasties of Nassau, Runkel/Westerburg, Isenburg/Limburg, and Virneburg.

== Counts in the Lahngau ==
The following are attested as counts of the undivided Lahngau:

- Conrad, attested to as Count in the Lahngau in 772 and 773; he is regarded as the father of the House of the Conradines
- Udo the Elder (died 834), attested to in the Rhine region as Count in the Lahngau (820-826) and Count of Orléans (828-834).
- Gebhard, attested to in 832 as Count in the Lahngau; in 845, he endowed St. Severus Abbey in Kettenbach; died in Gemünden in 879. He had four sons: Udo (Count in the Lahngau), Berengar (Count in the Hessengau), Waldo (abbot of St. Maximin) and Berthold (Archbishop of Trier).
- Udo, son of Gebhard, Count in Lahngau around 860/879

Other possible rulers of the Lahngau referenced to are:

- Adaltrud, widow of the Count in the Lahngau, gave Fulda Abbey property in Selters, Meinlinten, Buchen, and Neistenbach between 750 and 779.
- Adrian; in 821, his widow Waltrat gave, with consent of a certain Uuto, property in Bermbach, Stetim and Feldum.

=== Counts in the Niederlahngau ===
The following are attested to as Count in the Niederlahngau:

- Eberhard (died 902/903 before Bamberg), brother of Conrad the Elder, Count in Niederlahngau; identified as Count in Ortenau in 888; married Wiltrud (died 933), probably daughter of Walaho
- Conrad Kurzbold (died June 30, 948), son of Eberhard, mentioned in 906/907 and 932 as Count in the Wormsgau, in 910 as Count in the lower Niederlahngau, and in 927 as Count in the Ahrgau and in the Lobdengau; in 910, he endowed St. George’s Abbey in Limburg an der Lahn, where he was later buried.
- Eberhard (died May 10, 966), brother of Conrad Kurzbold; first mentioned in 948, in 958 and 966, identified as Count in the Auelgau, in 958 as Count in the Niederlahngau, in 966 Count in the Lahngau; he is the last known Conradine count in the Niederlahngau.
- Gerlach (died ca. 1018), identified in 1002 and 1013 as Count in the Niederlahngau; on October 31, 1002, Emperor Henry II bequeathed to the Cathedral of Worms "the town of Weilburg located in the Lahngau in the countship of Count Gerlach.”
- Godebold, identified in 1053 as ruling in the southern Niederlahngau
- Embricho, identified in 1053 as ruling in the northern Niederlahngau over Limburg, Brechelbach, Seck, and Westernohe. Embricho is the founder of the countly House of Diez.

=== Counts in Oberlahngau ===
- Conrad the Elder (died 906), son of Udo of Neustria, identified as Count in the Oberlahngau and Hessengau in 897
- Conrad the Younger (born ca. 880/885; died December 23, 918), the son Conrad the Elder; identified as Count in the Lahngau, Hessengau and probably the Königssondergau since 906; Duke of Franconia after 908, King of East Francia after 911
- Otto (died after 918), the son of Conrad the Elder; identified in 904 as Count in the Ruhrgau and in 912 as Count on the Middle Lahn
- Eberhard, Otto's brother; identified as Count of Hessengau and Persgau from 913, Count of Oberlahngau from 918, Margrave from 914-918, and finally until his death Duke of Franconia; from 926 to 928 he was simultaneously Duke of Lorraine.
- Udo (died 949), grandson of Udo; identified in 914 as Count in the Wetterau, in 917 and 948 as Count in the Rheingau, in 918 as Count in the Lahngau; in 914/915, he endowed St. Mary’s Abbey in Wetzlar, where he would later be buried; he is the last known Conradine count in the Oberlahngau; he married the daughter of Count Herbert I of Vermandois (a Carolingian)
- Hildelin, mentioned in 975, unknown origin
- Gerlach, mentioned 993–1017 (possibly identical with the Gerlach ruling at the same time in the Niederlahngau)
- Giso I of the House of the Gisos, Count in the Oberlahngau ca. 1008
- Werner III of Maden, mentioned as Count in the Lahngau between 1062 and 1065; under his reign the Oberlahngau had already lost considerable property.
- Hermann II of Gleiberg, mentioned in 1075, united the remnants of the Oberlahngau with the Countship of Gleiberg.

== Open questions ==
The main sources of the history of the Lahngau are copies made in the High Middle Ages of older documents. There is always the question whether these documents were based on original sources or produced as counterfeits. If they were based on original manuscripts, some of which would have been 500 years old, it is often unclear whether they were reproduced literally or only paraphrased. The persons named in the documents may not always be clearly identifiable. Place names are often in unusual forms and do not always correspond to the same names today. Complete overviews of property ownership for this area only exist from the 12th century, so the opportunity to draw inferences is limited. Archaeological finds that are available for review are often random finds, for example in the context of modern construction. Many suspected archaeological sites have not been systematically investigated. For these reasons, some important questions about the history of the Lahngau remain unsettled.

For example, the Lahngau may originally have belonged not to the Conradines but to the Robertian sphere of influence. Through an exchange at the beginning of the 9th century, the Conradines may have taken over the Robertines’ possessions in East Francia and the Robertians received the Conradine possessions on the Loire River in West Francia. Such a process would explain the equation of Udo of the Oberlahngau with Odo I of Blois, as well as the extensive holdings in the Lahngau by Lorsch Abbey (founded by the Robertians).

The assignment to Weilburg to the Upper or Lower Lahngau is also controversial. Since the Conradine family line of Conrad the Elder is identified as Counts in Weilburg, the assignment has a crucial role in the history of the Oberlahngau.

The development of the church organization in the Lahngau is also not exactly known. Some historians, for example, doubt that Dietkirchen could have been the starting point of Christianization in the Archdiocese of Trier, since the Archdeaconate there would only be established by the Archdiocese after the decline of Conradine rule.

Finally, relationship between the Conradines and the Counts of Diez can be neither proven nor disproved. The origin of the House of Diez is unknown. The extensive allodial property of the Counts of Diez in Wormsgau does not speak against a Conradine descent, since the Wormsgau also belonged to the Conradine sphere of influence.

== Sources ==
- Gensicke, Hellmuth (1999). Landesgeschichte des Westerwaldes (History of the Westerwald) (in German) (3rd ed.). Wiesbaden: Historische Kommission für Nassau (Historical Commission for Nassau). ISBN 3-922244-80-7.
- Spielmann, Christian (1896). Geschichte der Stadt und Herrschaft Weilburg (History of the City and Lordship of Weilburg) (in German). City of Weilburg. (reprint 2005).
- Bröckel, Edith; et al. (2006). Weilburg-Lexikon (in German). Weilburg: Magistrat der Stadt Weilburg., no ISBN, p. 215-217.
- Schweitzer, Peter Paul (2006). "Dietkirchen - Der Name der Kirche und des Dorf an der Lahn (Dietkirchen - The name of the church and the village on the Lahn)". Nassauische Annalen (in German). 117. Wiesbaden: Verlag des Vereines für Nassauische Altertumskunde und Geschichtsforschung. ISSN 0077-2887. p. 1-16.
- Morlang, Adolf (2002). "König Konrad I. und sein Denkmal bei Villmar ad Lahn (King Conrad I and his monument in Villmar on the Lahn)". Nassauische Annalen (in German). 113. Wiesbaden: Verlag des Vereines für Nassauische Altertumskunde und Geschichtsforschung. ISSN 0077-2887. p. 409-420.
