= Matilda of Ringelheim =

German queen from 909 to 936

Saint Matilda
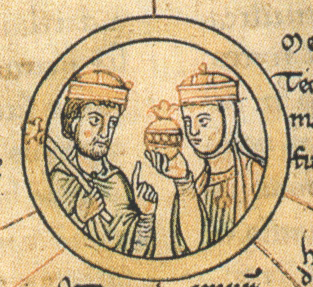
- King Henry and Matilda, detail from the Chronica sancti Pantaleonis, 12th century
- Born: c. 892; Enger, Saxony, East Francia
- Died: 14 March 968; Quedlinburg, Saxony, Holy Roman Empire
- Venerated in: Eastern Orthodox Church, Roman Catholic Church
- Canonized: after 968
- Major shrine: Quedlinburg Abbey, Saxony-Anhalt, Germany
- Feast: 14 March

Matilda of Ringelheim (c. 892 – 14 March 968), also known as Saint Matilda, was a Saxon noblewoman who became queen of Germany. Her husband, Henry the Fowler, was the first king from the Ottonian dynasty, and their eldest son, Otto the Great, restored the Holy Roman Empire in 962. Matilda founded several spiritual institutions and women's convents. She was considered to be extremely pious, righteous and charitable. Matilda's two hagiographical biographies and The Deeds of the Saxons serve as authoritative sources about her life and work.

== Early life and dynastic connections ==
Matilda was born in around 892. She was a daughter of Dietrich and Reinhild. He was count of the Duchy of Saxony in the Kingdom of Germany, formed fifty years earlier after the Treaty of Verdun. Fighting against Charlemagne at that time had been the Saxon duke Widukind, from whom Dietrich was descended.

It was in Herford Abbey, in the Duchy of Saxony, that Matilda was raised by her grandmother (also called Matilda). She had three sisters; Amalrada, Bia and Fridarun. Fridarun was to go on to marry Charles the Simple, king of West Francia. Matilda also had a brother, Beuve, who would eventually become Beuve II, Bishop of Châlons-sur-Marne. Matilda was to have a niece called Fridarun, whose marriage to Count Wichmann the Elder meant there was an alliance between the House of Billung and the Ottonian family. This expanded their possessions to the west.

== Marriage to Henry I ==
When Matilda was seventeen, in 909, she married Henry, at the time duke of Saxony. He subsequently became king of East Francia. Henry's first marriage to Hatheburg of Merseburg had been annulled.

Some twenty years later, in 929, Matilda received her dower, which Henry gave her in the so-called Hausordnung. This dower amounted to land in Quedlinburg, Pöhlde, Nordhausen, Grona (near Göttingen) and Duderstadt.

As queen, Matilda took an interest in women's monasteries. Her influence on the king's reign is said to have been her strong sense of justice.

=== Children ===
Matilda bore the king five children:

- Otto (912–973), crowned the Holy Roman emperor in 962
- Henry (919/22–955), who became duke of Bavaria in 948
- Bruno (925–965), who was elected archbishop of Cologne in 953 and made duke of Lorraine in 954
- Hedwig (910–965/80), who married the West Frankish duke Hugh the Great
- Gerberga (c. 913–968/69 or 984), who first married Duke Gilbert of Lorraine and then King Louis IV of France

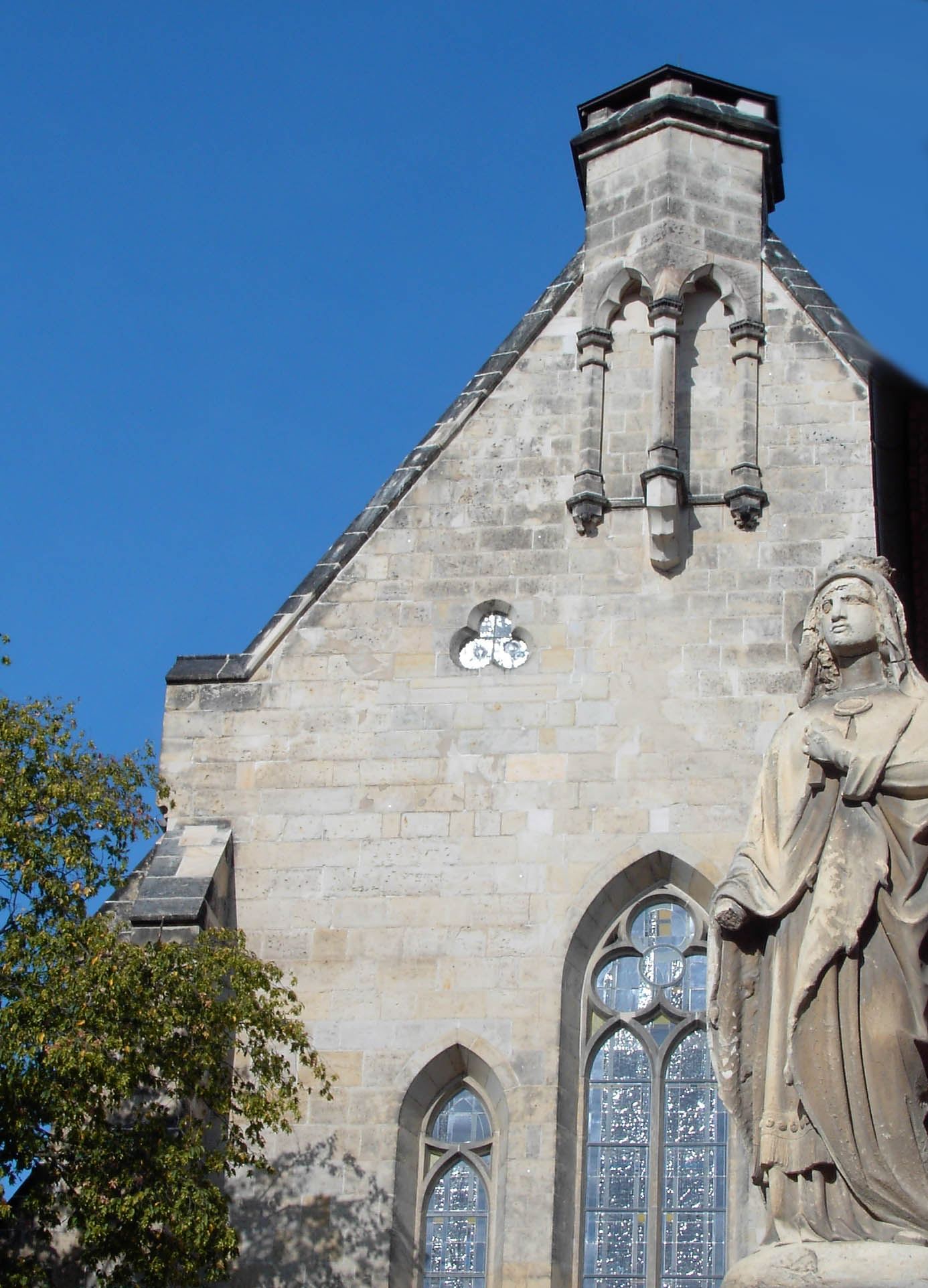
The Church of St. Matilda in Quedlinburg

== Life as a widow ==
Henry died in 936 in Memleben and was buried in Quedlinburg. It was here that Queen Matilda founded a convent in the same year. She lived there during the following years and took care of the family's legacy. Thus, Quedlinburg Abbey became not only the most important centre of prayer in the kingdom, but also a place to commemorate its famous dead.

As with other convents in the kingdom, Quedlinburg became a place for the education of noble families' daughters. Some became abbesses, securing a family's influence. One such was Matilda's own granddaughter, Matilda. She was the daughter of the above-mentioned Otto I and Adelheid of Burgundy. It was to this granddaughter that the queen, in 966, after 30 years' leadership, passed on responsibility for the convent. This Matilda thus became the first abbess of the convent in Quedlinburg.

With her other resources, Queen Matilda founded more convents, one of them in Enger in 947. Her last foundation was in 961, the convent of Nordhausen.

Over the years 936–946, Matilda's handling of her dower was disputed by her son Otto. He claimed his mother's possessions. Eventually this led to her fleeing into exile. Otto's wife, Queen Eadgyth, is said to have brought about a reconciliation: Matilda was to leave her wealth, and furthermore Otto was to be forgiven for his actions.

The above feud remains controversial to this day: to protect her legacy in the lead up to her death early in 968, Matilda acquired for all monasteries in eastern Saxony papal privileges. These were overridden after her death when Matilda's dower passed to Theophanu, the wife of Matilda's grandson Otto II.

== Death ==
Queen Matilda died in the convent of Quedlinburg on 14 March 968, after a long illness. She was buried in Quedlinburg Abbey, next to her late husband. Throughout her life, Matilda had been dedicated to charity and her ecclesiastical foundations – as attested repeatedly in two hagiographies. A commemorative plaque can be found in the Walhalla memorial near Regensburg, Germany.

== Legacy ==
Matilda is the patron of the St. Mathilde church in Laatzen (Germany), the St. Mathilde church in Quedlinburg (Germany), the Melkite church in Aleppo (Syria), and the Mathilden-Hospital in Herford (Germany). Her feast day is 14 March.

== See also ==
- Saint Matilda of Ringelheim, patron saint archive

Matilda of Ringelheim Born: c. 894/97 Died: 968
Royal titles
Preceded by Hedwiga of Franconia	Duchess consort of Saxony; 912–936	Succeeded by Edith of Wessex
Preceded by Cunigunde of Swabia	German Queen; 919–936	Succeeded by Edith of Wessex
