= Thankmar =

Prince (c. 908–938)

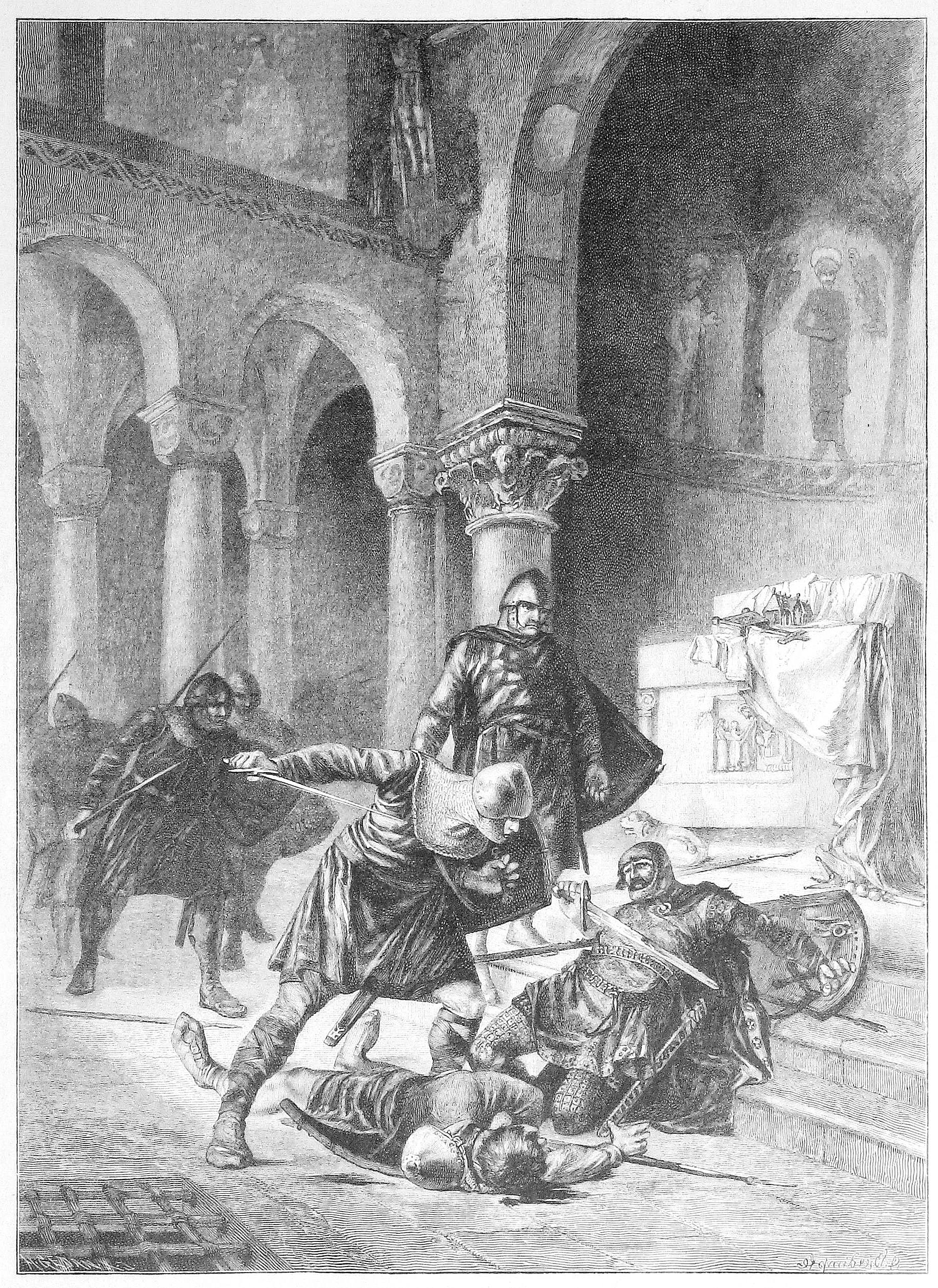
The death of Tankmaro

Thankmar (or Tankmaro, or Tammo) (c. 908 – 28 July 938) was the eldest son of Henry I of Germany (Henry the Fowler) and the only one that was born by his first wife, Hatheburg of Merseburg. His mother had been previously married and widowed, after which she entered a convent. Because she left the convent to marry Henry, her second marriage was considered invalid and the couple split. Thankmar's legitimacy was, therefore, in question.

Henry I then married Matilda of Ringelheim who bore him five more children, four of whom became (or married into) royalty and one (Bruno) who became Archbishop of Cologne: Hedwig, Otto, Gerbega, Henry, and Bruno. In 929, Henry I arranged for his succession and had the arrangement ratified by an assembly at Erfurt, a few year before his death. After his death, his lands and wealth were divided between his four sons: Thankmar, Otto, Henry, and Bruno.

Only Otto, however, was designated by his father to receive the crown, later becoming the Holy Roman Emperor known as Otto the Great. The only succession dispute was between Otto and his younger full brother Henry, who was kept under house arrest in Bavaria during Otto's coronation.

After the death of his cousin, Siegfried, Count of Merseburg (they were related in the maternal line), in 937, Thankmar claimed Merseburg. Otto, however, appointed Gero, Siegfried's brother as successor. During this dispute, Eberhard of Franconia and Wichmann the Elder revolted against Otto, and Thankmar joined them. Later, Thankmar was besieged in Eresburg. He was killed by a spear thrown through the window of the church of Saint Peter, while he was seeking refuge inside.

== Sources ==
- Reuter, Timothy. Germany in the Early Middle Ages 800–1056. New York: Longman, 1991.
- Bernhardt, John W. Itinerant Kingship and Royal Monasteries in Early Medieval Germany, c. 936–1075. Cambridge: Cambridge University Press, 1993.
