= Pöhlde Abbey =

Monastery

Coordinates: 51°36′47″N 10°18′32″E

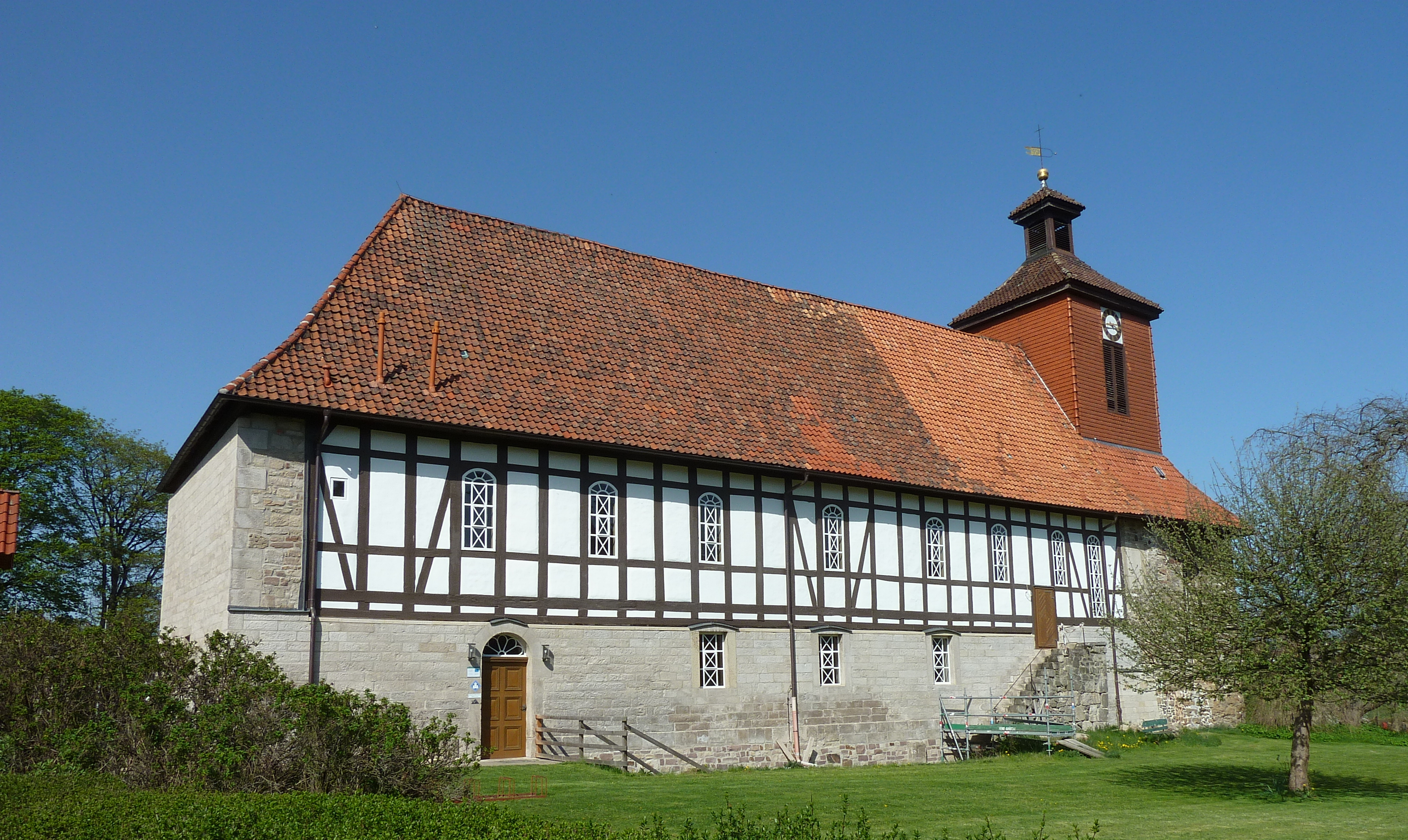
Pöhlde church

Pöhlde Abbey was a Premonstratensian (previously Benedictine) monastery at Pöhlde, now a small village and part of the town of Herzberg am Harz, in Lower Saxony, Germany.

== History ==
The lands of Pöhlde were given in dower in c 927 to Queen Matilda by her husband, Henry I the Fowler (d. 936). This is the earliest-written record of the place.

Dedicated to Saint John the Baptist and Saint Servatius, the abbey was founded in 952 by Matilda and received generous endowments from her son, Emperor Otto I. It benefited greatly from its close connection to the imperial palace then also situated at Pöhlde, and for a time was one of the wealthiest monasteries in Germany.

The foundation was originally for Canons regular, but it adopted the Rule of St. Benedict in 952. In 1131 it joined the Premonstratensian Order.

In 1200 the old Romanesque church burnt down. Its Gothic successor was consecrated in 1240.

In 1525 both church and monastery were destroyed by peasants from Eichsfeld in the Peasants' War. The monks moved to Duderstadt. In 1533 in the Reformation Duke Philip of Grubenhagen dissolved the abbey and took over its property.

In 1629 a brief attempt to revive the abbey ended in failure. Later in the Thirty Years' War what little remained on the site was completely destroyed. After the return of peace the present half-timbered village church was built on the foundations of the nave of the destroyed abbey church.

== Present site ==
There are no visible traces of the abbey left. Between 1971 and 1974 the remains of the abbey were uncovered during archaeological excavations, but for their better preservation were covered over again. The remains of the palace, to which the abbey buildings were physically connected, were also excavated at about the same time, but were also covered over again.
