= Eberhard of Franconia =

Duke of Franconia from 918 to 939 AD

Eberhard
- Duke of Franconia
- Reign: 918–939
- Born: c. 885
- Died: 2 October 939; Andernach, Lotharingia
- Noble family: Conradines
- Father: Conrad the Elder
- Mother: Glismut of Carinthia

Eberhard (c. 885 – 2 October 939), a member of the Conradine dynasty, was Duke of Franconia, succeeding his elder brother, King Conrad I, in December 918. From 926 to 928, he also acted as ruler of Lotharingia.

== Life ==
Eberhard was the second son of Conrad the Elder and his wife Glismut (d. 924), probably an illegitimate daughter of the Carolingian emperor Arnulf of Carinthia. The Conradines, counts in the Franconian Lahngau region, had been loyal supporters of the Carolingians. At the same time, they competed vigorously for predominance in Franconia with the sons of the Babenberg duke Henry of Franconia at Bamberg Castle.

In 906 the two parties battled each other near Fritzlar. Conrad the Elder was killed, as were two of the three Babenberg brothers. The Babenberg feud ended when King Louis the Child took the Conradines' side, and Conrad the Younger became the undisputed duke of all Franconia.

Upon the early death of King Louis in 911, the Saxon, Swabian, and Bavarian princes elected Conrad the Younger King of East Francia. Under the rule of his brother, Eberhard appeared from 913 as count in the Franconian Hessengau and Persgau, and in 913 and 928 also as count in the Upper Lahngau. He supported his brother against the rival dukes Arnulf of Bavaria and Henry of Saxony.

In 914 he assumed the office of a Franconian margrave; nevertheless, unable to assert his claims, he had to witness Henry's conquest of the Thuringian lands of the late Duke Burchard.

On his deathbed in Forchheim in December 918, King Conrad assembled the German princes to arrange his succession. According to the medieval chronicler Widukind of Corvey, he persuaded Eberhard to forgo any ambition for the German crown and to urge the electors to choose his former rival, the Ottonian duke Henry the Fowler, as his successor. Eberhard was assigned to personally hand over the royal insignia to Henry at the Diet, which was held in May 919 in Fritzlar. Conrad considered this to be the only way to end the long-standing feud between Saxons and Franks and to prevent the dissolution of the Empire into smaller states based on the German stem duchies.

Eberhard succeeded his brother as Duke of Franconia and remained a loyal supporter of the new king Henry I. After Henry had reconquered the troubled and restless Duchy of Lotharingia, he also conferred upon him the office of regent in 926. Eberhard quickly stabilized the Lotharingian lands and ruled until 928, when King Henry enfeoffed his son-in-law Gilbert, the husband of his daughter Gerberga.

After Henry's death, however, Eberhard soon came into conflict with the king's son and successor Otto I, who aimed at strengthening royal authority. In 937 the Franconian duke invested Helmern Castle near Peckelsheim, located near the Saxon border and garrisoned by a Saxon burgrave who refused to swear fealty to any non-Saxon.

King Otto called the feuding parties to a royal court at Magdeburg, where Eberhard was ordered to pay a fine and his lieutenants were sentenced to carry dead dogs in public, a particularly dishonouring punishment. Infuriated, Eberhard joined Otto's opponents, raising a rebellion in 938 with Otto's half-brother Thankmar and the new Duke Eberhard of Bavaria, the late Duke Arnulf's son.

The revolt was soon suppressed; Thankmar was assassinated at Eresburg Castle, and Eberhard of Bavaria was replaced by his uncle Berthold as duke (ruled 938–945).

Following a brief reconciliation with King Otto, Eberhard then allied himself with Duke Gilbert of Lorraine, Archbishop Frederick of Mainz, and Henry, Otto's younger brother, in a new uprising. Their united forces posed a serious threat to Otto's rule; nevertheless, on 2 October 939, the rebels were finally defeated in the Battle of Andernach.

Eberhard of Franconia was killed, allegedly by his Conradine relative Count Odo of Wetterau, whereafter his duchy was seized and remained a direct Imperial possession until its dissolution in 1039.

Eberhard of Franconia Conradines Born: ca. 885 Died: 2 October 939
Preceded by Conrad the Younger	Duke of Franconia; 918–939	Vacant Title next held by Conrad the Red as Count in Franconia
