= Gilbert, Duke of Lorraine =

Duke of Lorraine (died 939)

Gilbert
- Duke of Lorraine
- Died: 2 October 939 (aged 49)
- Noble family: House of Reginar
- Spouse: Gerberga of Saxony
- Issue: Henry; Alberade; Hedwige; Gerberge
- Father: Reginar, Duke of Lorraine
- Mother: Alberada

Gilbert (or Giselbert) (died 2 October 939) was son of Reginar and the brother-in-law of Emperor Otto I. He was duke of Lotharingia (or Lorraine) until 939. Gilbert was also lay abbot of Echternach, Stablo-Malmedy, St Servatius of Maastricht, and St Maximin of Trier.

The beginning of the reign of Gilbert is not clear. A dux Lotharingiae is mentioned in 910 and this may have been Gilbert. Lotharingia sided with Charles III in 911, who was deposed in West Francia in 922 by Robert but remained king in Lotharingia, from where he tried to reconquer West Francia until being imprisoned in 923. In 923, Gilbert and Archbishop Ruotger of Trier invited the Ottonian king Henry I to invade Lotharingia. In 924, Gilbert changed his allegiance over to the West Frankish king Rudolf. After Henry managed to occupy Lotharingia in 925, Gilbert swore fealty to him and Henry transferred the abbey of St Servatius of Maastricht (which had been taken from him and given to the church of Trier in 919) to Gilbert. To secure their relationship, Gilbert was also married to Henry's daughter, Gerberga of Saxony.

Following Henry's death in 936, Gilbert rebelled against the former's son, Otto I in 939, changing his allegiance to the West Frankish king, Louis IV. Gilbert managed to be practically independent for three years until he was defeated by the army of Otto I in 939 at the Battle of Andernach. Gilbert was made prisoner, but managed to escape; while fleeing, he drowned trying to cross the Rhine. Lorraine was given to Henry I, Duke of Bavaria.

Preceded by Reginar	Duke of Lotharingia; 915–939	Succeeded by Henry
