= Synods of Augsburg =

From the time of Boniface, especially during periods of revival of religious and ecclesiastical life, synods were frequently convened by the bishops of Germany, and sometimes by those of individual ecclesiastical provinces. As the German bishops were, on the one hand, princes of the Holy Roman Empire, and the emperor was, on the other, the superior protector of the Roman Church, these synods came to have no little importance in the general ecclesiastical and political development of Western Christendom. Two general imperial synods were held in Augsburg.

The first, convened in August 952, through the efforts of Emperor Otto the Great, provided for the reform of abuses in civil and ecclesiastical life. Frederick, Archbishop of Mainz presided, and three archbishops and twenty bishops of Germany and northern Italy took part. Eleven canons were promulgated concerning ecclesiastical life and other matters of church discipline.

A similar synod, convened by Anno II, Archbishop of Cologne (27 October 1062), was concerned with the internal conditions of the empire and the attitude of the Church of Germany towards the schism of Cadalus, antipope during the reign of Alexander II.

The diocesan synods of Augsburg correspond as a rule with the synodal system as carried out in other parts of Germany. In this diocese, as elsewhere in Germany, the synodi per villas, convened under the influence of the Carolingian capitularies. They were visitation-synods, held by the bishop assisted by the archdeacon and the local lord or baron (Gaugraf). Their purpose was inquisitorial and judicial. After the time of Ulrich of Augsburg (923–973), and in close relation to the system of provincial councils, diocesan synods were held at stated times, chiefly in connection with matters of ecclesiastical administration (legalizing of important grants and privileges, etc.) and the settlement of disputes. After the 13th century, these diocesan synods assumed more of a legislative character; decrees were issued regulating the lives of both ecclesiastics and laymen, and church discipline was secured by the publication of diocesan statutes. The earliest extant are of Bishop Friedrich (1309–1331). These diocesan synods fell into decay during the course of the 14th century.

In consequence of decrees of the Council of Basle the synods of the Diocese of Augsburg rose again to importance so that after the middle of the 15th century they were once more frequently held, as for example: by the able Bishop Peter von Schauenburg (1424–69) and his successor, Johann von Werdenburg, also by Friedrich von Zollern (1486) and Heinrich von Liechtenau (1506). The two Bishops Christopher von Stadion (1517–43) and Otto Truchsess von Waldburg (1543–73) made use of diocesan synods (1517, 1520, 1543 in Dillingen, and 1536 in Augsburg) for the purpose of checking the progress of the Reformation through the improvement of ecclesiastical life. At a later period, there were but few ecclesiastical assemblies of this kind; as early as 1567, the synod of that year, convened for the purpose of carrying out the reforms instituted by the Council of Trent, shows signs of the decline of the synod as a diocesan institution. The Bishops of Augsburg were, moreover, not only the ecclesiastical superiors of their diocese, but after the 10th century possessed the Regalia, the right of holding and administering royal fiefs with concomitant jurisdiction. The right of coinage was obtained by Ulrich. At a later period, disputes were frequent between the bishops and the civic authorities, which culminated in an agreement (1389) by which the city was made practically independent of the episcopal authority.

== Bibliography ==
- Hermann Joseph Hartzheim, Concilia Germaniae (Cologne, 1749).
- C. J. Hefele, Conciliengeschichte (2d ed. Freiburg, 1873).
- Joseph Anton Steiner, Synodi dioecesis Augustanae (1766).
- Anton von Steichele, Das Bistum Augsburg historisch und statistisch beschrieben (Augsburg, 1864).
- Johann Schmidt (Theologe, 1594) in Kirchenlexikon, I, 1651–1655.
