= William (archbishop of Mainz) =

Archbishop of Mainz (929–968)

- Archbishop of Mainz
- Church: Catholic Church
- Diocese: Electorate of Mainz
- In office: 954–968

Personal details
- Born: 929
- Died: 2 March 968

William (929 – 2 March 968) was Archbishop of Mainz from 17 December 954 until his death. He was the son of the Emperor Otto I the Great and a Wendish mother.

On 17 December 954, he was appointed to the archbishopric of Mainz following the death of the rebellious former archbishop Frederick. William received confirmation from Pope Agapetus II and also the title of Apostolic Vicar of Germany, a title which made the archbishops of Mainz the pope's deputies in Germany and granted the archdiocese of Mainz the title of Holy See. From his father, William also received the title of "Arch-Chaplain of the Empire."

William died at Rottleberode in 968 and was buried in St. Alban's Abbey, Mainz.

Preceded by Frederick	Archbishop of Mainz; 954–968	Succeeded by Hatto II
