= Frederick (archbishop of Mainz) =

Archbishop of Mainz (died 954)

- Archbishop of Mainz
- Church: Catholic Church
- Diocese: Electorate of Mainz
- In office: 937–954

Personal details
- Died: October 954

Frederick (died October 954) was the Archbishop of Mainz from 937, following the late Hildebert, until his death. He was a son of Reginar, Duke of Lorraine.

Immediately, Frederick acted as an opponent of Otto the Great, one of the most consistent opponents he faced. In 939, he joined the rebellion of Eberhard III of Franconia, Gilbert of Lorraine, and Henry I of Bavaria. He was imprisoned in Hammelburg for a while. He plotted with Henry to assassinate Otto in Easter 941 in Quedlinburg, but they were discovered and put in captivity in Ingelheim, being released and pardoned only after doing penance at Christmas of that year.

Frederick refused to accompany Otto to Italy in 951. He participated in another rebellion with Liudolf, Duke of Swabia, and Conrad, Duke of Lorraine, luring the king to Mainz in 953. Abandoned by the Lorrainers and without Henry's support this time, the rebels were easily crushed and punished. Frederick tried to distance himself from the fighting, but died before anything could come to him.

== Sources ==
- Peter Herde (1961). "Friedrich, Erzbischof von Mainz". Neue Deutsche Biographie (in German). Vol. 5. Berlin: Duncker & Humblot. pp. 516–517. (full text online).
- Ernst Dümmler (1877). "Friedrich, Erzbischof von Mainz" . Allgemeine Deutsche Biographie (in German). Vol. 7. Leipzig: Duncker & Humblot. pp. 549–552.

Preceded by Hildebert	Archbishop of Mainz; 937–954	Succeeded by William
