= Otto the Great =

Holy Roman Emperor from 962 to 973

- Imperator Romanorum
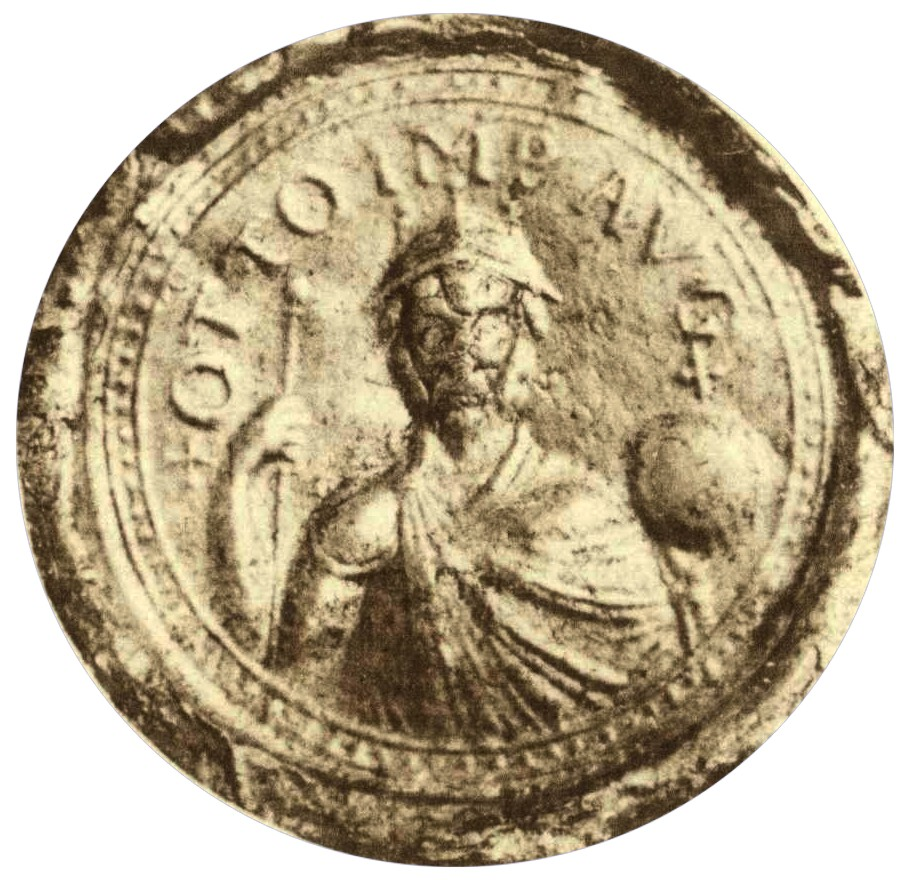
- Depiction of Otto on his seal in 968 with the inscription OTTO IMP AVG (Otto Imperator Augustus)

Holy Roman Emperor
- Reign: 2 February 962 – 7 May 973
- Coronation: 2 February 962; Rome
- Predecessor: Berengar I (as Emperor in Italy)
- Successor: Otto II

King of Italy
- Reign: 25 December 961 – 7 May 973
- Coronation: 23 September 951 (Note: Berengar II ruled from 952 to 961 as "King of Italy" but as Otto's vassal.); Pavia
- Predecessor: Berengar II
- Successor: Otto II

King of East Francia
- Reign: 2 July 936 – 7 May 973
- Coronation: 7 August 936; Aachen Cathedral
- Predecessor: Henry the Fowler
- Successor: Otto II

Duke of Saxony
- Reign: 2 July 936 – 7 May 973
- Predecessor: Henry the Fowler
- Successor: Bernard I
- Born: 23 November 912; Possibly Wallhausen, East Francia
- Died: 7 May 973 (aged 60); Memleben, Holy Roman Empire
- Burial: Magdeburg Cathedral
- Spouses: Eadgyth of England (m. 930, died 946) Adelaide of Italy (m. 951)
- Issue: William, Archbishop of Mainz; Liutgarde, Duchess of Lorraine; Liudolf, Duke of Swabia; Matilda, Abbess of Quedlinburg; Otto II, Holy Roman Emperor
- Dynasty: Ottonian
- Father: Henry the Fowler
- Mother: Matilda of Ringelheim
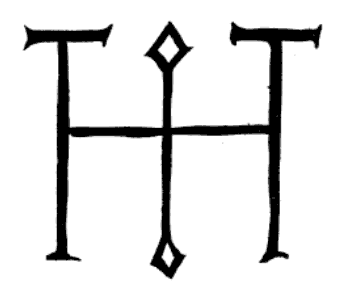
- Signum manus

Otto I (23 November 912 – 7 May 973), known as Otto the Great (German: Otto der Große; Italian: Ottone il Grande) or Otto of Saxony (German: Otto von Sachsen; Italian: Ottone di Sassonia), was an East Frankish (German) king from 936 and Holy Roman Emperor from 962 until his death in 973. (Note: The precise terms King of the Germans and Holy Roman Empire were not in common use until, respectively, the 11th and the 12th centuries.) He was the eldest son of Henry the Fowler and Matilda of Ringelheim.

Otto inherited the Duchy of Saxony and the kingship of the Germans upon his father's death in 936. He continued his father's work of unifying all German tribes into a single kingdom and greatly expanded the king's powers at the expense of the aristocracy. Through strategic marriages and personal appointments, Otto installed members of his family in the kingdom's most important duchies. This reduced the various dukes, who had previously been co-equals with the king, to royal subjects under his authority. Otto transformed the church in Germany to strengthen royal authority and subjected its clergy to his personal control.

After putting down a brief civil war among the rebellious duchies, Otto defeated the Magyars at the Battle of Lechfeld in 955, thus ending the Hungarian invasions of Western Europe. The victory against the pagan Magyars earned Otto a reputation as a savior of Christendom and secured his hold over the kingdom. By 961, Otto had conquered the Kingdom of Italy. Following the example of Charlemagne's coronation as "Emperor of the Romans" in 800, Otto was crowned emperor in 962 by Pope John XII in Rome.

Otto's later years were marked by conflicts with the papacy and struggles to stabilize his rule over Italy. Reigning from Rome, Otto sought to improve relations with the Byzantine Empire, which opposed his claim to emperorship and his realm's further expansion to the south. To resolve this conflict, the Byzantine princess Theophanu married his son Otto II in April 972. Otto finally returned to Germany in August 972 and died at Memleben in May 973. Otto II succeeded him.

Otto has been consistently depicted in historiography through different eras as a successful ruler. He is also reputed to be a great military commander, especially on the strategic level – this also means that the empire this talent recreated was too vast for contemporary administrative structures and could only be governed as a confederacy. Modern historians, while not denying his strong character and his many fruitful initiatives, explore the emperor's capability as a consensus builder – a process that goes in parallel with greater recognition of the nature of consensus politics in medieval Europe (especially Western and Central parts) as well as different roles played by other actors in his time.

Historian David Bachrach notes the role of the bureaucracy and administration apparatus which the Ottonians inherited from the Carolingians and ultimately from the Ancient Romans, and which they developed greatly themselves: "It was the success of the Ottonians in molding the raw materials bequeathed to them into a formidable military machine that made possible the establishment of Germany as the preeminent kingdom in Europe from the tenth through the mid-thirteenth century." Bachrach highlights in particular the achievements of the first two Ottonian rulers, Henry I and Otto the Great in creating this situation. Their rules also marked the start of new, vigorous literary traditions. The patronage of Otto and his immediate successors facilitated a so-called "Ottonian Renaissance" of arts and architecture. As one of the most notable Holy Roman emperors, Otto's footprint in artistic depictions is also considerable.

== Early life ==
=== Birth and family ===
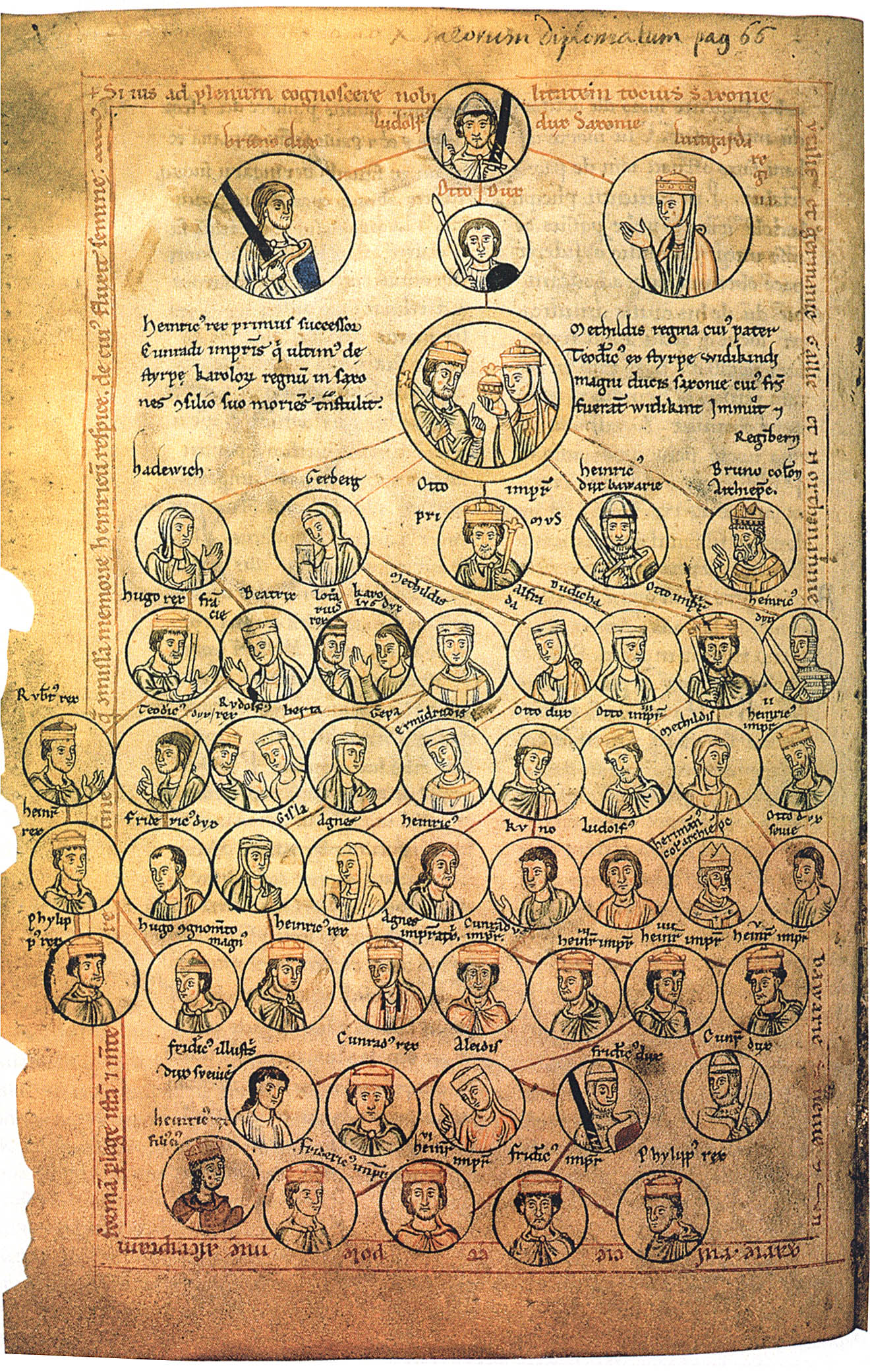
Genealogy of the Ottonians from the 13th century Chronica sancti Pantaleonis. Heinricus rex and Methildis regina can be seen in the double circle with Otto directly below them.

Otto was born on 23 November 912, the oldest son of the Duke of Saxony, Henry the Fowler and his second wife Matilda, the daughter of Dietrich of Ringelheim, a Saxon count in Westphalia. Henry had previously married Hatheburg of Merseburg, also a daughter of a Saxon count, in 906, but this marriage was annulled, probably in 909 after she had given birth to Henry's first son, Otto's half-brother Thankmar. Otto had four full siblings: Hedwig, Gerberga, Henry and Bruno.

=== Rise of the Ottonians ===
On 23 December 918, Conrad I, King of East Francia and Duke of Franconia, died. According to The Deeds of the Saxons (originally titled in Latin as Res gestae saxonicae sive annalium libri tres) by the Saxon chronicler Widukind of Corvey, Conrad persuaded his younger brother Eberhard of Franconia, the presumptive heir, to offer the crown of East Francia to Otto's father Henry. Although Conrad and Henry had been at odds with one another since 912, Henry had not openly opposed the king since 915. Furthermore, Conrad's repeated battles with German dukes, most recently with Arnulf, Duke of Bavaria, and Burchard II, Duke of Swabia, had weakened the position and resources of the Conradines. After several months of hesitation, Eberhard and the other Frankish and Saxon nobles elected Henry as king at the Imperial Diet of Fritzlar in May 919. For the first time, a Saxon instead of a Frank reigned over the kingdom.

Burchard II of Swabia soon swore fealty to the new king, but Arnulf of Bavaria did not recognize Henry's position. According to the Annales iuvavenses, Arnulf was elected king by the Bavarians in opposition to Henry, but his "reign" was short-lived; Henry defeated him in two campaigns. In 921, Henry besieged Arnulf's residence at Ratisbon (Regensburg) and forced him into submission. Arnulf had to accept Henry's sovereignty; Bavaria retained some autonomy and the right to invest bishops in the Bavarian church.

=== Heir apparent ===
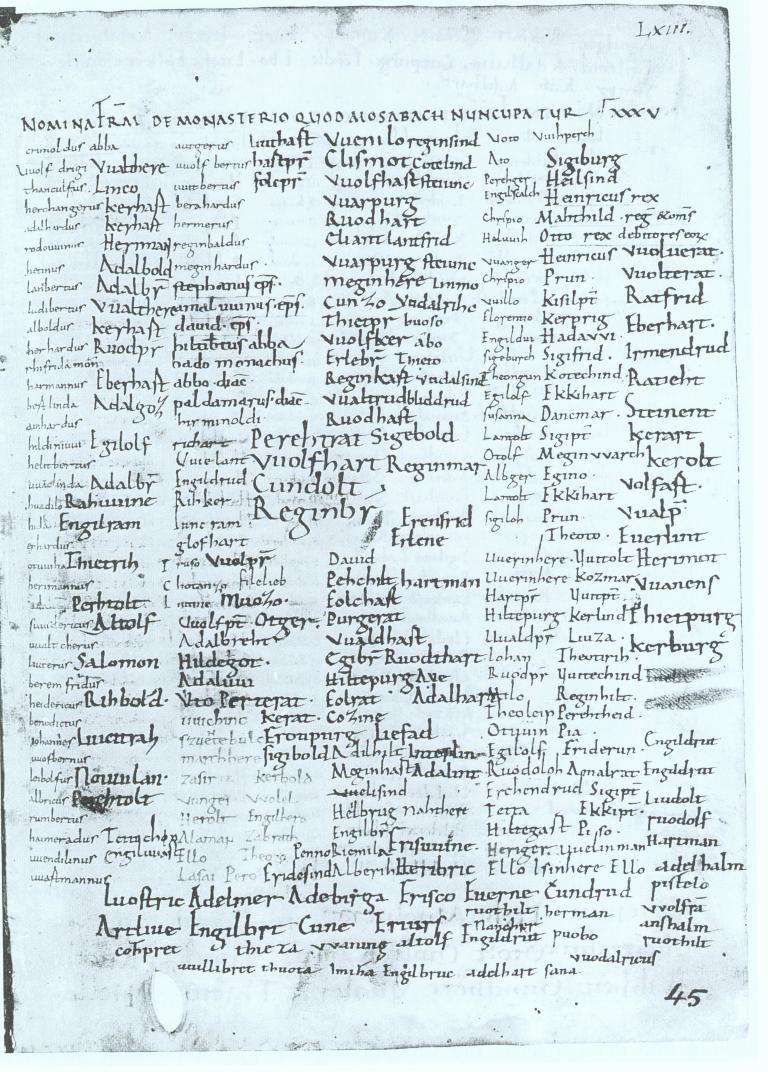
The confraternity book of the Abbey of Reichenau records the names of the Ottonian family and their most important helpers from 929. In the second column from the right Heinricus rex and his wife Mathild[e] reg[ina] are listed, then their eldest son Otto rex, already with the title of king.

Otto first gained experience as a military commander when the German kingdom fought against Wendish tribes on its eastern border. While campaigning against the Wends/West Slavs in 929, Otto's illegitimate son William, the future Archbishop of Mainz, was born to a captive Wendish noblewoman. With Henry's dominion over the entire kingdom secured by 929, the king probably began to prepare his succession over the kingdom. No written evidence for his arrangements is extant, but during this time Otto is first called king (Latin: rex) in the confraternity book of the Abbey of Reichenau.

While Henry consolidated power within Germany, he also prepared for an alliance with Anglo-Saxon England by finding a bride for Otto. Association with another royal house would give Henry additional legitimacy and strengthen the bonds between the two Saxon kingdoms. To seal the alliance, King Æthelstan of England sent Henry two of his half-sisters, so he could choose the one which best pleased him. Henry selected Eadgyth as Otto's bride and the two were married in 930.

Several years later, shortly before Henry's death, an Imperial Diet at Erfurt formally ratified the king's succession arrangements. Some of his estates and treasures were to be distributed among Thankmar, Henry, and Bruno. But departing from customary Carolingian inheritance, the king designated Otto as the sole heir apparent without a prior formal election by the various dukes.

== Reign as king ==
=== Coronation ===
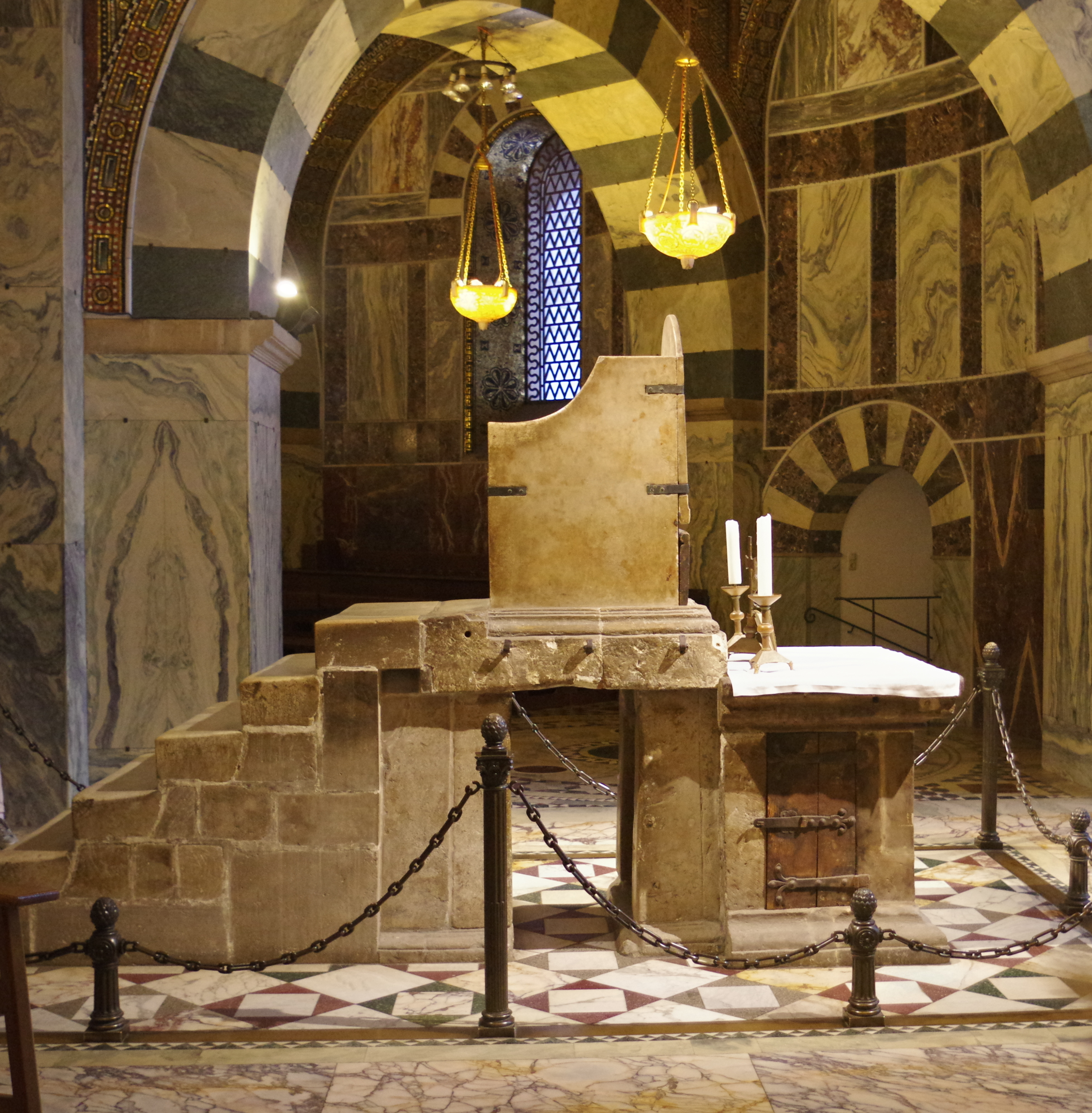
Side view of the Throne of Charlemagne at Aachen Cathedral, where Otto was crowned King of Germany in 936

Henry died from the effects of a cerebral stroke on 2 July 936 at his palace, the Kaiserpfalz in Memleben, and was buried at Quedlinburg Abbey. At the time of his death, all of the various German tribes were united in a single realm. At the age of almost 24, Otto assumed his father's position as Duke of Saxony and King of Germany. His coronation was held on 7 August 936 in Charlemagne's former capital of Aachen, where Otto was anointed and crowned by Hildebert, the Archbishop of Mainz. Though he was a Saxon by birth, Otto appeared at the coronation in Frankish dress in an attempt to demonstrate his sovereignty over the Duchy of Lotharingia and his role as true successor to Charlemagne, whose last heirs in East Francia had died out in 911.

According to Widukind of Corvey, Otto had the four other dukes of the kingdom (from the duchies of Franconia, Swabia, Bavaria and Lorraine) act as his personal attendants at the coronation banquet: Arnulf I of Bavaria as marshal (or stablemaster), Herman I, Duke of Swabia as cupbearer, Eberhard of Franconia as steward (or seneschal) and Gilbert of Lorraine as Chamberlain. (Note: Widukind of Corvey, Res gestae saxonicae (in Latin) Book 2, chapter 2: "...; duces vero ministrabant. Lothariorum dux Isilberhtus, ad cuius potestatem locus ille pertinebat, omnia procurabat; Evurhardus mensae preerat, Herimannus Franco pincernis, Arnulfus equestri ordini et eligendis locandisque castris preerat; Sigifridus vero, Saxonum optimus et a rege secundus, gener quondam regis, tunc vero affinitate coniunctus, eo tempore procurabat Saxoniam, ne qua hostium interim irruptio accidisset, nutriensque iuniorem Heinricum secum tenuit." Bibliotheca Augustana.) By performing this traditional service, the dukes signaled cooperation with the new king, and clearly showed their submission to his reign.

Despite his peaceful transition, the royal family was not harmonious during his early reign. Otto's younger brother Henry also claimed the throne, contrary to his father's wishes. According to her biography, Vita Mathildis reginae posterior, their mother had favored Henry as king: in contrast to Otto, Henry had been "born in the purple" during his father's reign and shared his name.

Otto also faced internal opposition from various local aristocrats. In 936, Otto appointed Hermann Billung as Margrave, granting him authority over a march north of the Elbe River between the Limes Saxoniae and Peene Rivers. As military governor, Hermann extracted tribute from the Polabian Slavs inhabiting the area and often fought against the Western Slavic tribes of the Lutici, Obotrites, and Wagri. Hermann's appointment angered his brother, Count Wichmann the Elder. As the elder and wealthier of the two, Wichmann believed his claim to the office was superior to his brother's. Additionally, Wichmann was related by marriage to the dowager queen Matilda. In 937, Otto further offended the nobility through his appointment of Gero to succeed his older brother Siegfried as Count and Margrave of a vast border region around Merseburg that abutted the Wends on the lower Saale. His decision frustrated Thankmar, Otto's half-brother and Siegfried's cousin, who felt that he held a greater right to the appointment.

=== Rebellion of the dukes ===
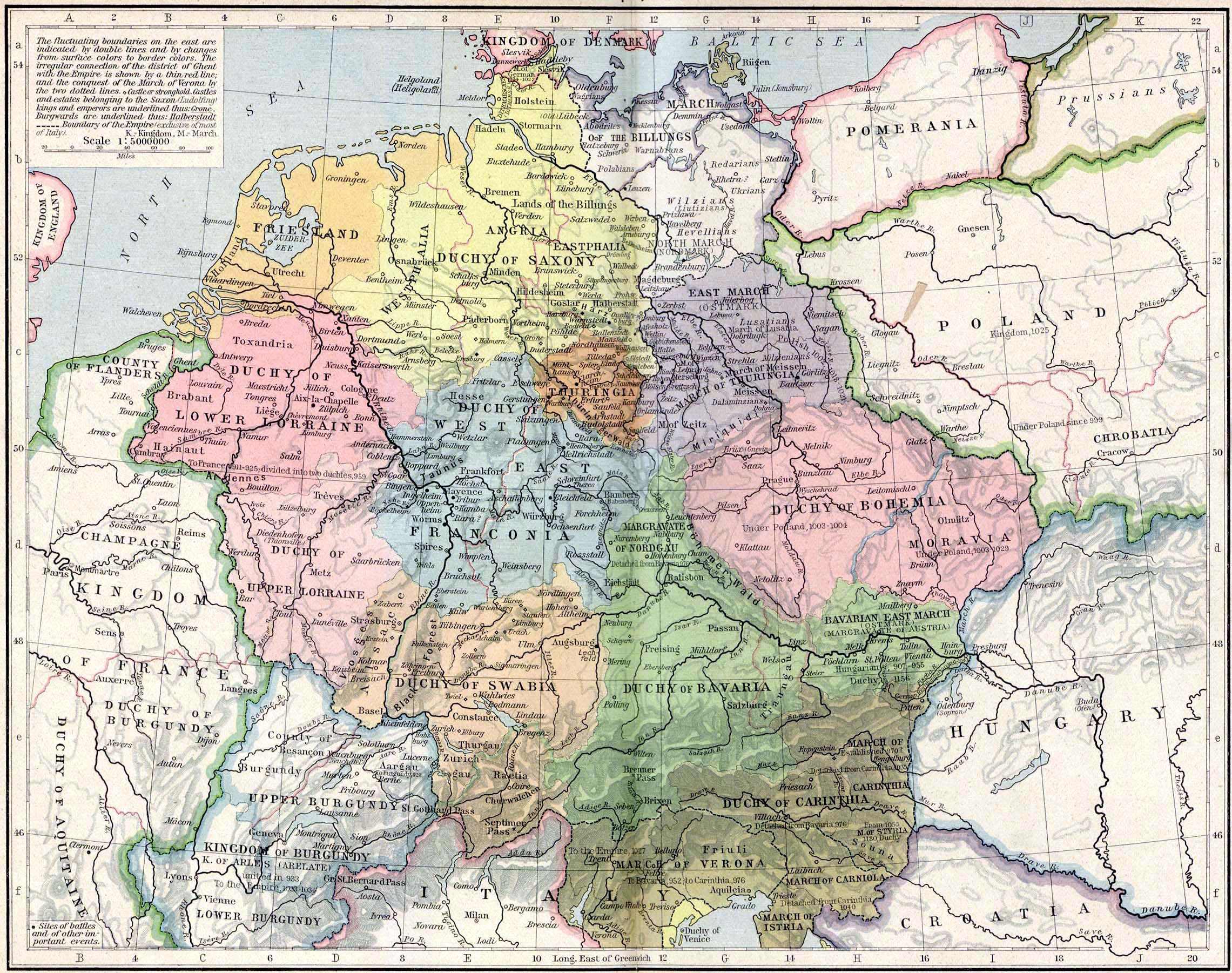
Central Europe, 919–1125. The Kingdom of Germany included the duchies of Saxony (yellow), Franconia (blue), Bavaria (green), Swabia (orange) and Lorraine (pink left). Various dukes rebelled against Otto's rule in 937 and again in 939.

Arnulf, Duke of Bavaria, died in 937 and was succeeded by his son Eberhard. The new duke quickly came into conflict with Otto, as Eberhard opposed the king's sovereignty over Bavaria under the peace treaty between King Henry and Arnulf. Refusing to recognize Otto's supremacy, Eberhard rebelled against the king. In two campaigns in the spring and fall of 938, Otto defeated and exiled Eberhard from the kingdom and stripped him of his titles. In his place, Otto appointed Eberhard's uncle Berthold, a count in the March of Carinthia, as the new Duke of Bavaria on the condition that Berthold would recognize Otto as the sole authority to appoint bishops and to administer royal property within the duchy.

At the same time, Otto had to settle a dispute between Bruning, a Saxon noble, and Duke Eberhard of Franconia, the brother of the former king Conrad I of Germany. After the rise of a Saxon to kingship, Bruning, a local lord with possessions in the borderland between Franconia and Saxony, refused to swear fealty to any non-Saxon ruler. Eberhard attacked Bruning's Helmern castle near Peckelsheim, killed all of its inhabitants and burned it down. The king called the feuding parties to his court at Magdeburg, where Eberhard was ordered to pay a fine, and his lieutenants were sentenced to carry dead dogs in public, which was considered a particularly shameful punishment.

Infuriated with Otto's actions, Eberhard joined Otto's half-brother Thankmar, Count Wichmann, and Archbishop Frederick of Mainz and rebelled against the king in 938. Duke Herman I of Swabia, one of Otto's closest advisors, warned him of the rebellion and the king moved quickly to put down the revolt. Wichmann was soon reconciled with Otto and joined the king's forces against his former allies. Otto besieged Thankmar at Eresburg and although the latter surrendered, he was killed by a common soldier named Maincia or Meginzo at the altar of the Church of St. Peter. Otto mourned his half-brother and praised his courage but the killer was not punished. Following their defeats, Eberhard and Frederick sought reconciliation with the king. Otto pardoned both after a brief exile in Hildesheim and restored them to their former positions.

=== War in France ===
Shortly after his reconciliation, Eberhard planned a second rebellion against Otto. He promised to assist Otto's younger brother Henry in claiming the throne and recruited Gilbert, Duke of Lorraine, to join the rebellion. Gilbert was married to Otto's sister Gerberga of Saxony, but had sworn fealty to King Louis IV of West Francia. Otto exiled Henry from East Francia, and he fled to the court of King Louis. The West Frankish king, in hopes of regaining dominion over Lorraine once again, joined forces with Henry and Gilbert. In response, Otto allied with Louis's chief antagonist, Hugh the Great, Count of Paris, and husband of Otto's sister Hedwige.

Henry captured Merseburg and planned to join Gilbert in Lorraine, but Otto besieged them at Chevremont near Liège. Before he could defeat them, he was forced to abandon the siege and moved against Louis, who had seized Verdun. Otto subsequently drove Louis back to his capital at Laon.

While Otto gained some initial victories against the rebels, he was unable to capture the conspirators and end the rebellion. Archbishop Frederick sought to mediate peace between the combatants, but Otto rejected his proposal. Under Otto's direction, Duke Herman of Swabia led an army against the conspirators into Franconia and Lorraine. Otto recruited allies from the Duchy of Alsace who crossed the Rhine River and surprised Eberhard and Gilbert at the Battle of Andernach on 2 October 939. Otto's forces claimed an overwhelming victory: Eberhard was killed in battle, and Gilbert drowned in the Rhine while attempting to escape. Left alone to face his brother, Henry submitted to Otto and the rebellion ended. With Eberhard dead, Otto assumed direct rule over the Duchy of Franconia and dissolved it into smaller counties and bishoprics accountable directly to him. The same year, Otto made peace with Louis IV, whereby Louis recognized his suzerainty over Lorraine. In return Otto withdrew his army and arranged for his sister Gerberga (the widow of Gilbert) to marry Louis IV.

In 940, Otto and Henry were reconciled through the efforts of their mother. Henry returned to East Francia, and Otto appointed him as the new Duke of Lorraine to succeed Gilbert. Henry had not dropped his ambitions for the German throne and initiated another conspiracy against his older brother. With the assistance of Archbishop Frederick of Mainz, Henry planned to have Otto assassinated on Easter Day, 941, at Quedlinburg Abbey. Otto discovered the plot and had the conspirators arrested and imprisoned at Ingelheim. The king later released and pardoned both men only after they publicly performed penance on Christmas Day that same year.

=== Consolidation of power ===
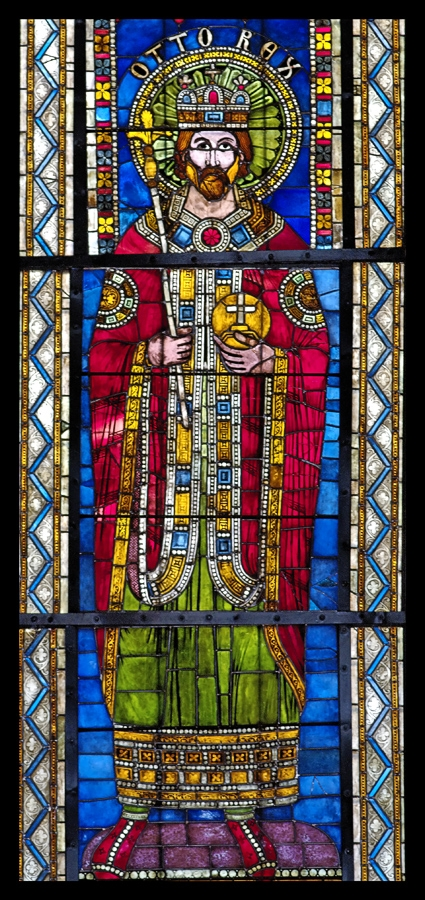
12th-century stained glass depiction of Otto I, Strasbourg Cathedral

The decade between 941 and 951 was marked by Otto's exercise of undisputed domestic power. Through the subordination of the dukes under his authority, Otto asserted his power to make decisions without their prior agreement. He deliberately ignored the claims and ranks of the nobility, who wanted dynastic succession in the assignment of office, by freely appointing individuals of his choice to the kingdom's offices. Loyalty to Otto, not lineage, was the pathway towards advancement under his rule. His mother Matilda disapproved of this policy and was accused by Otto's royal advisers of undermining his authority. After Otto briefly exiled her to her Westphalian manors at Enger in 947, Matilda was brought back to court at the urging of his wife Eadgyth.

The nobility found it difficult to adapt to Otto, as the kingdom had never before followed individual succession to the throne. Whereas tradition dictated that all the sons of the former king were to receive a portion of the kingdom, Henry's succession plan placed Otto at the head of a united kingdom at the expense of his brothers. Otto's authoritarian style was in stark contrast to that of his father. Henry had purposely waived Church anointment at coronation as a symbol of his election by his people and governing his kingdom on the basis of "friendship pacts" (Latin: amicitia). Henry regarded the kingdom as a confederation of duchies and saw himself as a first among equals. Instead of seeking to administer the kingdom through royal representatives, as Charlemagne had done, Henry allowed the dukes to maintain complete internal control of their holdings as long as his superior status was recognized. Otto, on the other hand, had accepted Church anointment and regarded his kingdom as a feudal monarchy with himself holding the "divine right" to rule it. He reigned without concern for the internal hierarchy of the various kingdoms' noble families.

This new policy ensured Otto's position as undisputed master of the kingdom. Members of his family and other aristocrats who rebelled against Otto were forced to confess their guilt publicly and unconditionally surrender to him, hoping for a pardon from their king. For nobles and other high-ranking officials, Otto's punishments were typically mild and the punished were usually restored to a position of authority afterwards. His brother Henry rebelled twice and was pardoned twice after his surrenders. He was even appointed Duke of Lorraine and later Duke of Bavaria. Rebellious commoners were treated far more harshly; Otto usually had them executed.

Otto continued to reward loyal vassals for their service throughout his tenure as king. Although appointments were still gained and held at his discretion, they were increasingly intertwined with dynastic politics. Where Henry relied upon "friendship pacts", Otto relied upon family ties. Otto refused to accept uncrowned rulers as his equal. Under Otto, the integration of important vassals took place through marriage connections. King Louis IV of France had married Otto's sister Gerberga in 939, and Otto's son Liudolf had married Ida, the daughter of Hermann I, Duke of Swabia, in 947. The former dynastically tied the royal house of West Francia to that of East Francia, and the latter secured his son's succession to the Duchy of Swabia, as Hermann had no sons. Otto's plans came to fruition when, in 950, Liudolf became Duke of Swabia, and in 954 Otto's nephew Lothair of France became King of France.

In 944, Otto appointed Conrad the Red as Duke of Lorraine and brought him into his extended family through his marriage to Otto's daughter Liutgarde in 947. A Salian Frank by birth, Conrad was a nephew of former king Conrad I of Germany. Following the death of Otto's uncle Berthold, Duke of Bavaria, in 947, Otto satisfied his brother Henry's ambition through his marriage to Judith, Duchess of Bavaria, daughter of Arnulf, Duke of Bavaria, and appointed him as the new Duke of Bavaria in 948. This arrangement finally achieved peace between the brothers, as Henry thereafter abandoned his claims to the throne. Through his familial ties to the dukes, Otto had strengthened the sovereignty of the crown and the overall cohesiveness of the kingdom.

On 29 January 946, Eadgyth died suddenly at the age of 35, and Otto buried his wife in the Cathedral of Magdeburg. The union had lasted sixteen years and produced two children; with Eadgyth's death, Otto began to make arrangements for his succession. Like his father before him, Otto intended to transfer sole rule of the kingdom to his son Liudolf upon his death. Otto called together all leading figures of the kingdom and had them swear an oath of allegiance to Liudolf, thereby promising to recognize his sole claim to the throne as Otto's heir apparent.

Relying on recent archaeological evidences, Bachrach estimates that the armies he mobilized in 953 and 954 should have been in the range of 20,000 to 25,000 men, which were needed to besiege cities such as Mainz, which was defended by armies in excess of 30,000.

=== Foreign relations ===
==== France ====
The West Frankish kings had lost considerable royal power after internal struggles with their aristocracy, but still asserted their authority over the Duchy of Lorraine, a territory also claimed by East Francia. The German king was supported by Louis IV's chief domestic rival, Hugh the Great. Louis IV's second attempt to reign over Lorraine in 940 was based on his asserted claim to be the rightful Duke of Lorraine due to his marriage to Gerberga of Saxony, Otto's sister and the widow of Gilbert, Duke of Lorraine. Otto did not recognize Louis IV's claim and appointed his brother Henry as duke instead. In the following years, both sides tried to increase their influence in Lorraine, but the duchy remained a part of Otto's kingdom.

Despite their rivalry, Louis IV and Hugh were both tied to Otto's family through marriage bonds. Otto intervened for peace in 942 and announced a formal reconciliation between the two. As a part of the deal, Hugh was to perform an act of submission to Louis IV, and in return, Louis IV was to waive any claims to Lorraine. After a short period of peace, the West Frankish kingdom fell into another crisis in 946. Normans captured Louis IV and handed him over to Hugh, who released the King only on condition of the surrender of the fortress of Laon. At the urging of his sister Gerberga, Otto invaded France on behalf of Louis IV, but his armies were not strong enough to take the key cities of Laon, Reims, and Paris. After three months, Otto finally lifted the siege without defeating Hugh, but managed to depose Hugh of Vermandois from his position as Archbishop of Reims, restoring Artald of Reims to his former office.

To settle the issue of control over the Archdiocese of Reims, Otto called for a synod at Ingelheim on 7 June 948. The assembly was attended by more than 30 bishops, including all the archbishops of Germany – a demonstration of Otto's strong position in East and West Francia alike. The synod confirmed Otto's appointment of Artald as Archbishop of Reims, and Hugh was admonished to respect his king's royal authority. But it was not until 950 that the powerful vassal accepted Louis IV as king; the opponents were not fully reconciled until March 953.

Otto left the sorting out of West Frankish affairs to his son-in-law Conrad the Red and later Bruno the Great, together with Otto's sisters Gerberga and Hadwig who were regents for their sons King Lothar and Duke Hugh. Otto had received the feudal commendation of several west Frankish magnates, and like his father had settled royal and episcopal succession disputes in the western kingdom. Bruno intervened militarily in West Francia in 958, as well as against the Reginarids in Lotharingia. However, this Ottonian hegemony from 940 to 965 was personal rather than institutional, and quickly disappeared after the accession of Hugh Capet in 987.

==== Burgundy ====
Otto continued the peaceful relationship between Germany and the Kingdom of Burgundy initiated by his father. King Rudolf II of Burgundy had previously married Bertha of Swabia, the daughter of one of Henry's chief advisers, in 922. Burgundy was originally a part of Middle Francia, the central portion of Charlemagne's empire according to its division under the Treaty of Verdun in 843. On 11 July 937, Rudolf II died and Hugh of Provence, the King of Italy and Rudolf II's chief domestic opponent, claimed the Burgundian throne. Otto intervened in the succession and with his support, Rudolf II's son, Conrad of Burgundy, was able to secure the throne. Burgundy had become an integral, but formally independent, part of Otto's sphere of influence and remained at peace with Germany during his reign.

==== Bohemia ====
Boleslaus I, Duke of Bohemia, assumed the Bohemian throne in 935. The next year, following the death of Otto's father, King Henry the Fowler, Boleslaus stopped paying tribute to the German Kingdom (East Francia) in violation of the peace treaty Henry had established with Boleslaus' brother and predecessor, Wenceslaus I. Boleslaus attacked an ally of the Saxons in northwest Bohemia in 936 and defeated two of Otto's armies from Thuringia and Merseburg. After this initial large-scale invasion of Bohemia, hostilities were pursued, mainly in the form of border raids. The war was not concluded until 950, when Otto besieged a castle owned by Boleslaus' son. Boleslaus decided to sign a peace treaty, promising to resume payment of tribute. Boleslaus became Otto's ally, and his Bohemian force helped the German army against the common Magyar threat at the Lech river in 955. Later he went on to crush an uprising of two Slavic dukes (Stoigniew and Nako) in Mecklenburg, probably to ensure the spread of Bohemian estates to the east.

==== Byzantine Empire ====
During his early reign, Otto fostered close relations with Emperor Constantine VII Porphyrogenitus, who ruled over the Byzantine Empire from 913 until his death in 959; East Francia and Byzantium sent several ambassadors to one another. Bishop Thietmar of Merseburg, a medieval chronicler, records: "After this [Gilbert's defeat in 939], legates from the Greeks [Byzantines] twice brought gifts from their emperor to our king, both rulers being in a state of concord." It was during this time that Otto first tried to link himself to the Eastern Empire through marriage negotiations.

=== Slavic wars ===
As Otto was finalizing actions to suppress his brother's rebellion in 939, the Slavs on the Elbe River revolted against German rule. Having been subdued by Otto's father in 928, the Slavs saw Henry's rebellion as an opportunity to regain their independence. Otto's lieutenant in east Saxony, Count Gero of Merseburg, was charged with the subjugation of the pagan Polabian Slavs. According to Widukind, Gero invited about thirty Slavic chieftains to a banquet; after the feast his soldiers attacked and massacred the unsuspecting drunken guests. The Slavs demanded revenge and marched against Gero with an enormous army. Otto agreed to a brief truce with his rebellious brother Henry and moved to support Gero. After fierce fighting, their combined forces were able to repel the advancing Slavs; Otto then returned west to subdue his brother's rebellion.

In 941, Gero initiated another plot to subdue the Slavs. He recruited a captive Slav named Tugumir, a Hevelli chieftain, to his cause. Gero promised to support him in claiming the Hevellian throne, if Tugumir would later recognize Otto as his overlord. Tugumir agreed and returned to the Slavs. Due to Gero's massacre, few Slavic chieftains remained, and the Slavs quickly proclaimed Tugumir as their prince. Upon assuming the throne, Tugumir murdered his chief rival and proclaimed his loyalty to Otto, incorporating his territory into the German kingdom. Otto granted Tugumir the title of "duke" and allowed Tugumir to rule his people, subject to Otto's suzerainty, in the same manner as the German dukes. After the coup by Gero and Tugumir, the Slavic federation broke apart. In control of the key Hevelli stronghold of Brandenburg, Gero was able to attack and defeat the divided Slavic tribes. Otto and his successors extended their control into Eastern Europe through military colonization and the establishment of churches.

== Military expansion into Italy ==
=== Disputed Italian throne ===
Upon the death of Emperor Charles the Fat in 888, the empire of Charlemagne was divided into several territories: East Francia, West Francia, the kingdoms of Lower and Upper Burgundy, and the Kingdom of Italy, with each of the realms being ruled by its own king. Though the pope in Rome continued to invest the kings of Italy as "emperors" to rule Charlemagne's empire, these "Italian emperors" never exercised any authority north of the Alps. When Berengar I of Italy was assassinated in 924, the last nominal heir to Charlemagne was dead and the imperial title was left unclaimed.

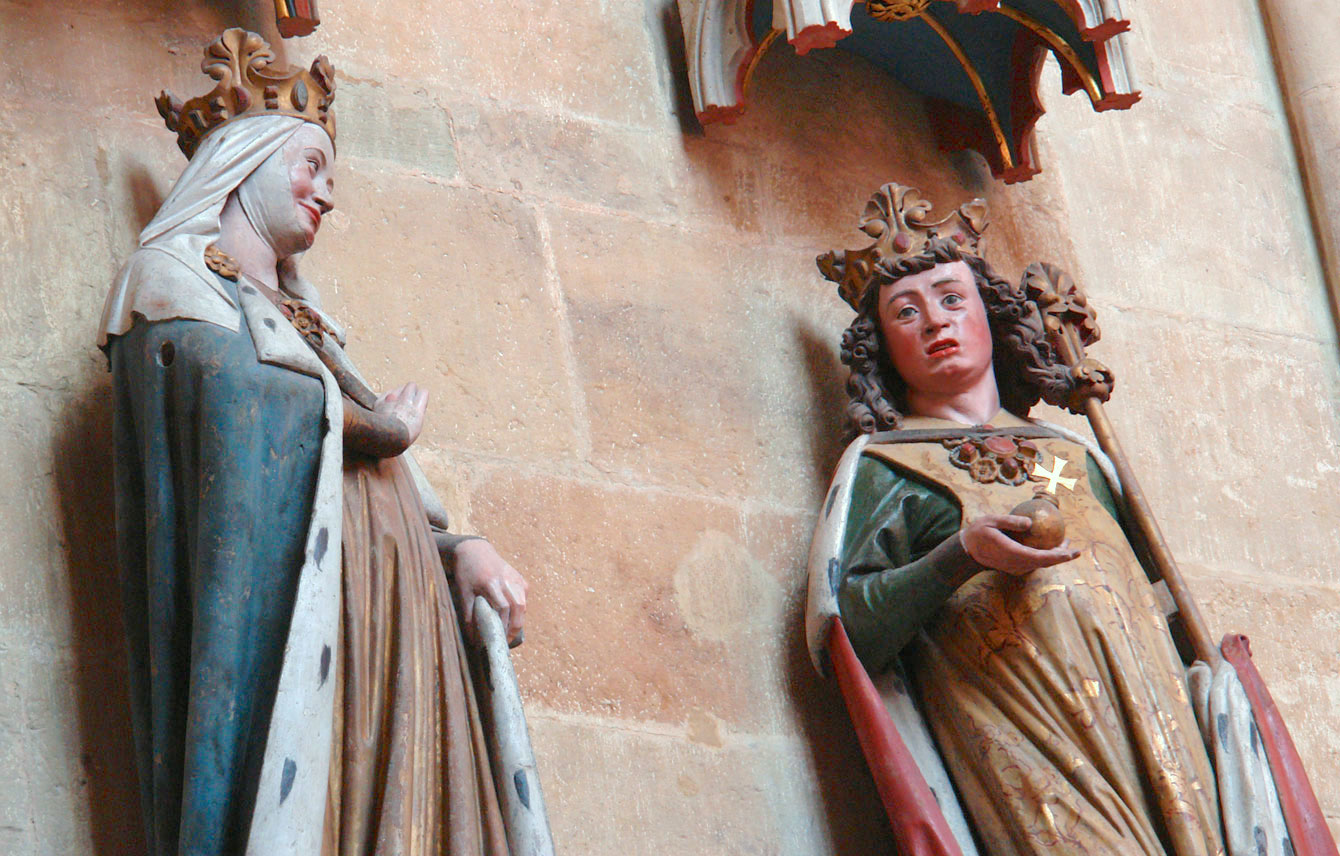
Statues of Otto I, right, and Adelaide in Meissen Cathedral. Otto and Adelaide were married after his annexation of Italy.

King Rudolf II of Upper Burgundy and Hugh, Count of Provence, the effective ruler of Lower Burgundy, competed with military means to gain dominion over Italy. In 926, Hugh's armies defeated Rudolf, Hugh could so establish de facto control over the Italian Peninsula and had himself crowned as King of Italy. His son Lothair was elevated to co-ruler in 931. Hugh and Rudolf II eventually concluded a peace treaty in 933; four years later Lothair was betrothed to Rudolf's infant daughter Adelaide.

In 940, Berengar II, Margrave of Ivrea, a grandson of former King Berengar I, led a revolt of Italian nobles against his uncle Hugh. Forewarned by Lothair, Hugh exiled Berengar II from Italy, and the margrave fled to the protection of Otto's court in 941. In 945, Berengar II returned and defeated Hugh with the support of the Italian nobility. Hugh abdicated in favor of his son and retired to Provence; Berengar II made terms with Lothair and established himself as the decisive power behind the throne. Lothair married the sixteen-year-old Adelaide in 947 and became nominal king when Hugh died on 10 April 948, but Berengar II continued to hold power as mayor of the palace or viceroy.

=== Strategic marriage to Adelaide, Queen of Italy ===
Lothair's brief "reign" came to an end with his death on 22 November 950, and Berengar II was crowned king on 15 December, with his son Adalbert of Italy as co-ruler. Failing to receive widespread support, Berengar II attempted to legitimize his reign and tried to force Adelaide, the respective daughter, daughter-in-law and widow of the last three Italian kings, into marriage with Adalbert. Adelaide fiercely refused and was imprisoned by Berengar II at Garda Lake. With the help of Count Adalbert Atto of Canossa, she managed to escape from imprisonment. Besieged by Berengar II in Canossa, Adelaide sent an emissary across the Alps seeking Otto's protection and marriage. A marriage to Adelaide would have strengthened the king's position to claim the Italian throne and ultimately the emperorship. Knowing of her great intelligence and immense wealth, Otto accepted Adelaide's marriage proposal and prepared for an expedition into Italy.

=== First Italian Military Expedition ===
In the early summer of 951, before his father marched across the Alps, Otto's son Liudolf, Duke of Swabia, invaded Lombardy in Northern Italy. (Note: From his stronghold in Swabia, located just north of the Alps, Liudolf was in closer proximity to the Italian border than his father in Saxony.) The exact reasons for Liudolf's action are unclear, and historians have proposed several possible motives. Liudolf may have tried to help Adelaide, a distant relative of Liudolf's wife Ida, or he intended to strengthen his position within the royal family. The young heir was also competing with his uncle, Duke Henry I of Bavaria, both in German affairs and Northern Italy. While Liudolf was preparing his expedition, Henry influenced the Italian aristocrats not to join Liudolf's campaign. When Liudolf arrived in Lombardy, he found no support and was unable to sustain his troops. His army was near destruction until Otto's troops crossed the Alps. The king reluctantly received Liudolf's forces into his command, angry at his son for his independent actions.

Otto and Liudolf's troops arrived in northern Italy in September 951 without opposition from Berengar II. As they descended into the Po River valley, the Italian nobles and clergy withdrew their support for Berengar and provided aid to Otto and his advancing army. Recognizing his weakened position, Berengar II fled from his capital in Pavia. When Otto arrived at Pavia on 23 September 951, the city willingly opened its gate to the German king, who was crowned king of the Lombards. Otto assumed the titles of Rex Italicorum and Rex Langobardorum in his acts from the 10 October onwards. Like Charlemagne before him, Otto was now concurrent King of Germany and King of Italy. Otto sent a message to his brother Henry in Bavaria to escort his bride from Canossa to Pavia, where the two married.

Soon after his father's marriage in Pavia, Liudolf left Italy and returned to Swabia. Archbishop Frederick of Mainz, the Primate of Germany and Otto's long-time domestic rival, also returned to Germany alongside Liudolf. Disturbances in northern Germany forced Otto to return with the majority of his army back across the Alps in 952. Otto did leave a small portion of his army behind in Italy and appointed his son-in-law Conrad, Duke of Lorraine, as his regent and tasked him with subduing Berengar II.

=== Aftermath: diplomacy and feudal agreement ===
In a weak military position with few troops, Otto's regent in Italy attempted a diplomatic solution and opened peace negotiations with Berengar II. Conrad recognized that a military confrontation would impose great costs upon Germany, both in manpower and in treasure. At a time when the kingdom was facing invasions from the north by the Danes and from the east by the Slavs and Hungarians, all available resources were required north of the Alps. Conrad believed that a client state relationship with Italy would be in Germany's best interest. He offered a peace treaty in which Berengar II would remain King of Italy on the condition that he recognized Otto as his overlord. Berengar II agreed and the pair traveled north to meet with Otto to seal the agreement.

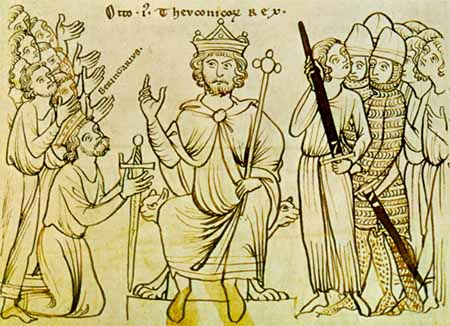
Manuscript depiction (c. 1200) of Otto accepting the surrender of Berengar II of Italy. The headline reads Otto I Theutonicorum rex ("Otto the First, King of the Germans").

Conrad's treaty was met with disdain by Adelaide and Henry. Though Adelaide was Burgundian by birth, she was raised as an Italian. Her father Rudolf II of Burgundy was briefly king of Italy prior to being deposed and she herself had briefly been queen of Italy until her husband Lothair II of Italy's death. Berengar II imprisoned her when she refused to marry his son, Adalbert of Italy. Henry had other reasons to disapprove of the peace treaty. As Duke of Bavaria, he controlled territory on the northern side of the German-Italian border. Henry had hope that, with Berengar II being deposed, his own fiefdom would be greatly expanded by incorporating territory south of the Alps. Conrad and Henry were already not on good terms, and the proposed treaty drove the two dukes further apart. Adelaide and Henry conspired together to persuade Otto to reject Conrad's treaty.

Conrad and Berengar II arrived at Magdeburg to meet Otto, but had to wait three days before an audience was granted. This was a humiliating offense for the man Otto had named his regent. Though Adelaide and Henry urged the treaty's immediate rejection, Otto referred the issue to an Imperial Diet for further debate. Appearing before the Diet in August 952 in Augsburg, Berengar II and his son Adalbert were forced to swear fealty to Otto as his vassals. In return, Otto granted Berengar II Italy as his fiefdom and restored the title "King of Italy" to him. The Italian king had to pay an enormous annual tribute and was required to cede the Duchy of Friuli south of the Alps. Otto reorganized this area into the March of Verona and put it under Henry's control as reward for his loyalty. The Duchy of Bavaria therefore grew to become the most powerful domain in Germany.

== Relations with the Catholic Church ==
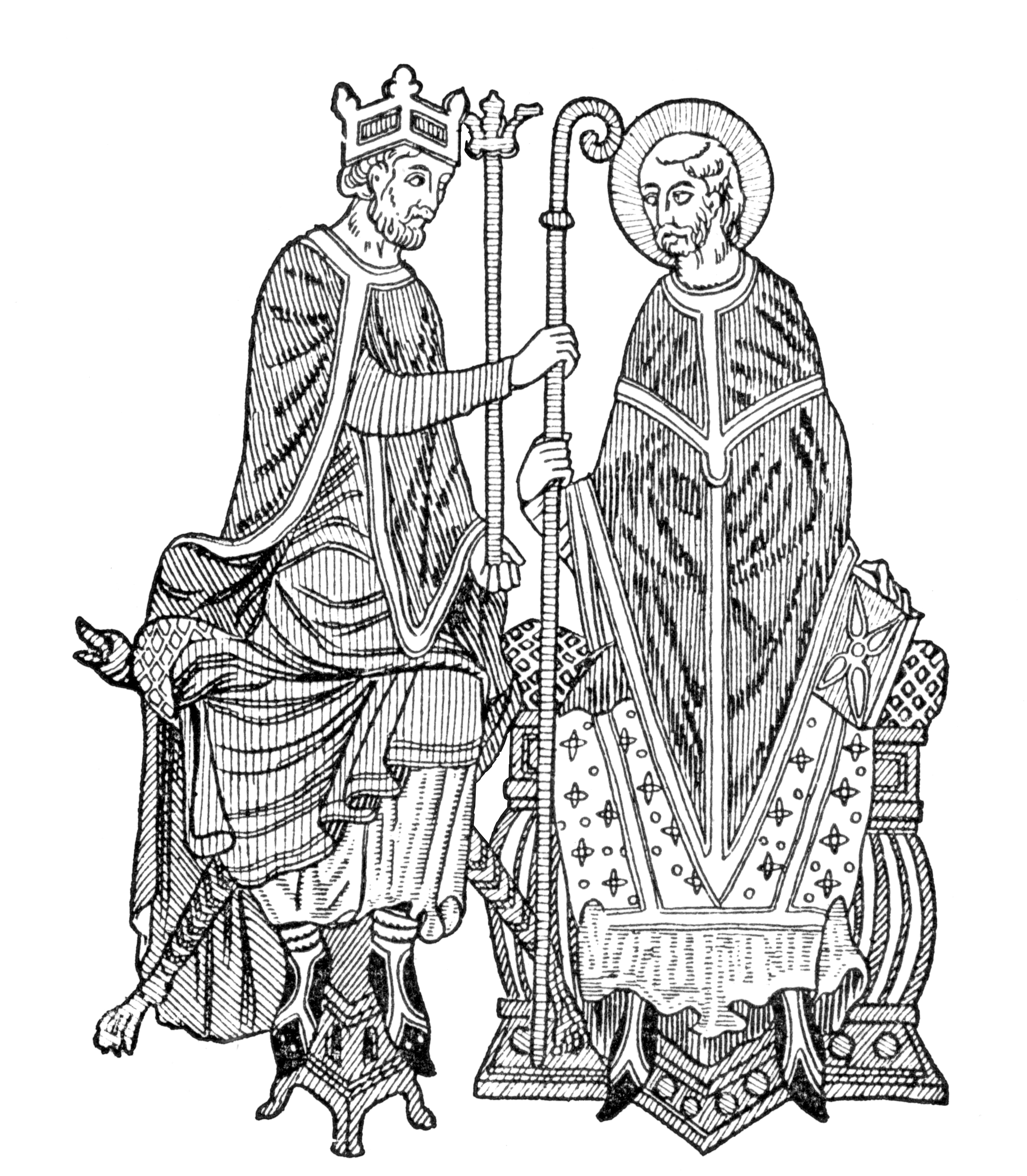
A medieval king investing a bishop with the symbols of office. Otto centralized his control over Germany through the investiture of bishops and abbots.

Beginning in the late 940s, Otto rearranged interior policies by utilizing the offices of the Catholic Church as tools of royal administration, thereby setting the course for the Ottonian imperial church system. With regard to his "divine right" to rule he viewed himself as the protector of the Church. A key element of administrative reorganisation was the installment of celibate clerics in secular offices, chiefly bishops and abbots, at the expense of the hereditary secular nobility. Otto sought to establish a non-hereditary counter-balance to the fiercely independent and powerful royal princes. He granted land and bestowed the title of Prince of the Empire (Reichsfürst) to appointed bishops and abbots. Hereditary claims were thus avoided as after death the offices fell back upon the crown. Historian Norman Cantor concludes: "Under these conditions clerical election became a mere formality in the Ottonian empire, and the king filled up the ranks of the episcopate with his own relatives and with his loyal chancery clerks, who were also appointed to head the great German monasteries."

The most prominent member of this blended royal-ecclesiastical service was his own brother Bruno the Great, Otto's Chancellor since 940, who was appointed Archbishop of Cologne and Duke of Lorraine in 953. Other important religious officials within Otto's government included Archbishop William of Mainz (Otto's illegitimate son), Archbishop Adaldag of Bremen, and Hadamar, the Abbot of Fulda. Otto endowed the bishoprics and abbeys of his kingdom with numerous gifts, including land and royal prerogatives, such as the power to levy taxes and to maintain an army. Over these Church lands, secular authorities had neither the power of taxation nor legal jurisdiction. This raised the Church above the various dukes and committed its clerics to serve as the king's personal vassals. In order to support the Church, Otto made tithing mandatory for all inhabitants of Germany.

Otto granted the various bishops and abbots of the kingdom the rank of count as well as the legal rights of counts within their territory. Because Otto personally appointed all bishops and abbots, these reforms strengthened his central authority, and the upper ranks of the German Church functioned in some respect as an arm of the royal bureaucracy. Otto routinely appointed his personal court chaplains to bishoprics throughout the kingdom. While attached to the royal court, the chaplains would perform the work of the government through services to the royal chancery. After years within the royal court, Otto would reward their service with promotion to a diocese.

== Liudolf's Civil War ==
=== Rebellion against Otto ===
With the humiliating failure of his Italian campaign and Otto's marriage to Adelaide, Liudolf became estranged from his father and planned a rebellion. On Christmas Day 951, he held a grand feast at Saalfeld that was attended by many important figures from across the kingdom, most notably Archbishop Frederick of Mainz, the Primate of Germany. Liudolf was able to recruit his brother-in-law Conrad, Duke of Lorraine, to his rebellion. As Otto's regent in Italy, Conrad had negotiated a peace agreement and an alliance with Berengar II and believed that Otto would confirm this treaty. Instead of an ally, Berengar II was made Otto's subject and his kingdom was subsequently reduced. Conrad felt betrayed and insulted over Otto's decision, especially with the additional empowerment of Henry. Conrad and Liudolf viewed Otto as being controlled by his foreign-born wife and power-hungry brother and resolved to free the kingdom from their domination.

In winter 952, Adelaide gave birth to a son, whom she named Henry after her brother-in-law and the child's grandfather, Henry the Fowler. Rumors spread that Otto had been persuaded by his wife and brother to propose this child as his heir instead of Liudolf. For many German nobles, this rumor represented Otto's final transformation from a policy focused on Germany to an Italian-centered one. The idea that Otto would ask them to revoke the succession rights of Liudolf prompted many nobles into open rebellion. Liudolf and Conrad first led the nobles against Henry, the Duke of Bavaria, in spring 953. Henry was unpopular with the Bavarians due to his Saxon heritage, and his vassals quickly rebelled against him.

Word of the rebellion reached Otto at Ingelheim. In order to secure his position, he traveled to his stronghold at Mainz. The city was also the seat of Archbishop Frederick of Mainz, who acted as mediator between Otto and the rebels. Recorded details of the meeting or the negotiated treaty do not exist, but Otto soon left Mainz with a peace treaty favorable to the conspirators, most likely confirming Liudolf as heir apparent and approving Conrad's original agreement with Berengar II. These terms rendered the treaty incompatible with the wishes of Adelaide and Henry.

When Otto returned to Saxony, Adelaide and Henry persuaded the king to void the treaty. Convening the Imperial Diet at Fritzlar, Otto declared Liudolf and Conrad as outlaws in absentia. The king reasserted his desires for dominion over Italy and to claim the imperial title. He sent emissaries to the Duchy of Lorraine and stirred the local nobles against Conrad's rule. The duke was a Salian Frank by birth and unpopular with the people of Lorraine, so they pledged their support to Otto.

Otto's actions at the Diet provoked the people of Swabia and Franconia into rebellion. After initial defeats by Otto, Liudolf and Conrad fell back to their headquarters in Mainz. In July 953, Otto and his army laid siege to the city, supported by Henry's army from Bavaria. After two months of siege, the city had not fallen and rebellions against Otto's rule grew stronger in southern Germany. Faced with these challenges, Otto opened peace negotiations with Liudolf and Conrad. Bruno the Great, Otto's youngest brother and royal chancellor since 940, accompanied his older brothers and oversaw the arrangements for the negotiations. As the newly appointed Archbishop of Cologne, Bruno was eager to end the civil war in Lorraine, which was in his ecclesiastical territory. The rebels demanded ratification of the treaty they had previously agreed to with Otto, but Henry's provocation during the meeting caused the negotiations to break down. Conrad and Liudolf left the meeting to continue the civil war. Angered by their actions, Otto stripped both men of their duchies of Swabia and Lorraine, and appointed his brother Bruno as the new Duke of Lorraine.

While on military campaign with Otto, Henry appointed the Bavarian Count Palatine, Arnulf II, to govern his duchy in his absence. Arnulf II was a son of Arnulf the Bad, whom Henry had previously displaced as duke, and he sought revenge: he deserted Henry and joined the rebellion against Otto. Lifting the siege of Mainz, Otto and Henry marched south to regain control over Bavaria. Without the support of the local nobles, their plan failed and they were forced to retreat to Saxony. The duchies of Bavaria, Swabia, and Franconia were in open civil war against the King, and even in his native Duchy of Saxony revolts began to spread. By the end of 953, the civil war was threatening to depose Otto and permanently end his claims to be Charlemagne's successor.

=== Forcing an end to the rebellion ===
In early 954, Margrave Hermann Billung, Otto's long-time loyal vassal in Saxony, was facing increased Slavic movements in the east. Taking advantage of the German civil war, the Slavs raided deeper and deeper into the adjacent border areas. Meanwhile, the Hungarians led by Bulcsú began extensive raids into Southern Germany. Though Liudolf and Conrad prepared defenses against the invasions in their territories, the Hungarians devastated Bavaria and Franconia. On Palm Sunday, 954, Liudolf held a great feast at Worms and invited the Hungarian chieftains to join him. There, he presented the invaders with gifts of gold and silver.

Otto's brother Henry soon spread rumors that Conrad and Liudolf had invited the Hungarians into Germany in hopes of using them against Otto. Public opinion quickly turned against the rebels in these duchies. With this change in opinion and the death of his wife Liutgarde, Otto's only daughter, Conrad began peace negotiations with Otto, which were eventually joined by Liudolf and Archbishop Frederick. A truce was declared, and Otto called a meeting of the Imperial Diet on 15 June 954 at Langenzenn. Before the assembly convened, Conrad and Frederick were reconciled with Otto. At the Diet, tensions flared up again when Henry accused his nephew Liudolf of conspiring with the Hungarians. Though Conrad and Frederick implored the enraged Liudolf to seek peace, Liudolf left the meeting determined to continue the civil war.

Liudolf, with his lieutenant Arnulf II (the effective ruler of Bavaria), took his army south towards Regensburg in Bavaria, quickly followed by Otto. The armies met at Nuremberg and engaged in a deadly, though not decisive, battle. Liudolf retreated to Regensburg, where he was besieged by Otto. Otto's army was unable to break through the city walls but caused starvation within the city after two months of siege. Liudolf sent a message to Otto seeking to open peace negotiations; the king demanded unconditional surrender, which Liudolf refused. After Arnulf II had been killed in continuous fighting, Liudolf fled from Bavaria for his domain of Swabia, quickly followed by Otto's army. The adversaries met at Illertissen near the Swabian-Bavarian border and opened negotiations. Liudolf and Otto called a truce until an Imperial Diet could be assembled to ratify the peace. The king forgave his son all transgressions and Liudolf agreed to accept any punishment his father felt appropriate.

Soon after this peace agreement, the aging and sick Archbishop Frederick died in October 954. With the surrender of Liudolf, the rebellion had been put down throughout Germany except in Bavaria. Otto convened the Imperial Diet in December 954 at Arnstadt. Before the assembled nobles of the kingdom, Liudolf and Conrad declared their fealty to Otto and yielded control over all the territories that their armies still occupied. Though Otto did not restore their former ducal titles to them, he did allow them to retain their private estates. The Diet ratified Otto's actions:

- Liudolf was promised regency over Italy and command of an army to depose Berengar II
- Conrad was promised military command against the Hungarians
- Burchard III, son of former Swabian Duke Burchard II, was appointed Duke of Swabia (Liudolf's former duchy)
- Bruno remained as new Duke of Lorraine (Conrad's former duchy)
- Henry was confirmed as Duke of Bavaria
- Otto's oldest son William was appointed Archbishop of Mainz and Primate of Germany
- Otto retained direct rule over the Duchy of Saxony and over the territories of the former Duchy of Franconia

The king's measures in December 954 finally brought an end to the two-year-long civil war. Liudolf's rebellion, though temporarily weakening Otto's position, ultimately strengthened it as absolute ruler of Germany.

== Hungarian military invasions ==
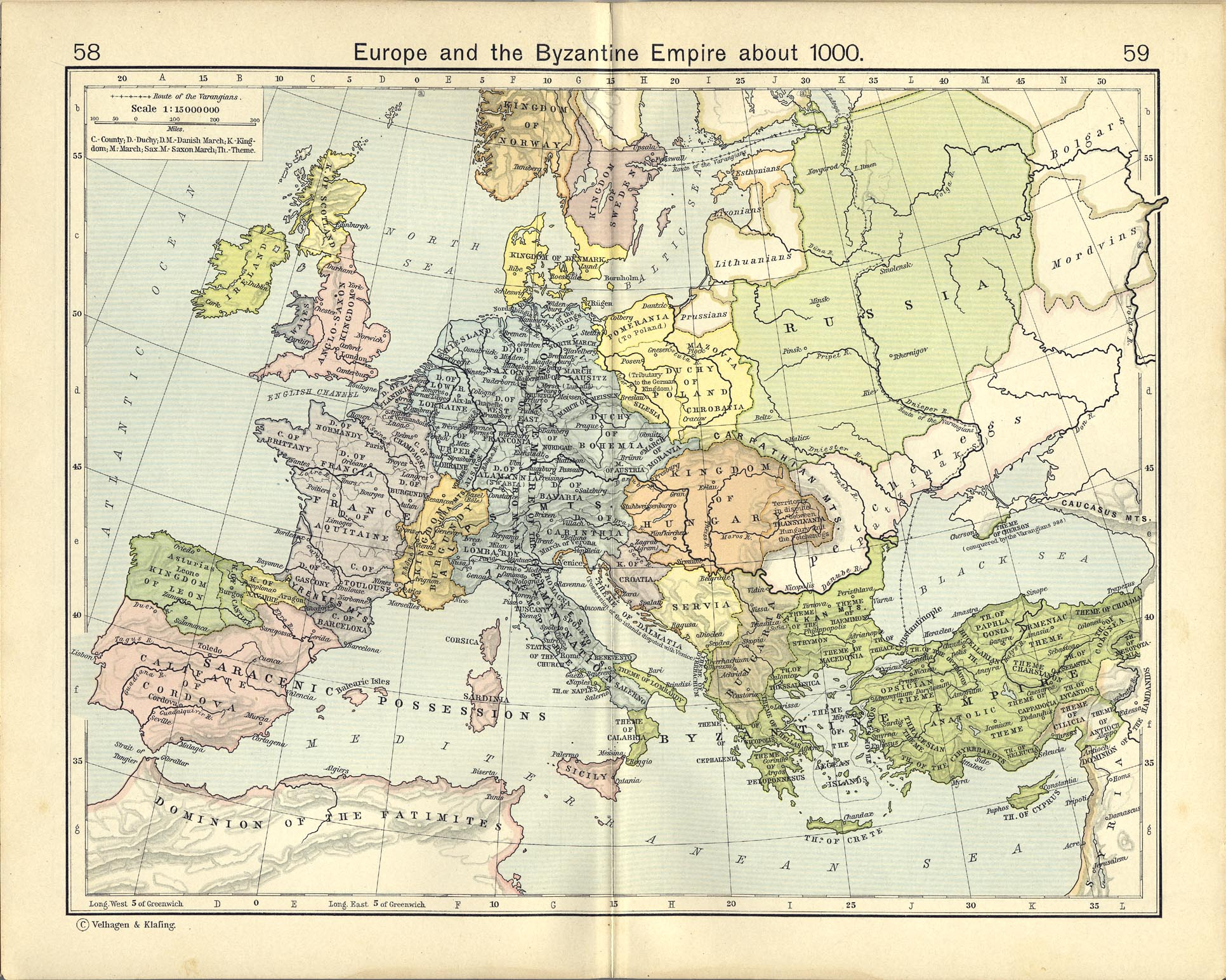
Europe shortly after Otto's reign. The Hungarians (orange), located to the east of Otto's realm (blue), invaded Germany in 954 and 955.

The Hungarians (Magyars) invaded Otto's domain as part of the larger Hungarian invasions of Europe and ravaged much of Southern Germany during Liudolf's civil war. Though Otto had installed the Margraves Hermann Billung and Gero on his kingdom's northern and northeastern borders, the Principality of Hungary to the southeast was a permanent threat to German security. The Hungarians took advantage of the kingdom's civil war and invaded the Duchy of Bavaria in spring 954. Though Liudolf, Duke of Swabia, and Conrad, Duke of Lorraine, had successfully prevented the Hungarians from invading their own territories in the west, the invaders managed to reach the Rhine River, sacking much of Bavaria and Franconia in the process.

The Hungarians, encouraged by their successful raids, began another invasion into Germany in the spring of 955. Otto's army, now unhindered by civil war, was able to defeat the invasion, and soon the Hungarians sent an ambassador to seek peace with Otto. The ambassador proved to be a decoy: Otto's brother Henry I, Duke of Bavaria, sent word to Otto that the Hungarians had crossed into his territory from the southeast. The main Hungarian army had camped along the Lech River and besieged Augsburg. While the city was defended by Bishop Ulrich of Augsburg, Otto assembled his army and marched south to face the Hungarians.

Otto and his army fought the Hungarian force on 10 August 955 at the Battle of Lechfeld. Under Otto's command were Burchard III, Duke of Swabia and Bohemian troops of Duke Boleslaus I. Though outnumbered nearly two to one, Otto was determined to push the Hungarian forces out of his territory. According to Widukind of Corvey, Otto "pitched his camp in the territory of the city of Augsburg and joined there the forces of Henry I, Duke of Bavaria, who was himself lying mortally ill nearby, and by Duke Conrad with a large following of Franconian knights. Conrad's unexpected arrival encouraged the warriors so much that they wished to attack the enemy immediately."

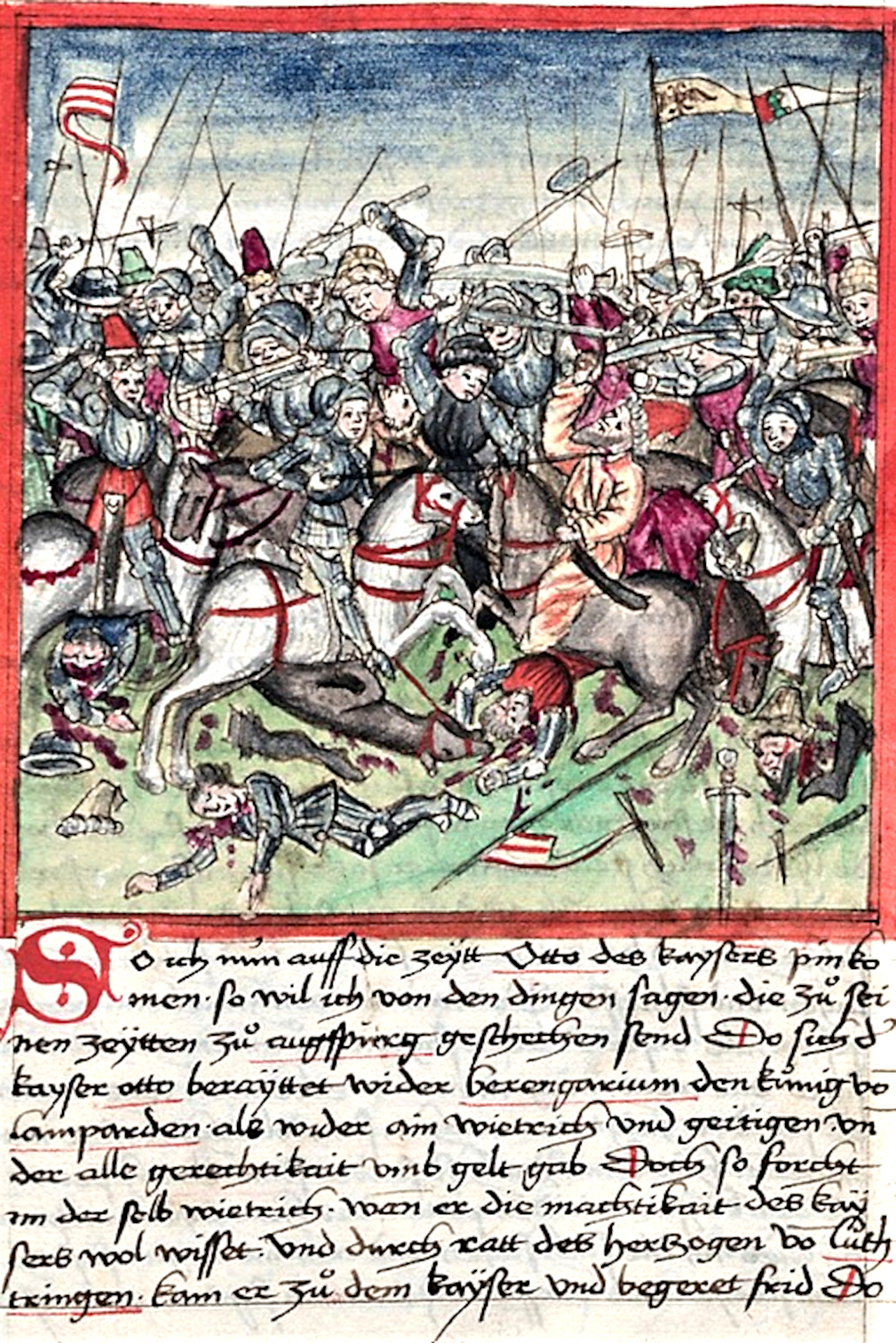
A 1457 illustration of the Battle of Lechfeld in Sigmund Meisterlin's codex about the history of Nuremberg

The Hungarians crossed the river and immediately attacked the Bohemians, followed by the Swabians under Burchard. Confusing the defenders with a rain of arrows, they plundered the baggage train and made many captives. As Otto received word of the attack, he ordered Conrad to relieve his rear units with a counter-attack. Upon the successful completion of his mission, Conrad returned to the main forces and the King launched an immediate assault. Despite a volley of arrows, Otto's army smashed into the Hungarian lines and was able to fight them in hand-to-hand combat, giving the traditionally nomadic warriors no room to use their preferred shoot-and-run tactics; the Hungarians suffered heavy losses and were forced to retreat in disorder. (Note: During the following days scattered parts of the Hungarian army were repeatedly attacked from nearby villages and castles; a second Bohemian force under Duke Boleslaus I was able to intercept and defeat them. The Hungarian leaders Lél, Bulcsú and Súr were executed in Regensburg.)

According to Widukind of Corvey, Otto was proclaimed Father of the Fatherland and Emperor at the following victory celebration. (Note: Widukind of Corvey, Res gestae saxonicae (in Latin) Book 3, chapter 49: "De triumpho regis. Triumpho celebri rex factus gloriosus ab exercitu pater patriae imperatorque appellatus est; ..." Bibliotheca Augustana.) While the battle was not a crushing defeat for the Hungarians, as Otto was not able to chase the fleeing army into Hungarian lands, the battle ended nearly 100 years of Hungarian invasions into Western Europe.

While Otto was fighting the Hungarians with his main army deployed in Southern Germany, the Obotrite Slavs in the north were in a state of insurrection. Count Wichmann the Younger, still Otto's opponent over the King's refusal to grant Wichmann the title of Margrave in 936, marauded through the lands of the Obotrites in the Billung March, causing the followers of Slavic Prince Nako to revolt. The Obotrites invaded Saxony in the fall of 955, killing the men of arms-bearing age and carrying off the women and children into slavery. In the aftermath of the Battle of Lechfeld, Otto rushed to the north and pressed far into their territory. A Slav embassy offered to pay annual tribute in return for being allowed self-government under German overlordship instead of direct German rule. Otto refused, and the two sides met on 16 October at the Battle of Recknitz. Otto's forces gained a decisive victory; after the battle, hundreds of captured Slavs were executed.

Celebrations for Otto's victory over the pagan Hungarians and Slavs were held in churches across the kingdom, with bishops attributing the victory to divine intervention and as proof of Otto's "divine right" to rule. The battles of Lechfeld and Recknitz mark a turning point in Otto's reign. The victories over Hungarians and Slavs sealed his hold on power over Germany, with the duchies firmly under royal authority. From 955 on, Otto would not experience another rebellion against his rule and as a result was able to further consolidate his position throughout Central Europe.

Otto's son-in-law, Conrad, the former Duke of Lorraine, was killed in the Battle of Lechfeld and the king's brother Henry I, Duke of Bavaria, was mortally wounded, dying a few months later on 1 November of that year. With Henry's death, Otto appointed his four-year-old nephew Henry II, to succeed his father as duke, with his mother Judith of Bavaria as his regent. Otto appointed Liudolf in 956 as the commander of an expedition against King Berengar II of Italy, but he soon died of fever on 6 September 957. Archbishop William buried his half-brother at St. Alban's Abbey near Mainz. The deaths of Henry, Liudolf, and Conrad took from Otto the three most prominent members of his royal family, including his heir apparent. Additionally, his first two sons from his marriage to Adelaide of Italy, Henry and Bruno, had both died in early childhood by 957. Otto's third son by Adelaide, the two-year-old Otto, became the kingdom's new heir apparent.

== Reign as emperor ==
=== Second Italian Military Expedition and imperial coronation ===
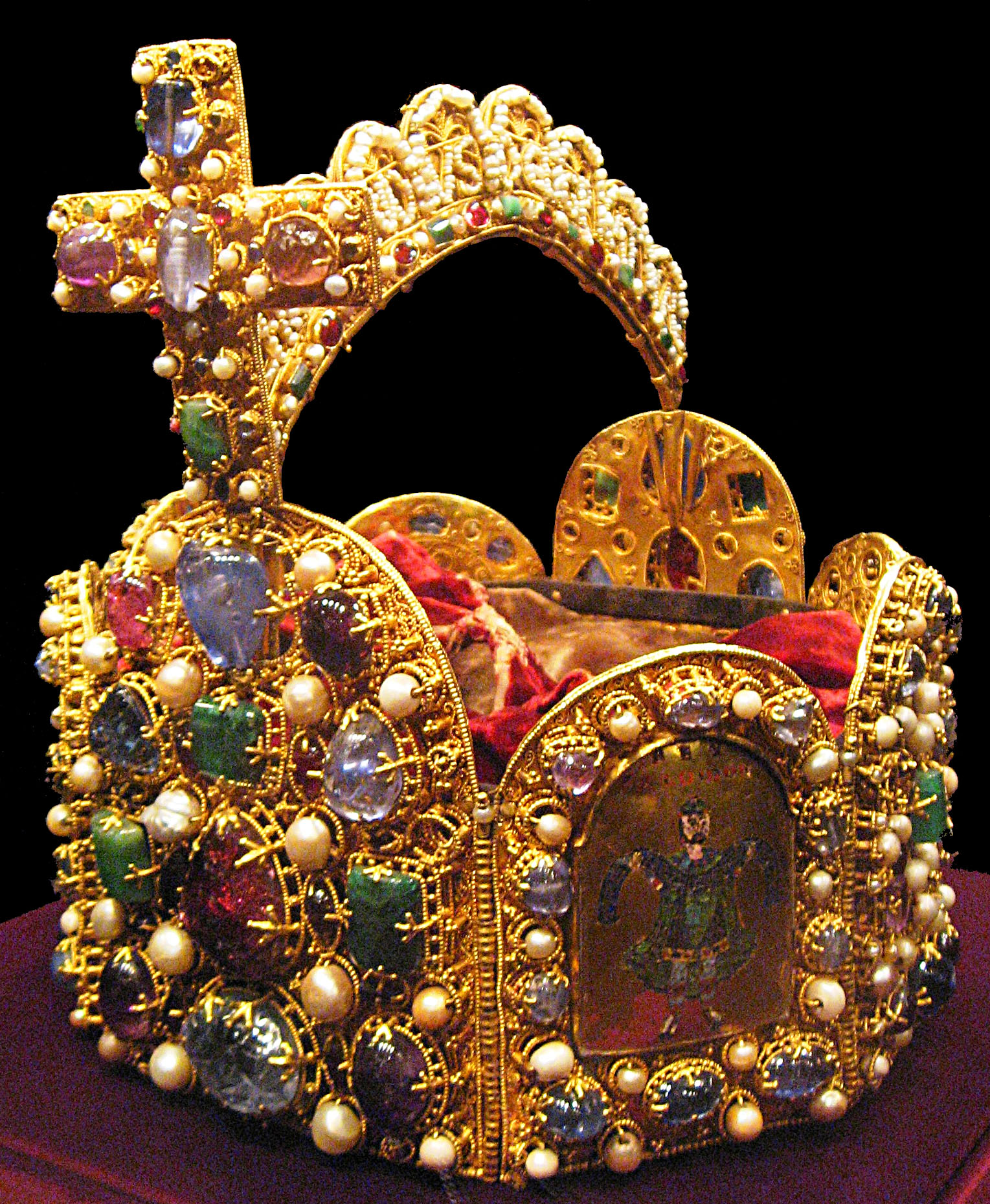
The Imperial Crown of the Holy Roman Empire. Otto was crowned as Emperor on 2 February 962 by Pope John XII.

Burgundian princess Adelaide, Queen of Italy whom the margrave Berengar of Ivrea had taken prisoner in 950, appealed to Otto for help. Otto marched into Italy in 951 and married Adelaide. In 952 Berengar signed a peace treaty in which he became Otto's vassal for the kingdom of Italy.

Liudolf's death in the fall of 957 deprived Otto of both an heir and a commander of his expedition against King Berengar II of Italy. Berengar II had always been a rebellious subordinate. With the death of Liudolf and Henry I, Duke of Bavaria, and with Otto campaigning in northern Germany, Berengar II attacked the March of Verona in 958, which Otto had stripped from his control under the 952 treaty, and besieged Count Adalbert Atto of Canossa there. Berengar II's forces also attacked the Papal States and the city of Rome under Pope John XII. In autumn 960, with Italy in political turmoil, the Pope sent word to Otto seeking his aid against Berengar II. Several other influential Italian leaders arrived at Otto's court with similar appeals, including the Archbishop of Milan, the bishops of Como and Novara, and Margrave Otbert of Milan.

After the Pope agreed to crown him as Emperor, Otto assembled his army to march upon Italy. In preparation for his second Italian campaign and the imperial coronation, Otto planned his kingdom's future. At the Imperial Diet at Worms in May 961, Otto named his six-year-old son Otto II as heir apparent and co-ruler, and had him crowned at Aachen Cathedral on 26 May 961. Otto II was anointed by the Archbishops Bruno I of Cologne, William of Mainz, and Henry I of Trier. The King instituted a separate chancery to issue diplomas in his heir's name, and appointed his brother Bruno and illegitimate son William as Otto II's co-regents in Germany.

Otto's army descended into northern Italy in August 961 through the Brenner Pass at Trento. The German king moved towards Pavia, the former Lombard capital of Italy, where he celebrated Christmas and assumed the title King of Italy for himself. Berengar II's armies retreated to their strongholds in order to avoid battle with Otto, allowing him to advance southward unopposed. Otto reached Rome on 31 January 962; three days later, he was crowned Emperor by Pope John XII at Old St. Peter's Basilica. The Pope also anointed Otto's wife Adelaide of Italy, who had accompanied Otto on his Italian campaign, as empress. With Otto's coronation as emperor, the Kingdom of Germany and the Kingdom of Italy were unified into a common realm, later called the Holy Roman Empire.

=== Papal politics ===
On 12 February 962, Emperor Otto I and Pope John XII called a synod in Rome to legalise their relationship. At the synod, Pope John XII approved Otto's long-desired Archdiocese of Magdeburg. The Emperor had planned the establishment of the archdiocese to commemorate his victory at the Battle of Lechfeld over the Hungarians and to further convert the local Slavs to Christianity. The Pope named the former royal monastery of St. Maurice as provisional center of the new archdiocese, and called upon the German archbishops for support.

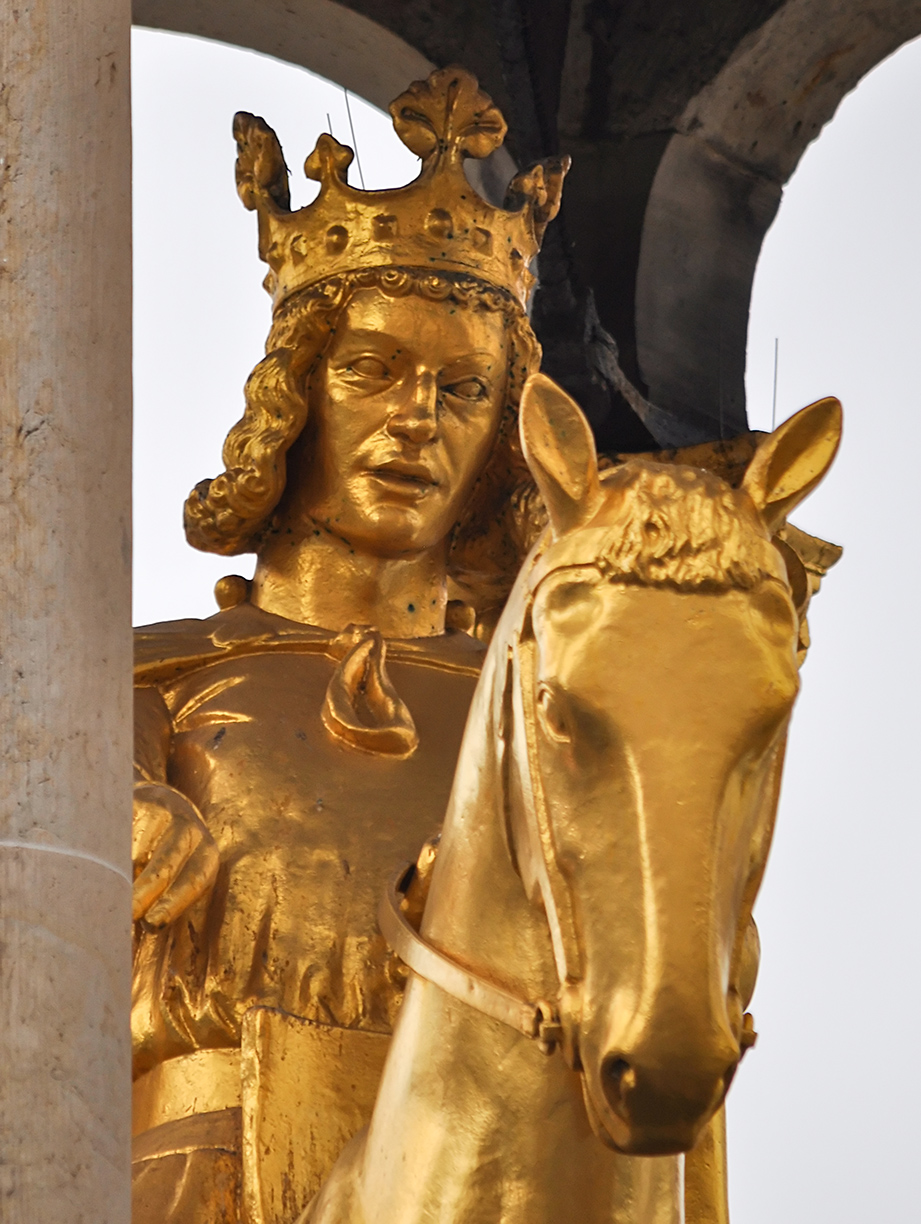
Replica of the Magdeburger Reiter, an equestrian monument traditionally regarded as a portrait of Otto I (Magdeburg, original c. 1240)

The following day, Otto and John XII ratified the Diploma Ottonianum, confirming John XII as the spiritual head of the Church and Otto as its secular protector. In the Diploma, Otto acknowledged the earlier Donation of Pepin of 754 between Pepin the Short, King of the Franks and Pope Stephen II. Otto recognized John XII's secular control over the Papal States, and expanded the Pope's domain by the Exarchate of Ravenna, the Duchy of Spoleto, the Duchy of Benevento and several smaller possessions. Otto however didn't have the obligation to deliver military aid in case the territories would be conquered by others and despite this confirmed claim, Otto never ceded real control over those additional territories. The Diploma granted the clergy and people of Rome the exclusive right to elect the pontiff. The pope-elect was required to issue an oath of allegiance to the emperor before his confirmation as pope an agreement based on feudal law with the consequence that the emperor had power over the pope and not vice versa.

With the Diploma signed, the new Emperor marched against Berengar II to reconquer Italy. Being besieged at San Leo, Berengar II surrendered in 963. Upon the successful completion of Otto's campaign, John XII began to fear the Emperor's rising power in Italy and opened negotiations with Berengar II's son, Adalbert of Italy to depose Otto. The Pope also sent envoys to the Hungarians and the Byzantine Empire to join him and Adalbert in an alliance against the Emperor. Otto discovered the Pope's plot and, after defeating and imprisoning Berengar II, marched on Rome. John XII fled from Rome, and Otto, upon his arrival in Rome, summoned a council and deposed John XII as Pope, appointing Leo VIII as his successor.

=== Otto fights Romans' decision to elect Pope Benedict V ===
Otto released most of his army to return to Germany by the end of 963, confident his rule in Italy and within Rome was secure. The Roman populace, however, considered Leo VIII, a layman with no former ecclesiastical training, unacceptable as Pope. In February 964, the Roman people forced Leo VIII to flee the city. In his absence, Leo VIII was deposed and John XII was restored to the chair of St. Peter. When John XII died suddenly in May 964, the Romans elected Pope Benedict V as his successor. Upon hearing of the Romans' actions, Otto mobilized new troops and marched on Rome. After laying siege to the city in June 964, Otto forced the Romans to accept his appointee Leo VIII as Pope and exiled Benedict V.

=== Third Italian Military Expedition ===
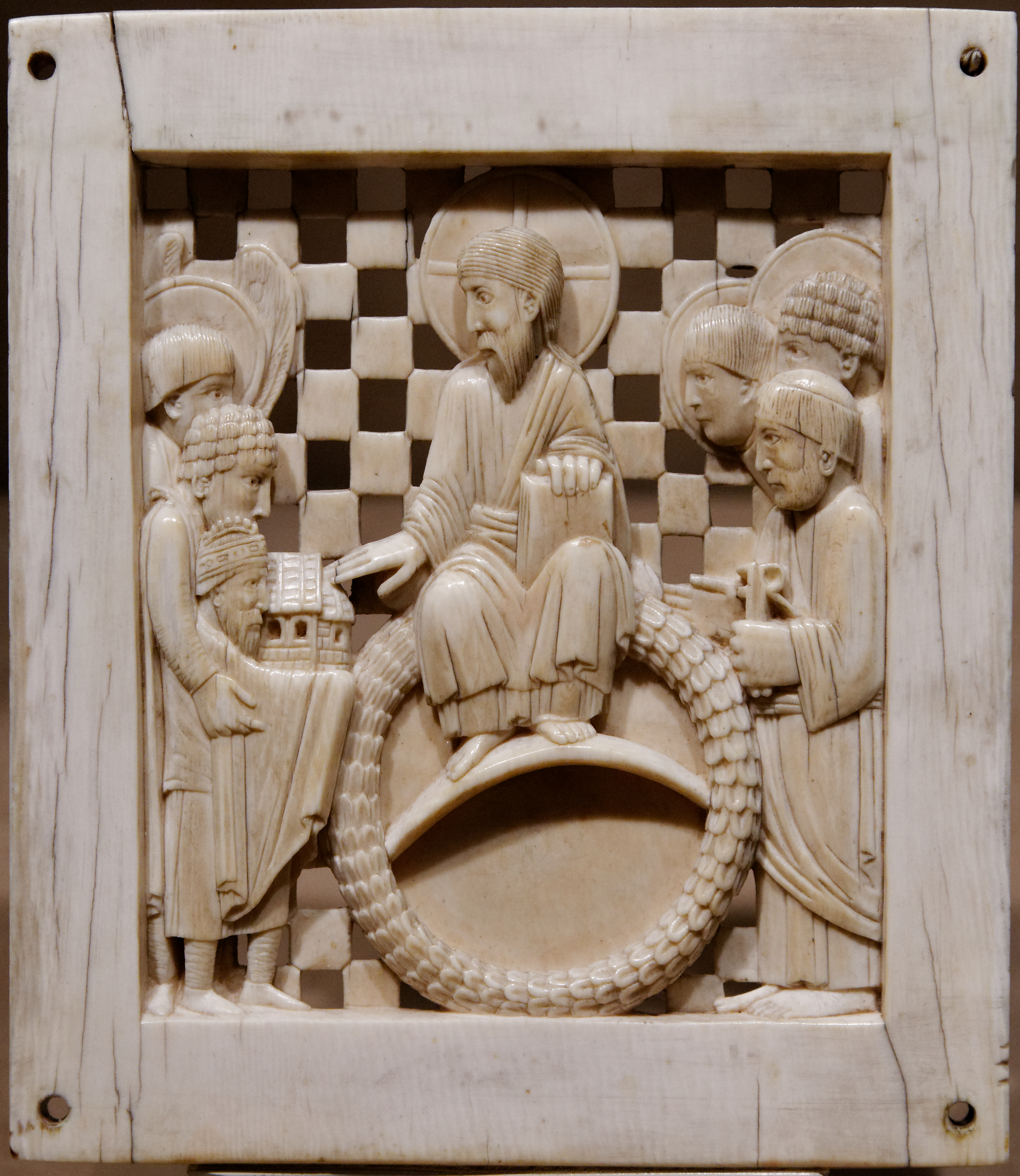
Contemporary image of Otto I, lower left, in one of the Magdeburg Ivories. Otto presents Magdeburg Cathedral to Christ and Saints, and is depicted smaller than them as a sign of humility.

Otto returned to Germany in January 965, believing his affairs in Italy had been settled. On 20 May 965, the Emperor's long-serving lieutenant on the eastern front, Margrave Gero, died and left a vast march stretching from the Billung March in the north to the Duchy of Bohemia in the south. Otto divided this territory into five separate smaller marches, each ruled by a margrave: the Northern March under Dietrich of Haldensleben, the Eastern March under Odo I, the March of Meissen under Wigbert, the March of Merseburg under Günther, and the March of Zeitz under Wigger I.

Peace in Italy, however, would not last long. Adalbert, the son of the deposed King Berengar II of Italy, rebelled against Otto's rule over the Kingdom of Italy. Otto dispatched Burchard III of Swabia, one of his closest advisors, to crush the rebellion. Burchard III met Adalbert at the Battle of the Po on 25 June 965, defeating the rebels and restoring Italy to Ottonian control. Pope Leo VIII died on 1 March 965, leaving the chair of St. Peter vacant. The Church elected, with Otto's approval, John XIII as new Pope in October 965. John XIII's arrogant behavior and foreign backing soon made him disliked among the local population. In December of the same year, he was taken into custody by the Roman people but was able to escape a few weeks later. Following the Pope's request for help, the Emperor prepared his army for a third expedition into Italy.

In August 966 at Worms, Otto announced his arrangements for the government of Germany in his absence. Otto's illegitimate son Archbishop William of Mainz would serve as his regent over all of Germany, while Otto's trusted lieutenant, Margrave Hermann Billung, would be his personal administrator over the Duchy of Saxony. With preparations completed, Otto left his heir in William's custody and led his army into northern Italy via Strasbourg and Chur.

=== Reign from Rome ===
Italy around 1000, shortly after Otto's reign. Otto's expansion campaigns brought northern and central Italy into the Holy Roman Empire.

Upon Otto's arrival in Italy, John XIII was restored to his papal throne in mid-November 966 without opposition by the people. Otto captured the twelve leaders of the rebel militia, which had deposed and imprisoned the Pope, and had them hanged. Taking up permanent residence at Rome, the Emperor travelled, accompanied by the Pope, to Ravenna to celebrate Easter in 967. A following synod confirmed Magdeburg's disputed status as a new archdiocese with equal rights to the established German archdioceses.

With his matters arranged in northern Italy, the Emperor continued to expand his realm to the south. Since February 967, the Prince of Benevento, Lombard Pandolf Ironhead, had accepted Otto as his overlord and received Spoleto and Camerino as fiefdom. This decision caused conflict with the Byzantine Empire, which claimed sovereignty over the principalities of southern Italy. The eastern Empire also objected to Otto's use of the title Emperor, believing only the Byzantine Emperor Nikephoros II Phokas was the true successor of the ancient Roman Empire.

The Byzantines opened peace talks with Otto, despite his expansive policy in their sphere of influence. Otto desired both an imperial princess as a bride for his son and successor Otto II as well as the legitimacy and prestige of a connection between the Ottonian dynasty in the West and the Macedonian dynasty in the East. In order to further his dynastic plans, and in preparation for his son's marriage, Otto returned to Rome in the winter of 967 where he had Otto II crowned co-Emperor by Pope John XIII on Christmas Day 967. Although Otto II was now nominal co-ruler, he exercised no real authority until the death of his father.

In the following years, both empires sought to strengthen their influence in southern Italy with several campaigns. In 969, John I Tzimiskes assassinated and succeeded Byzantine Emperor Nikephoros in a military revolt. Finally recognizing Otto's imperial title, the new eastern emperor sent his niece Theophanu to Rome in 972, and she married Otto II on 14 April 972. As part of this rapprochement, the conflict over southern Italy was finally resolved: the Byzantine Empire accepted Otto's dominion over the principalities of Capua, Benevento and Salerno; in return the German Emperor retreated from the Byzantine possessions in Apulia and Calabria.

== Culture ==
Otto patronised the arts and learning, helping establish several cathedral schools that evolved into vibrant cultural centres. The first female writer from the Germanosphere, the first female historian, the first person since the Fall of the Western Roman Empire to write dramas in the Latin West, and the first German female poet – Hrotsvitha – was raised in his court, where she grew up hearing the works of classical authors. As an adult, she became well-versed in the legal system, the history of the Ottonian dynasty, and their line of succession. Hrotsvitha was the first Northern European to write about Islam and the Islamic empire. When she entered a royal convent, she wrote plays that incorporated Roman comedy with the tales of early Christian martyrs.

== Final years and death ==
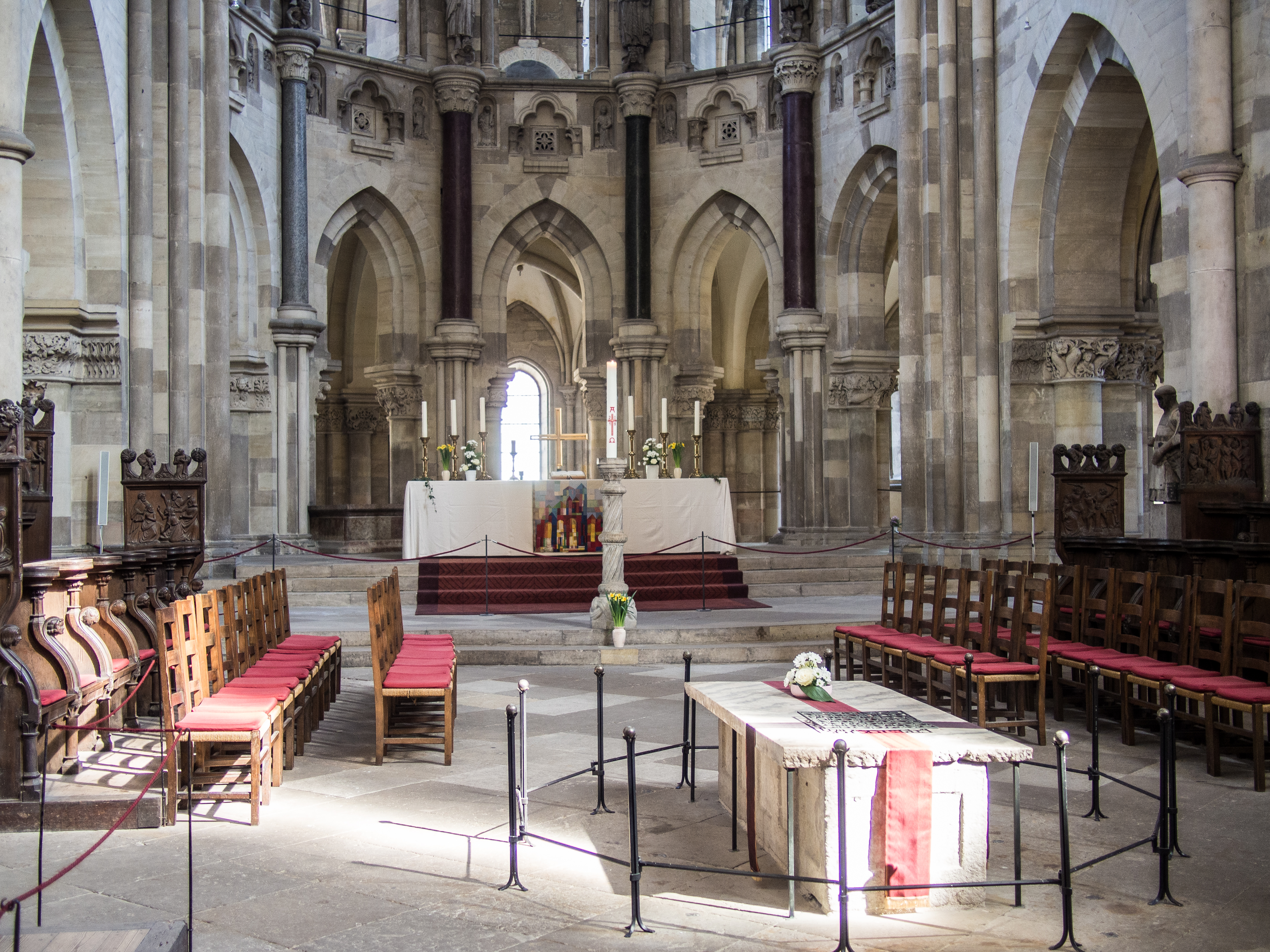
Tomb of Otto I in Magdeburg Cathedral

With his son's wedding completed and peace with the Byzantine Empire concluded, Otto led the imperial family back to Germany in August 972. In the spring of 973, the Emperor visited Saxony and celebrated Palm Sunday in Magdeburg. At the same ceremony the previous year, Margrave Hermann Billung, Otto's trusted lieutenant and personal administrator over Saxony during his years in Italy, had been received like a king by Archbishop Adalbert of Magdeburg – a gesture of protest against the Emperor's prolonged absence from Germany.

Celebrating Easter with a great assembly in Quedlinburg, Emperor Otto was the most powerful man in Europe. According to Thietmar of Merseburg, Otto received "the dukes Miesco [of Poland] and Boleslav [of Bohemia], and legates from the Greeks [Byzantium], the Beneventans [Rome], Magyars, Bulgars, Danes and Slavs". Ambassadors from England and Al-Andalus arrived later the same year. To mark the Rogation Days, Otto travelled to his palace at Memleben, the place where his father had died 37 years earlier. While there, Otto became seriously ill with fever and, after receiving his last sacraments, died on 7 May 973 at the age of 60.

The transition of power to his seventeen-year-old son Otto II was seamless. On 8 May 973, the lords of the Empire confirmed Otto II as their new ruler. Otto II arranged for a magnificent thirty-day funeral, in which his father was buried beside his first wife Eadgyth in Magdeburg Cathedral.

== Family and children ==
Although never emperor, Otto's father Henry I the Fowler is considered the founder of the Ottonian dynasty. In relation to the other members of his dynasty, Otto I was the son of Henry I, father of Otto II, grandfather of Otto III, and great-uncle to Henry II. The Ottonians would rule Germany (later the Holy Roman Empire) for over a century from 919 until 1024.

Otto had two wives and at least seven children, one of which was illegitimate.

- With an unidentified Slavic woman:
1. William (929 – 2 March 968) – Archbishop of Mainz from 17 December 954 until death
- With Eadgyth of England, daughter of King Edward the Elder:
1. Liudolf (930 – 6 September 957) – Duke of Swabia from 950 to 954, Otto's expected successor from 947 until death
2. Liutgarde (932–953) – married Conrad, Duke of Lorraine, in 947
- With Adelaide of Italy, daughter of King Rudolf II of Burgundy:
1. Henry (952–954)
2. Bruno (probably 954–957)
3. Matilda (954–999) – Abbess of Quedlinburg from 966 until death
4. Otto II (955 – 7 December 983) – Holy Roman Emperor from 973 until death

== Legacy ==
=== Ottonian Renaissance ===
Imperial Crown of the Holy Roman Empire commemorative coin

A limited renaissance of the arts and architecture in the second half of the 10th century depended on the court patronage of Otto and his immediate successors. The Ottonian Renaissance was manifest in some revived cathedral schools, such as that of Bruno I, Archbishop of Cologne, and in the production of illuminated manuscripts, the major art form of the age, from a handful of elite scriptoria, such as that at Quedlinburg Abbey, founded by Otto in 936. Extant manuscripts of this era are the Diploma Ottonianum, the Marriage Charter of Empress Theophanu, and the Gero Codex, an evangeliary drawn up around 969 for Archbishop Gero. The Imperial abbeys and the Imperial courts became centers of religious and spiritual life; prestigious convents like Gandersheim and Quedlinburg were led by women of the royal family.

=== Modern world ===
Otto I was selected as the main motif for a high value commemorative coin, the €100 Imperial Crown of the Holy Roman Empire commemorative coin, issued in 2008 by the Austrian Mint. The obverse shows the Imperial Crown of the Holy Roman Empire. The reverse shows Emperor Otto I with Old St. Peter's Basilica in Rome in the background, where his coronation took place. Among others, three exhibitions in Magdeburg, opening in 2001, 2006 and 2012, have documented Otto's life and his influence on medieval European history. In 2025, Otto's tomb in Magdeburg was opened for investigative work and conservation. In mid-June 2025, the inner coffin's cover plate was removed "in order to secure and preserve the bones, textiles, and other materials contained within". The identity of the bones found in the coffin was announced in a public presentation in March 2026 to almost certainly be that of Otto I, as conservation work on the sarcophagus continued.

== Ancestry ==
Ancestors of Otto I, Holy Roman Emperor

8. Liudolf, Duke of Saxony
4. Otto I, Duke of Saxony
9. Oda Billung
2. Henry I of Germany
10. probably Henry of Franconia
5. Hedwiga
11. unknown
1. Otto I, Holy Roman Emperor
12. unknown
6. Dietrich, count in Westphalia
13. Matilda, Abbess of Herford
3. Matilda
14. unknown
7. Reinhild
15. unknown

== Bibliography ==
- Althoff, Gerd (2013). Die Ottonen: Königsherrschaft ohne Staat (in German) (3rd ed.). Kohlhammer Verlag. ISBN 978-3-17-022443-8.
- Arnold, Benjamin (1997). Medieval Germany, 500–1300 A Political Interpretation. Palgrave Macmillan. ISBN 978-0-333-61091-6.
- Barraclough, Geoffrey (1946). The Origins of Modern Germany. Basil Blackwell.
- Becher, Matthias (2012). Otto der Große (in German). C.H.Beck. ISBN 978-3-406-63061-3.
- Bernhardt, John W. (1993). Itinerant Kingship and Royal Monasteries in Early Medieval Germany, c. 936–1075. Cambridge University Press. ISBN 978-0-521-52183-3.
- Beumann, Helmut (2000). Die Ottonen (in German) (5th ed.). Kohlhammer Verlag. ISBN 978-3-17-016473-4.
- Cantor, Norman F. (1994). The Civilization of the Middle Ages. Harper Perennial. ISBN 978-0-06-092553-6.
- Collins, Roger (2010). Early Medieval Europe 300–1000 (3rd ed.). Palgrave Macmillan. ISBN 978-0-230-00673-7.
- Duckett, Eleanor Shipley (1968). Death and Life in the Tenth Century. University of Michigan Press. ISBN 978-0-472-06172-3.
- Gwatkin, H. M.; Whitney, J. P.; Tanner, J. R.; Previté-Orton, C. W., eds. (1922). The Cambridge Medieval History: Volume III. Cambridge University Press. ISBN 978-0-521-04534-6.
- Heather, Peter (2014). The Restoration of Rome: Barbarian Popes and Imperial Pretenders. Oxford University Press. ISBN 978-0-19-936852-5.
- Holböck, Ferdinand (2002). Married Saints and Blesseds: Through the Centuries. Ignatius Press.
- Keller, Hagen (2008). Die Ottonen (in German) (4th ed.). C.H.Beck. ISBN 978-3-406-44746-4.
- Keller, Hagen; Althoff, Gerd (2008). Die Zeit der späten Karolinger und der Ottonen: 888–1024. Gebhardt Handbuch der deutschen Geschichte Band 3 (in German). Klett-Cotta. ISBN 978-3-608-60003-2.
- McBrien, Richard P. (2000). Lives of the Popes: The Pontiffs from St. Peter to Benedict XVI. HarperCollins. ISBN 978-0-06-087807-8.
- Poole, Reginald L. (April 1911). "Burgundian Notes". The English Historical Review. 26 (102): 310–317. doi:10.1093/ehr/xxvi.cii.310.
- Reuter, Timothy (1991). Germany in the Early Middle Ages 800–1056. Addison Wesley Longman. ISBN 978-0-582-49034-5.
- Schutz, Herbert (2010). The Medieval Empire in Central Europe: Dynastic Continuity in the Post-Carolingian Frankish Realm, 900–1300. Cambridge Scholars Publishing. pp. 41–70. ISBN 978-1-4438-1966-4.
- Thompson, James Westfall (1928). Feudal Germany (2 vols.). University of Chicago Press.
- Zimmermann, Wilhelm (2010) [1st. pub. 1877]. A Popular History of Germany: From the Earliest Period to the Present Day, Volume II. Henry J. Johnson. ISBN 978-1-145-40896-8.

=== Primary sources ===
- Arnulf of Milan (1072–1077). "Liber gestorum recentium" (PDF). In Zey, Claudia (ed.). Monumenta Germaniae Historica (MGH). Scriptores rerum Germanicarum in usum scholarum separatim editi. Vol. 67 (1994). Translated by W. North. Hahnsche Buchhandlung. ISBN 978-3-7752-5388-8.
- Thietmar of Merseburg (1012–1018). "Chronicon Thietmari Merseburgensis". In Warner, David A. (ed.). Ottonian Germany. The Chronicon of Thietmar of Merseburg (2001). Translated by David A. Warner. Manchester University Press. ISBN 978-0-7190-4926-2.
- Vita Mathildis reginae posterior (c. 1003, written for Matilda's great-grandson Henry II), ed. Bernd Schütte. Die Lebensbeschreibungen der Königin Mathilde. MGH SS rer. Germ. in usum scholarum 66. Hannover, 1994. 143–202. Edition by Georg Heinrich Pertz. MGH SS 4: 282–302; tr. in Sean Gilsdorf, Queenship and Sanctity, 88–127. Digital MGH archive.

Otto the Great House of Otto Born: 23 November 912 Died: 7 May 973
Regnal titles
Vacant Title last held by Berengar I	Holy Roman Emperor; 962–973 with Otto II (967–973)	Succeeded by Otto II
Preceded by Berengar II	King of Italy; 961–973	Succeeded by Otto II
Preceded by Henry I	King of East Francia/Germany; 936–973 with Otto II (961–973)	Succeeded by Otto II
Preceded by Henry I	Duke of Saxony; 936–973	Succeeded by Bernard I
