= Brianza =

Historical and cultural area of Italy

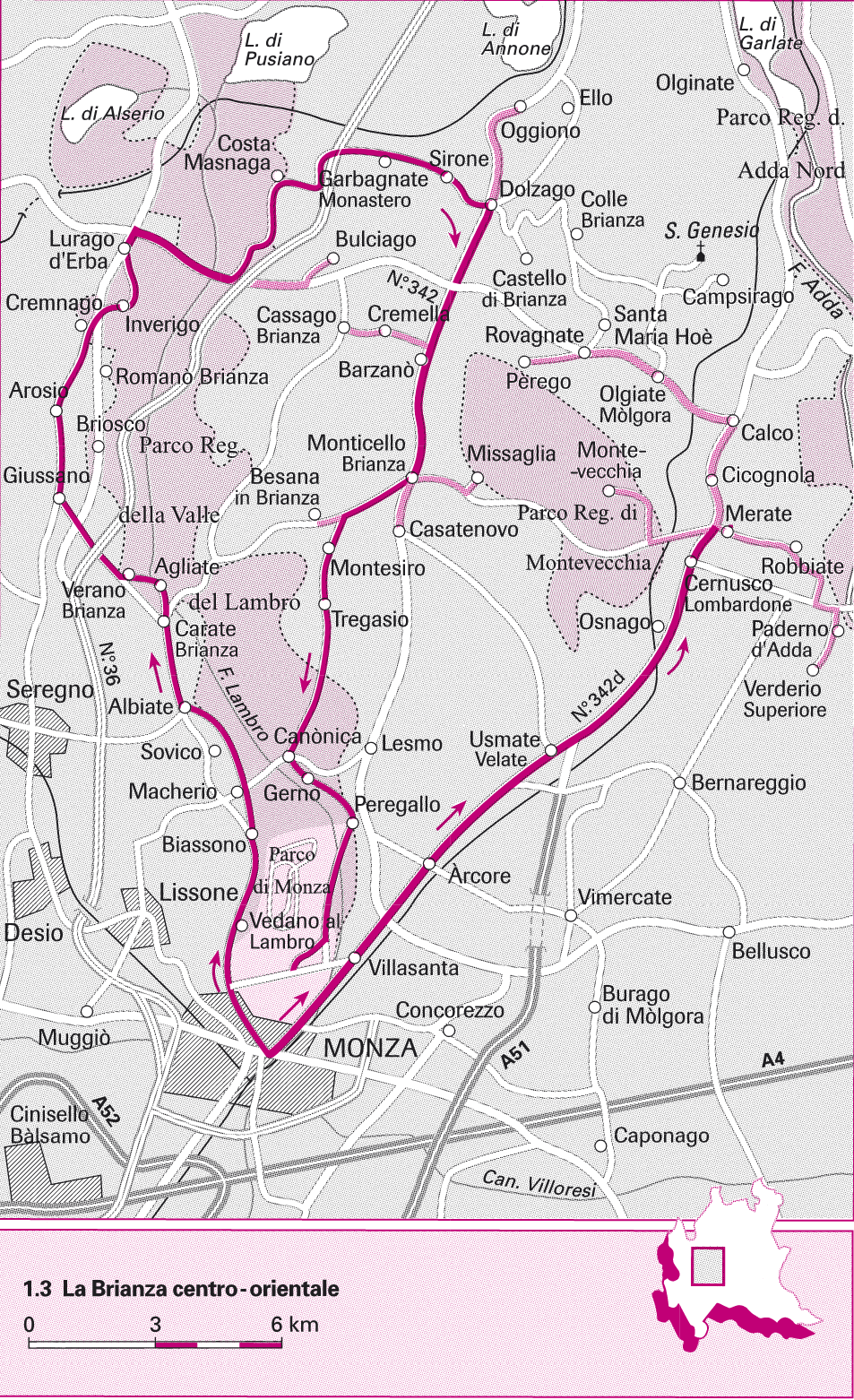
Map of eastern Brianza

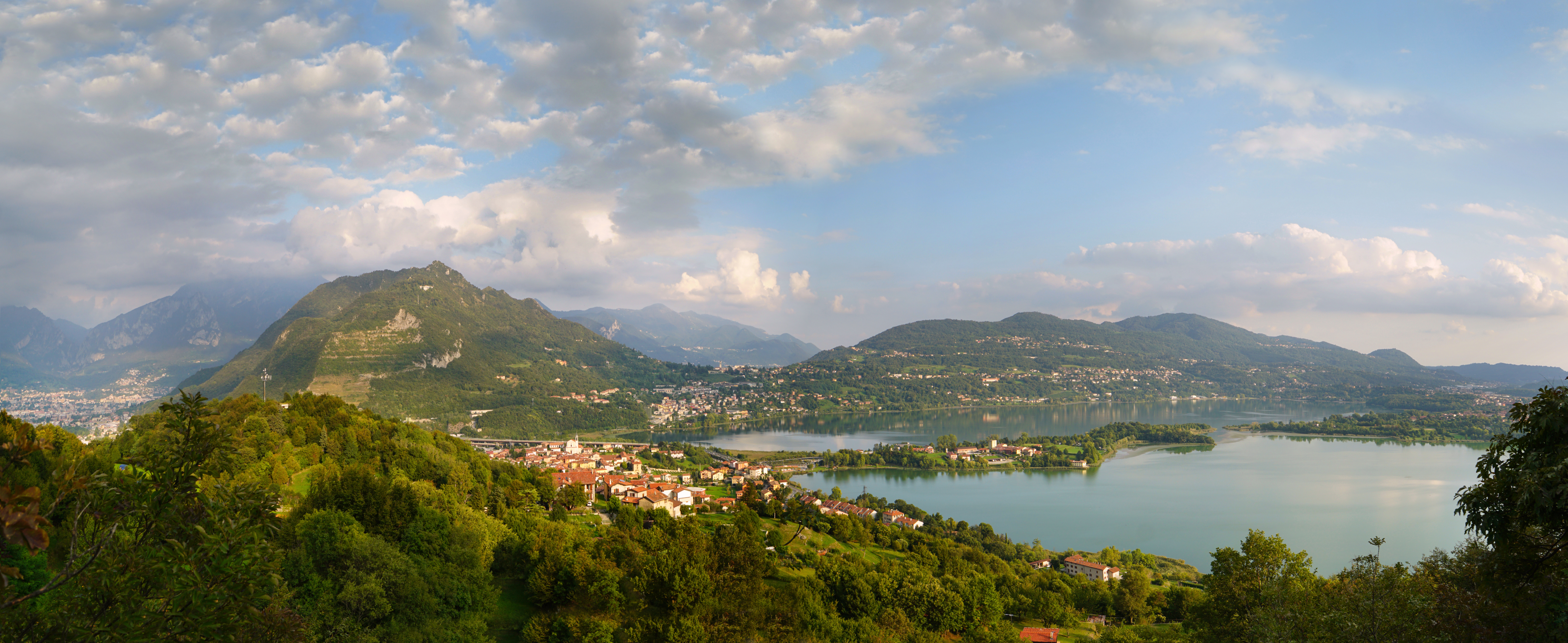
The Annone Lake and the Mount Barro.

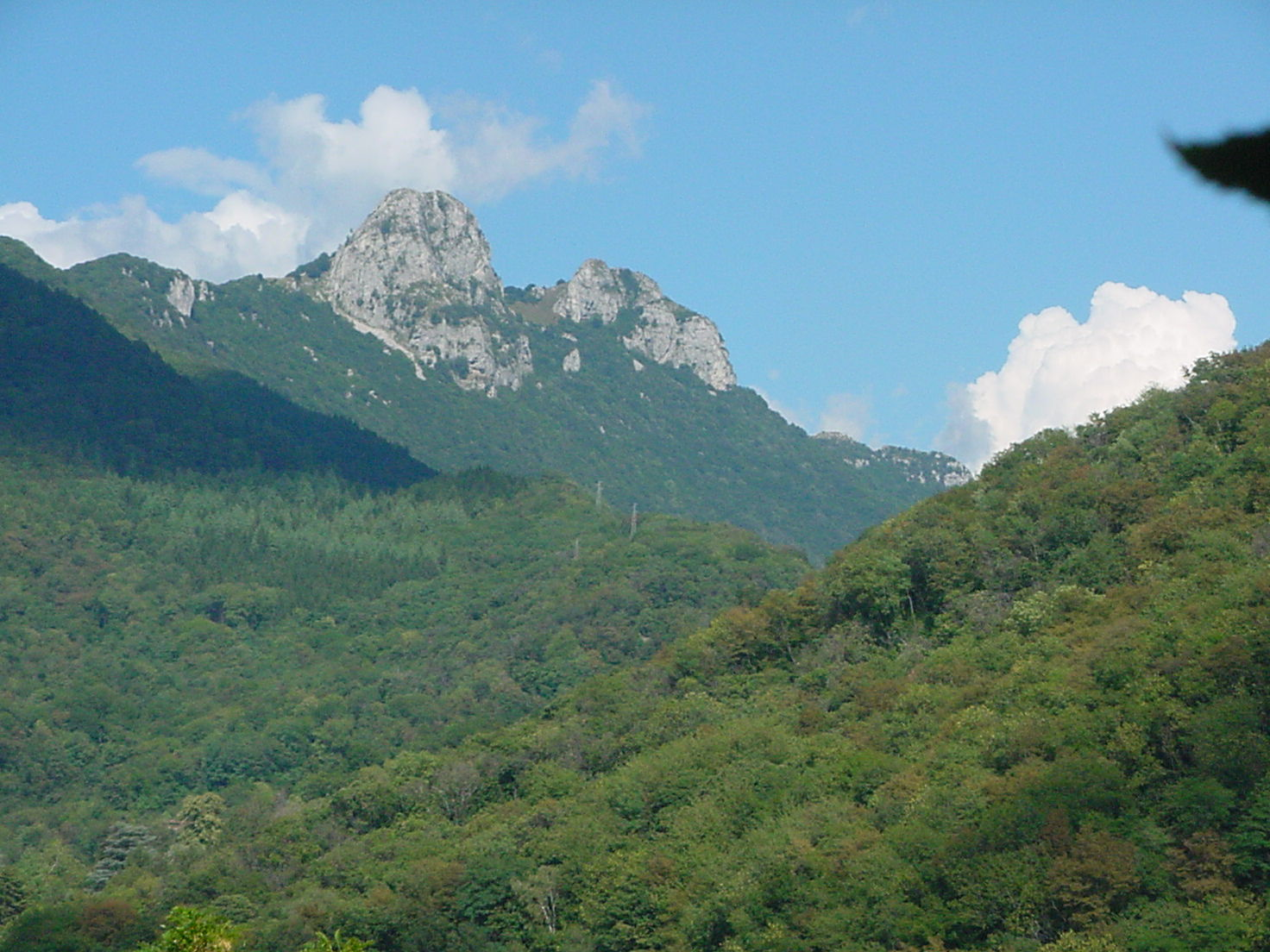
The Corni di Canzo.

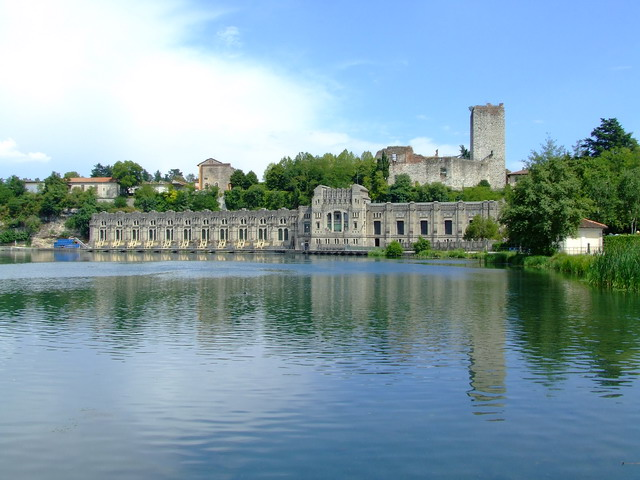
Taccani power plant, Trezzo sull'Adda.

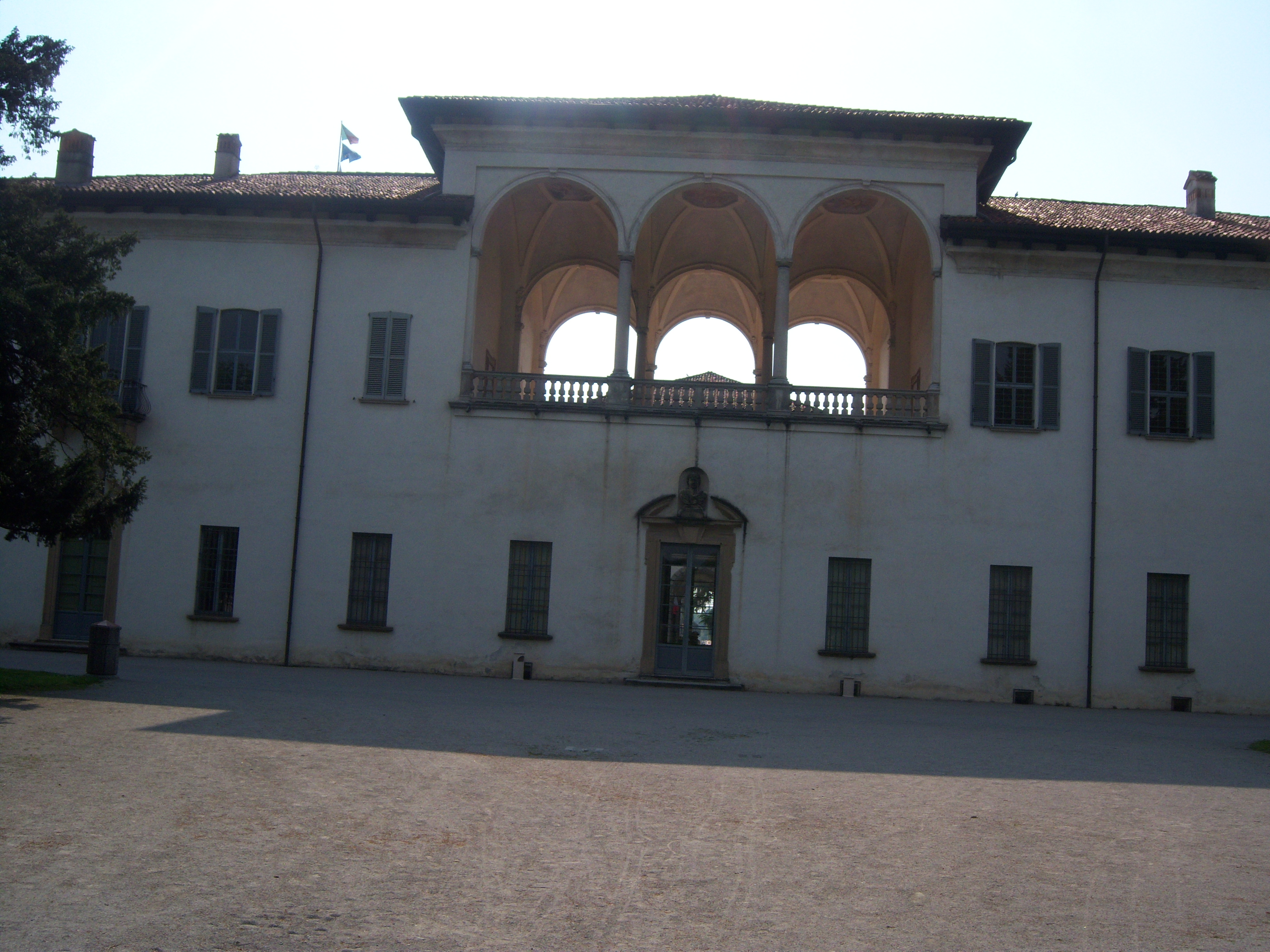
Borromeo Palace, Cesano Maderno.

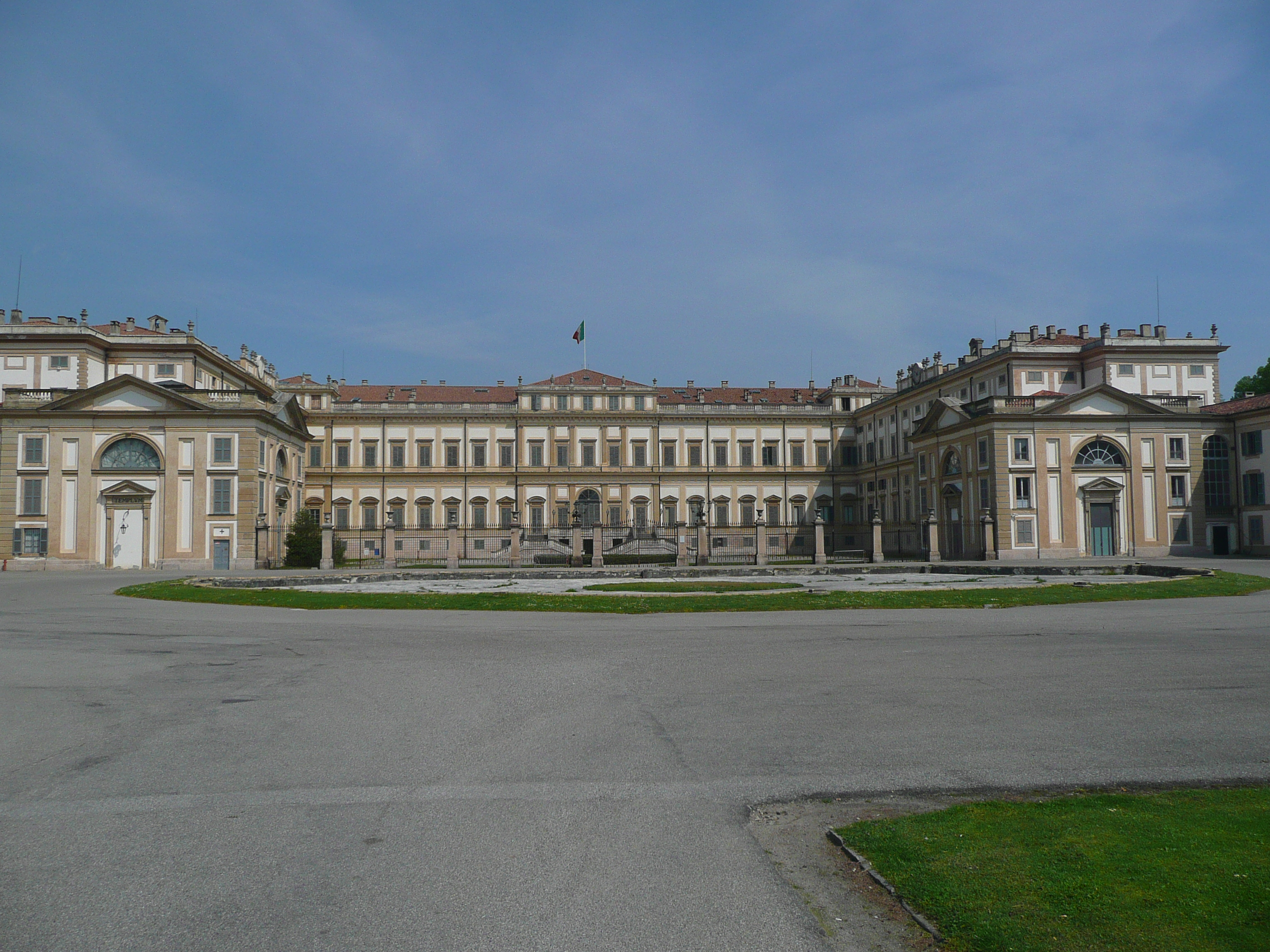
Villa Reale, Monza.

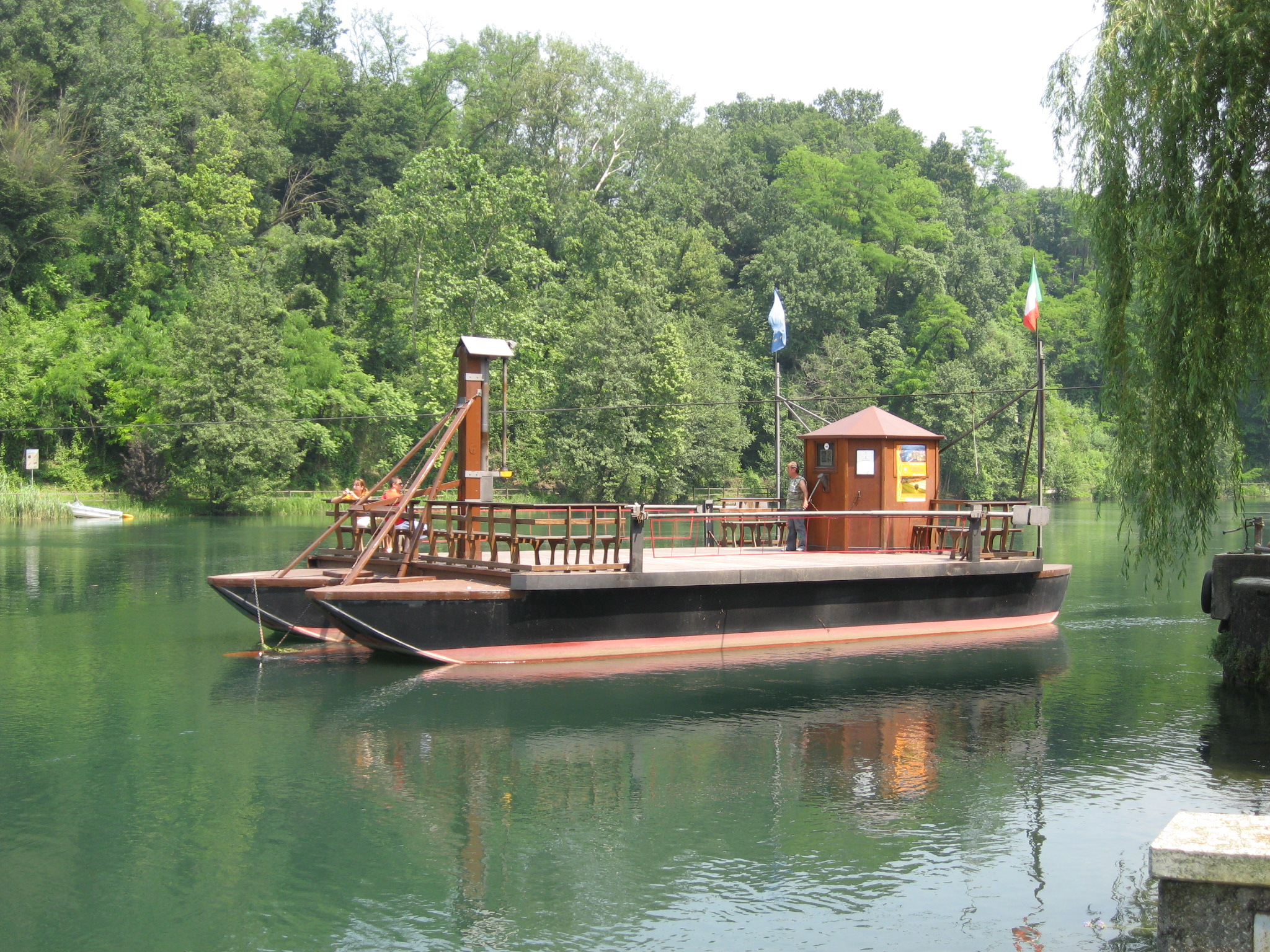
Ferry boat designed by Leonardo da Vinci, Imbersago.

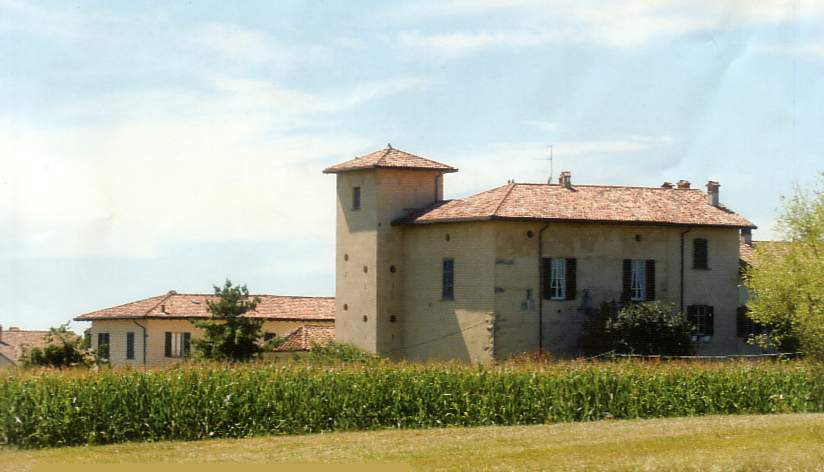
Cascina Rancate, Casatenovo.

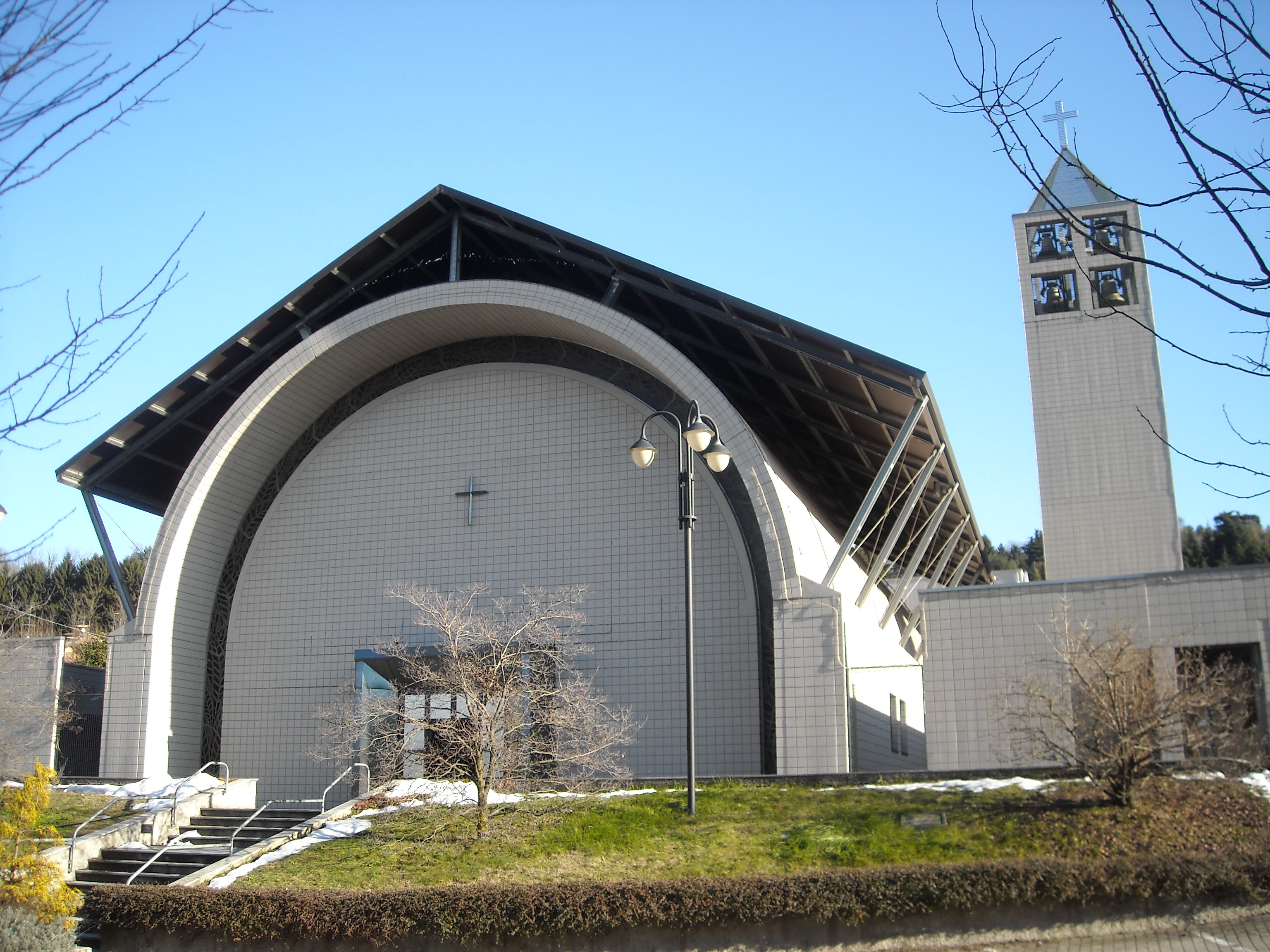
Santa Maria Assunta church, Senna Comasco.

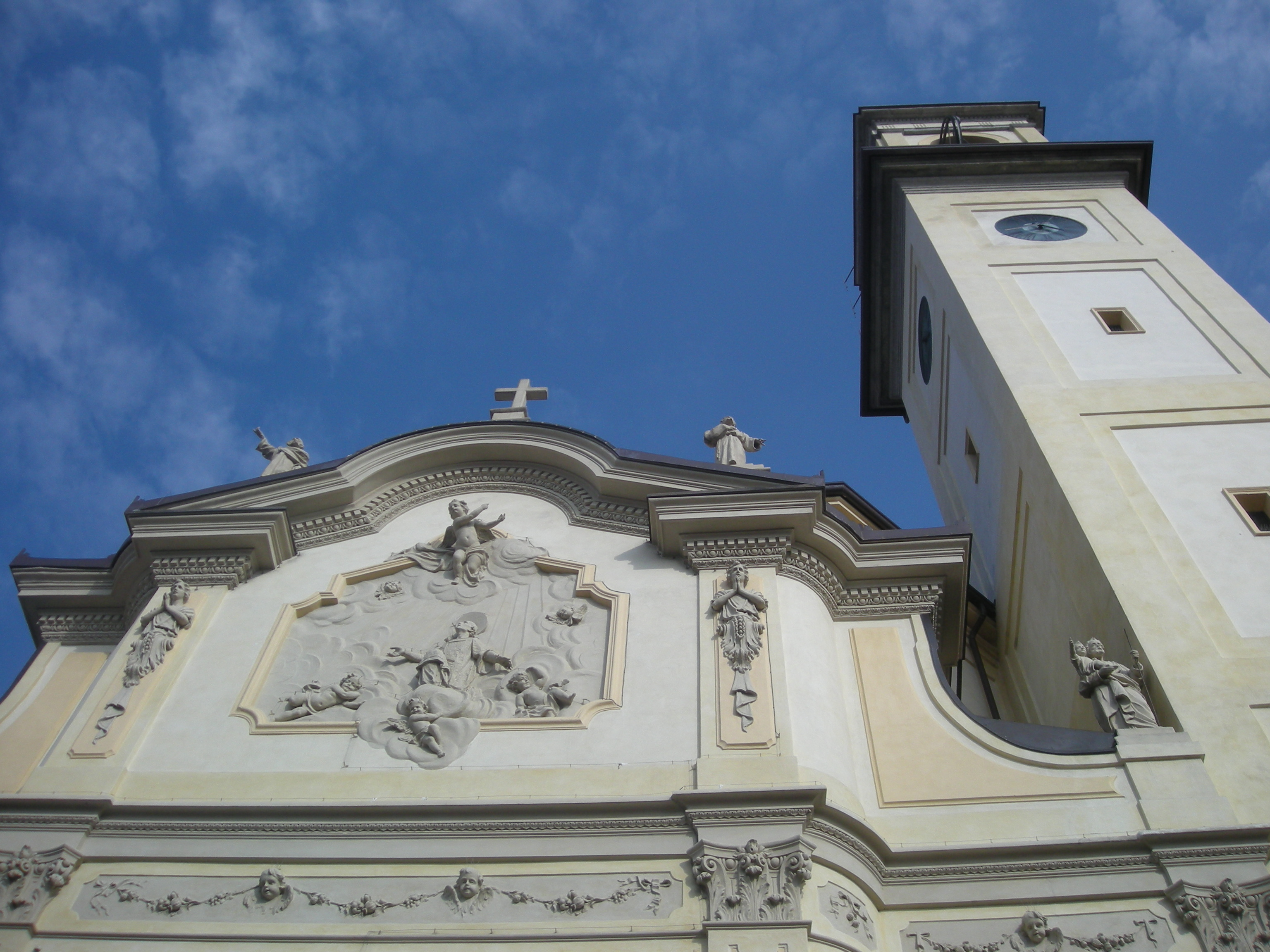
San Lorenzo Martire church, Lazzate.

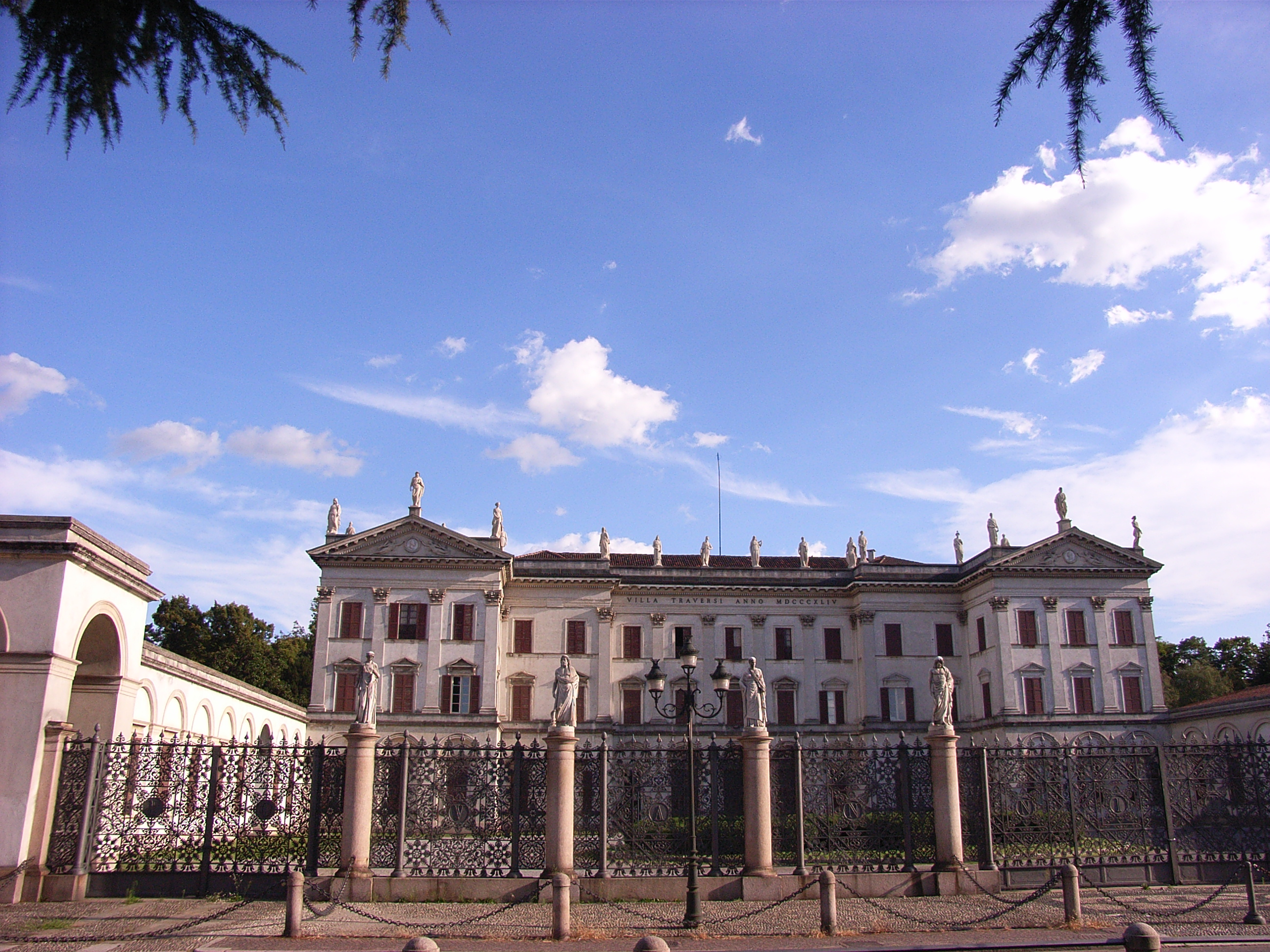
Villa Tittoni Traversi, Desio.

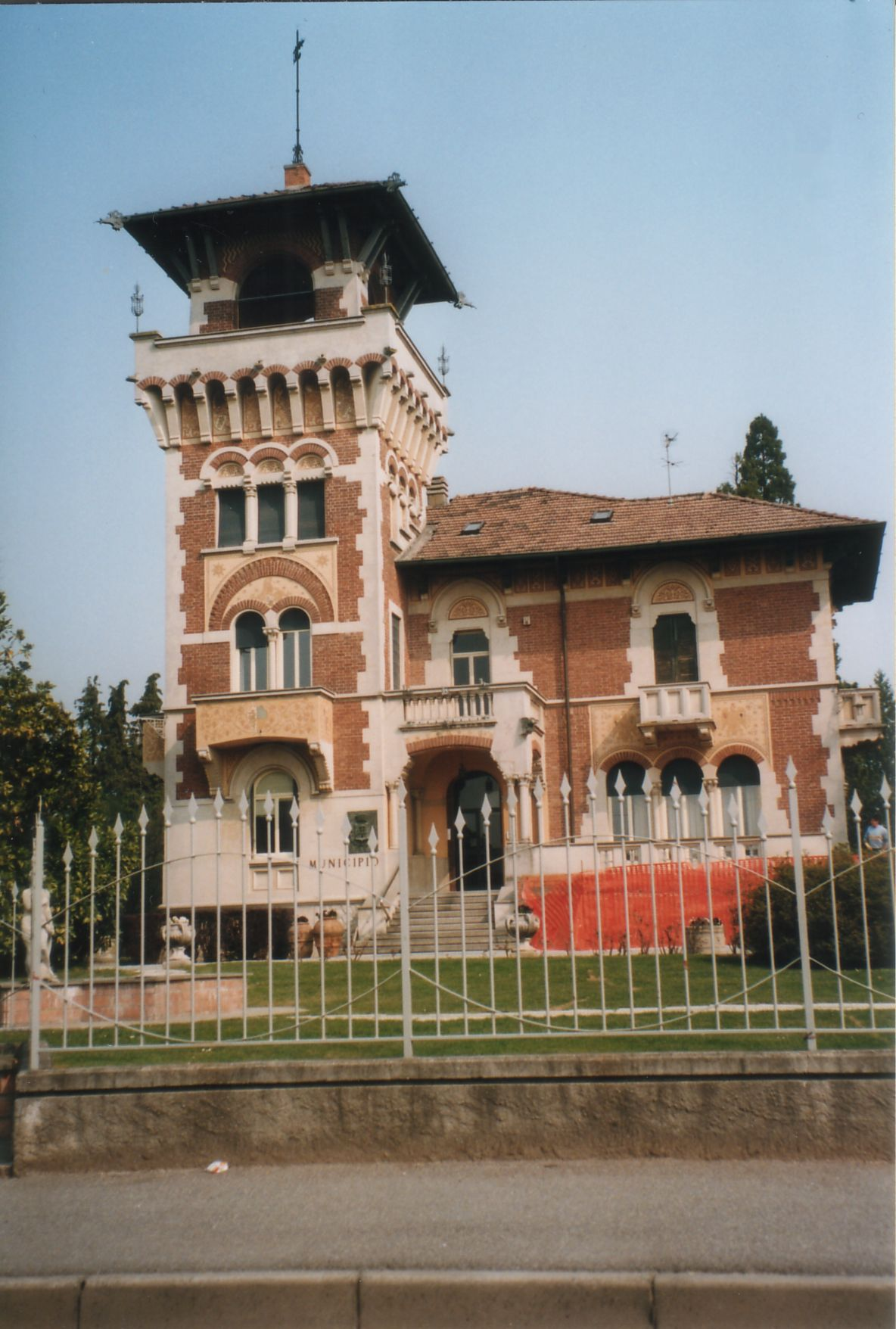
Town hall, Ronco Briantino.

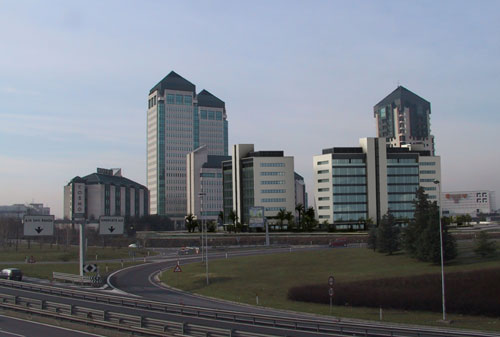
The White Towers, Vimercate.

Brianza (Italian: [briˈantsa], Lombard: [briˈãː(t)sa]) is a geographical, historical and cultural area of Italy, at the foot of the Alps, in the northwest of Lombardy, between Milan and Lake Como.

== Geography ==
Brianza extends from the Canzo area, North of Monza (approximately 14 km from Milan), to the Seveso River on the West and to the Adda River on the East. The southern and western parts are mostly flat, while the northern and eastern parts are mountainous.

Brianza encompasses a part of the administrative area of the Province of Monza and Brianza, a part of the administrative area of the Province of Lecco, a part of the administrative area of the Province of Como and some municipalities of the administrative area of the province of Milan bordering the Province of Monza and Brianza. The main language spoken in this area is Italian and to a lesser extent a dialect of the Lombard language.

Brianza is densely populated, with approximately 1.372 inhabitants/km^{2}, yet remains remarkably fertile for farming. Due to its hilly nature, it is a favorite summer resort for the people of Milan. Its economy includes the production of furniture and tools. The agro-industrial technology and high-tech economies have expanded in recent years.

== Geographic boundaries ==
- To the northeast: hills and valleys from Lake Garlate, up to the beginning the Lambro River on Monte San Primo. To the northwest: hills surrounding the source of the Lambro back down to Tavernerio (which is above Lake Montorfano), continue along the line Lipomo-Capiago Intimiano-Senna Comasco-Casnate con Bernate and end where the Seveso River takes its source on Sasso di Cavallasca.
- Southern borders: beginning of Limbiate, the municipalities along the Canale Villoresi to its confluence in the Adda River.
- Eastern borders: the Adda, after the lakes of Garlate and Olginate, which receives the waters of the Canale Villoresi.
- Western borders: the Seveso River from its source on Sasso di Cavallasca to Paderno Dugnano where it crosses the Canale Villoresi, and the Oltreseveso ("beyond the Seveso") consisting of the municipalities of Cermenate, Lazzate, Misinto, Cogliate, Ceriano Laghetto, Solaro and Limbiate.

== History ==
The area of the modern day Brianza was originally settled in the 2nd millennium BC or even earlier.

Brianza is in Lombardy, the region named after the Longobards, who arrived around the 570s, after the Celtic and the Roman expansion.

The spread of Christianity in Brianza dates back to the 3rd century, owing much to Saint Ambrose. There, St. Augustine of Hippo (as documented by himself in his Confessions) had lived at Rus Cassiciacum (now Cassago), during the period after his conversion and just before his baptism by Bishop Ambrose. In the Middle Ages the Cathars, the Humiliati and the Pataria religious movement rose and fell in several towns of Brianza. The Franciscans flourished instead and remain to the present day. Most of the region follows the Ambrosian Rite of the Catholic Church in communion with the Pope in Rome.

Brianza was home to many distinguished figures in poetry, philosophy and history of medicine among them are:

- Cesare Cantù
- Piero Corti
- Luigi Giussani
- Giuseppe Parini
- Giovanni Battista Scalabrini
- Alberto da Giussano
- Aribert, Archbishop of Milan
- Pope Pius XI
- Filippo Turati
- Andrea Dell'Orto
- Simona Brambilla
- Sergio Sala

== Agriculture ==
Brianza has some widespread open-field crops such as: corn, wheat, barley, triticale and soybeans

== Names ==
In Italian, lower Brianza is referred to as bassa Brianza and upper Brianza is alta Brianza.

The name Brianza may be derived from the Celtic word brig ("hill"), or the Latin name Brigantia which originated from some colonies of the Brigantes, or Brigantii, a Celtic sub-tribe of Alps and Prealps that were Romanized and after the Barbarian invasions emigrated. According to another tradition, when the Celtic leader Bellovesus founded Milan, his chief lieutenant Brianteo conquered a surrounding geographical area, which was thenceforth named Briantia or Brianza.

Brianteo/Briantea/Briantei/Briantee, Briantino/Briantina/Briantini/Briantine, and Brianz(u)olo/Brianz(u)ola/Brianz(u)oli/Brianz(u)ole are all terms for the people of the Brianza. Briantitudine is a name that claims the identity of the Brianza with its population and its culture.

== Bibliography ==
- Antonini A. M., Vocabolario Italiano Milanese, Libreria Milanese – Milano 1996.
- Arrighi C., Dizionario milanese-italiano con repertorio italiano-milanese - Hoepli, Milano 1896 (rist. 1999 e 2005).
- Arsaln E., L'architettura dal 568 al Mille, Storia di Milano, Milano, 1954.
- Bascapè G. - Arte e storia dei giardini in Lombardia - Cisalpino Goliardica Milano, 1962
- Bazzetta De Vemenia N., Dizionario del gergo milanese e lombardo -, 1939.
- Beaumont S. E, ‘Factory Visit, U Illinois, 2002
- Beretta C. Grammatica del milanese contemporaneo - Libreria milanese, 1998.
- Beretta C., Dizionario milanese-italiano - Vallardi, 2002
- Bernasconi E., Lissonum. Notizie di Lissone, Monza, Tipografia Sociale Monzese, 1926
- Bosisio A., et Al, Storia di Monza e della Brianza, Edizioni Il Polifilo, Milano,1973.
- Breislak S. - Descrizione geologica della Provincia di Milano - Imperiale Regia Stamperia, Milano, 1822
- Candeloro, G., Storia dell'Italia moderna, Milano, Feltrinelli, 1986.
- Ceppellini V., Dizionario grammaticale, Istituto Geografico De Agostini, Novara, 2005
- Chiesa Isnardi G., I miti nordici, Ed. Longanesi, Milano, 1997
- C. Erba: inventario e notizie dell'archivio del Comune di Erba dal 1801 al 1949 redatto il 30-11-1950
- C. Lissone, Studi e ricerche nell'area del mobile: le affinità elettive. La Brianza e Lissone. Appunti per un'"altra " storia del design, Arti grafiche Meroni, 1985.
- Cantù C. - Grande illustrazione del Regno Lombardo Veneto, Milano, 1857
- Cantù C. - Storia di Milano e sua provincia - F. Sardini, Milano, 1974
- Casiraghi L., Brianza Romana, Grafica Salvioni SNC, Renate, 1992
- Cattaneo C. - Notizie naturali e civili sulla Lombardia - Milano, 1844
- Cattaneo P., Brianza. Un mondo che cambia, Cattaneo Ed., Oggiono, 1998
- Cedro A., et al. - Brianza e Lecchese, dimore rurali - Jaca Book, Milano, 1985
- Cherubini F, Vocabolario milanese-italiano, Milano, Imperial Regia Stamperia, 1856, 4 vol. (rist. anast. Milano, Martello, 1968) .
- Chambers I., Migrancy, Culture, Identity, Routledge, London, 1994.
- Cons. Com. 1994–1998 : provincia... della Brianza....; C.Lissone, archivio.
- Cormio L. - La Civica Siloteca Cormio. Istituto sperimentale del legno - "Milano", Milano, 1942.
- Copeta C., Realtà sociali e paesaggio simbolico, Unicopli, Milano, 1990.
- Dal Re M. - Ville di delizia o siano palagi camperecci dello Stato di Milano - 1743, (ried. a cura di F. P. Bagatti Valsecchi, Milano, 1963)
- Di Giacomo F, analisi di due linee evolutive del cromosoma Y in Eurasia occidentale", Università degli Studi di Roma “Tor Vergata”, 2005
- Diocesi Milano e studi di storia locale della chiesa Milanese. Tessere per un mosaico, Ubaldo Valentini e B. Malusardi eds, San Giuliano Milanese, 1983.
- Doranlo R. E., « La Civitas des Lexovii et ses abornements », dans Revue des études anciennes, 1932
- Fabi M. - "Grande illustrazione del Lombardo-Veneto", Milano, 1858
- Ferrarini G., A. Stadiotti A., M. Stadiotti M., Seregno: un paese, la sua storia, la sua anima – Telesio editrice – Carnate 1999.
- Fossati D. - La Valle del Lambro da Carate a Monza - Tesi di laurea, Istituto di Geologia Università degli Studi di Milano, Milano, 1983
- Girino E, Dizionario di finanza. Tecniche, strumenti, IPSOA ED, 2005
- Giulini A. "Architettura e storia lombarda", 1917
- Gualdoni F., Dal premio alla Pinacoteca, Casa Editrice Silvana Editoriale, Cinisello Balsamo, 2000
- Kraatz,. et Al, "Merletti", A. Mondadori editore Mi, 1988
- Ingegnoli V., et al. - Dinamica storica del territorio milanese, nei suoi rapporti con la struttura fluviale - Atti del convegno sulla tutela della natura e i parchi fluviali, Italia Nostra, Milano, 1971
- Linneo C., Instructio peregrinatoris, in Amoenitates Accademicae, Leida 1760
- LoC Class :Lombard Street : a description of the money market, by Walter Bagehot; 2003
- Lose F., C.- Viaggio pittorico nei monti di Brianza corredato di alcuni cenni storico-statistici, diviso in 24 vedute disegnate, incise e dipinte in acqua tinta da Federico e Carolina Lose, Milano, 1823 (ried. 1959)
- M. Mauri, D.F. Ronzoni. Ville della Brianza. Ediz. italiana e inglese vol. 2. Missaglia, Bellavite. 2004. ISBN 88-7511-031-X.
- M. Mauri, D.F. Ronzoni. Ville della Brianza. Ediz. italiana e inglese vol. 1. Missaglia, Bellavite. 2003. ISBN 88-7511-005-0
- Mauri Michele, Piazze in Brianza. Ediz. italiana e inglese. Missaglia, Bellavite. 2006. ISBN 88-7511-066-2.
- Mauri Michele, Parco di Montevecchia e della Valle del Curone. Cuore verde di Brianza. Missaglia, Bellavite. 2006. ISBN 88-7511-051-4.
- Missaglia S., Lissone racconta, Lissone, Comune di Lissone, 1984
- Nangeroni G., -Il Monte Barro (Prealpi lombarde). Note di geomorfologia. Natura, Soc. It. di Scienze Naturali e Museo Civico di Storia Naturale di Milano, 1972
- Nicoli F., Grammatica milanese, Bramante Editore, 1983.
- Parini G., Odi, 1764–1793
- Pavia L., Sulla parlata milanese e i suoi connessi, 2001 .
- Picasso G, Tagliabue M., Seregno : una comunità di Brianza nella storia (secoli XI – XX) – Comune di Seregno - Seregno 1994
- Pizzagalli A.M., A la scoeula de lengua del Verzee,1944.
- Redaelli S., Teruzzi R.: Laura Mantegazza la garibaldina senza fucile, Verbania-Intra, Alberti Libraio Editore, 1992
- Regione Lombardia, carta dei parchi, delle riserve e dei monumenti naturali regionali, scala 1:250.00 - Settore Ambiente ed Ecologia, Regione Lombardia, Istituto Geografico De Agostini, Novara, 1995
- Regione Lombardia, carta del sistema delle aree protette regionali, scala 1:250.000 - Direzione Generale Tutela ambientale, Regione Lombardia, Istituto Geografico De Agostini, Novara, 1998
- Ronzoni D. F. - Il Parco Regionale della Valle del Lambro - Bellavite Editore in Missaglia, 1998
- Rosa M. - I Villoresi a Monza. I giardini e il Parco Reale - in "Rivista di Monza" anno. XVI, nn 5-6, Milano, 1938
- Sartorio M. - "La Lombardia pittoresca o Disegni di ciò che la Lombardia chiude di più interessante per le arti la storia la natura levati dal vero da Giuseppe Elena", Antonio Fortunato Stella e figli eds, Milano, 1836
- Spinelli F., I lombardi in Europa. Nomi, sedi, operatività, rapporti con le autorità; 2006.
- Tacito, Annali, Tacito, Storie
- Verri P., Storia di Milano,1797

== Gallery ==
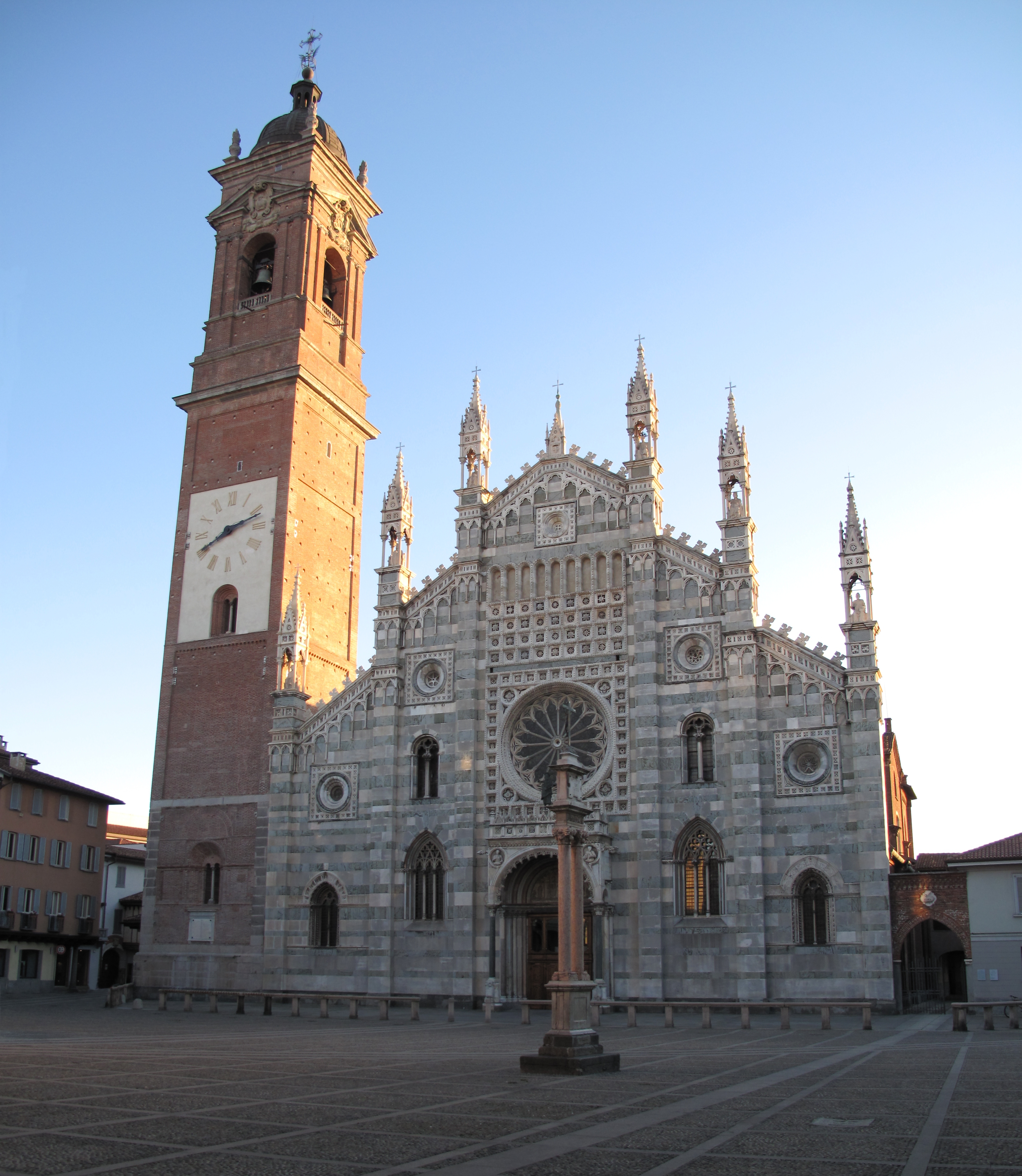
Monza

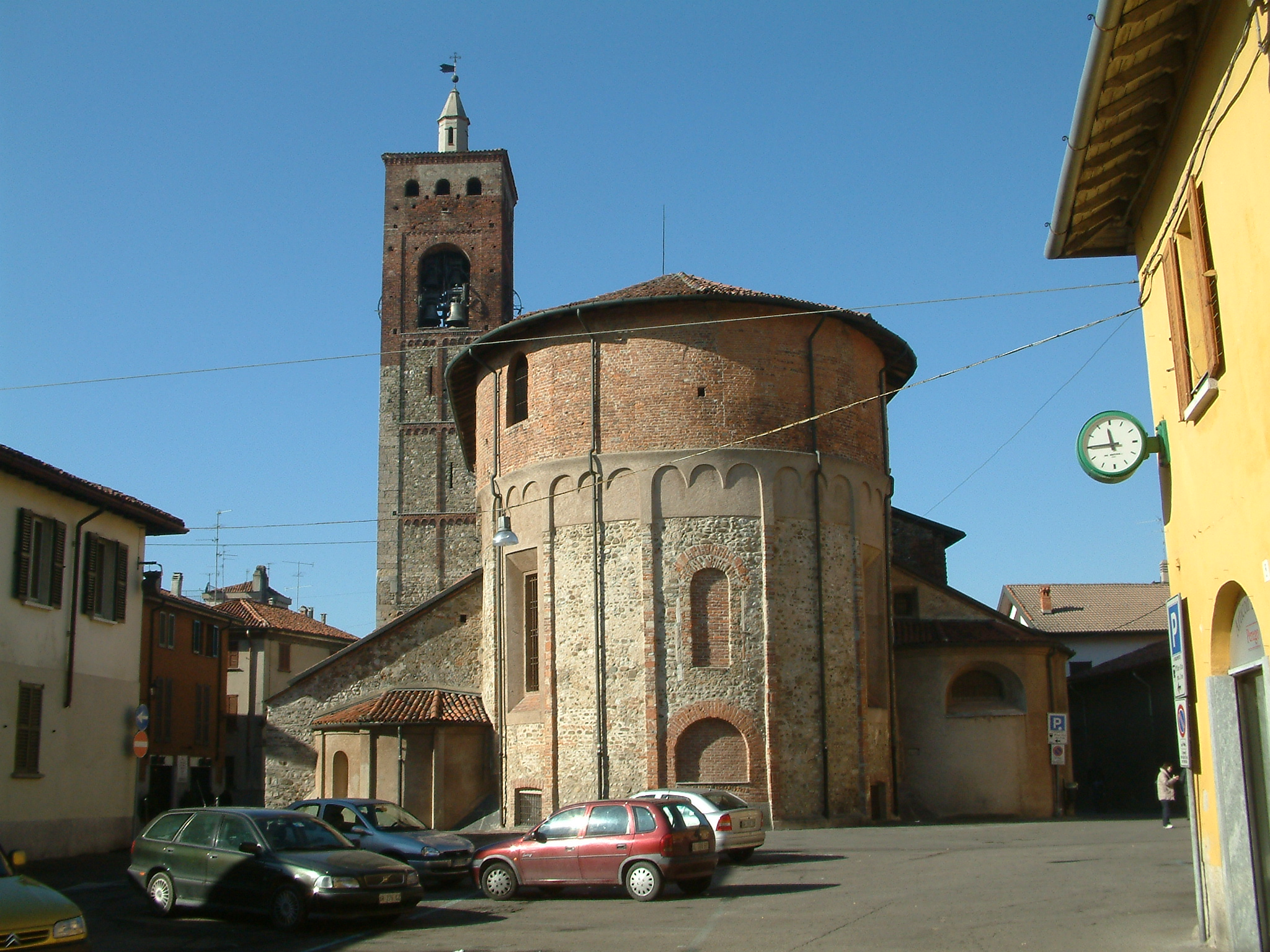
Vimercate

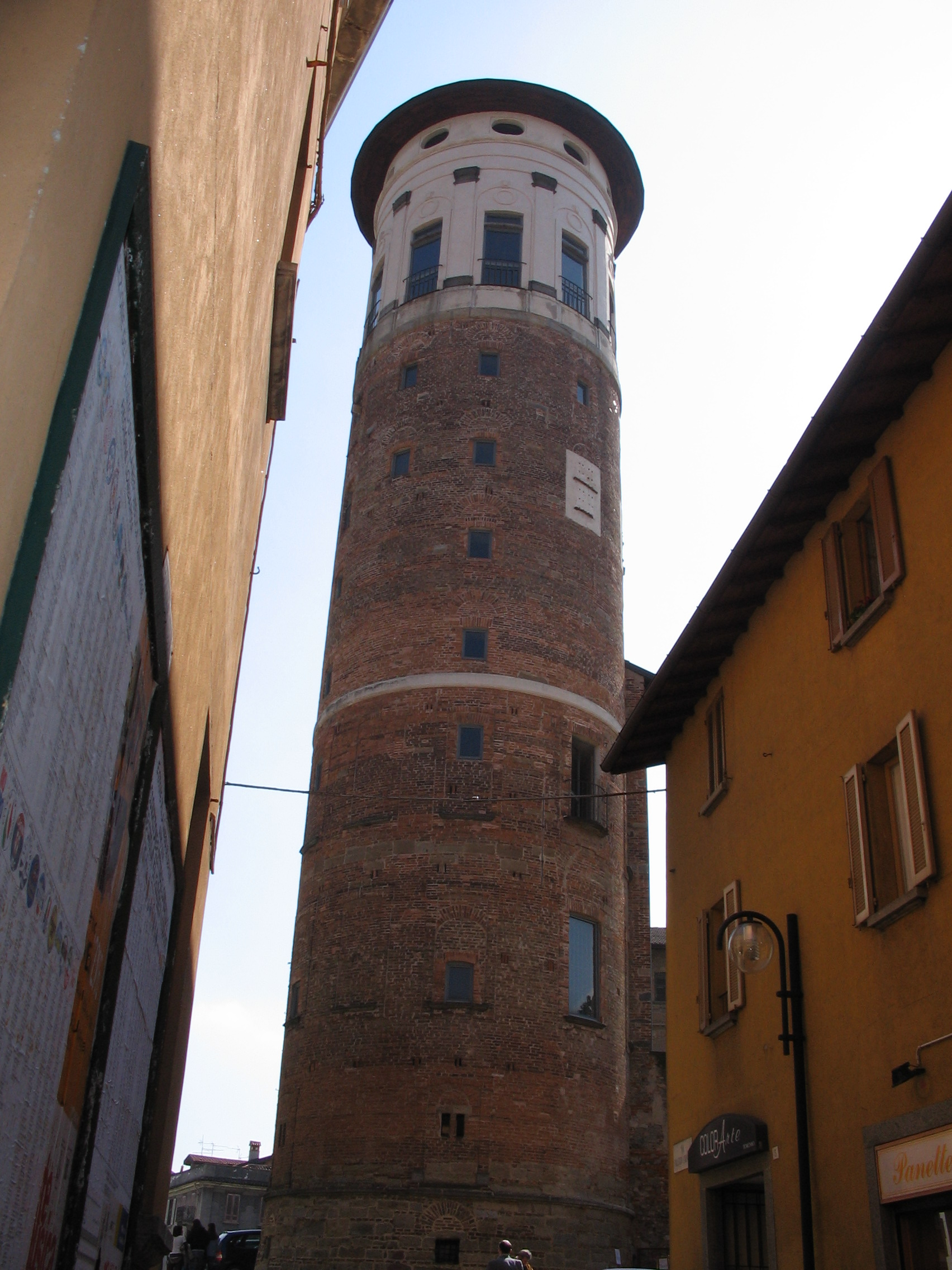
Merate

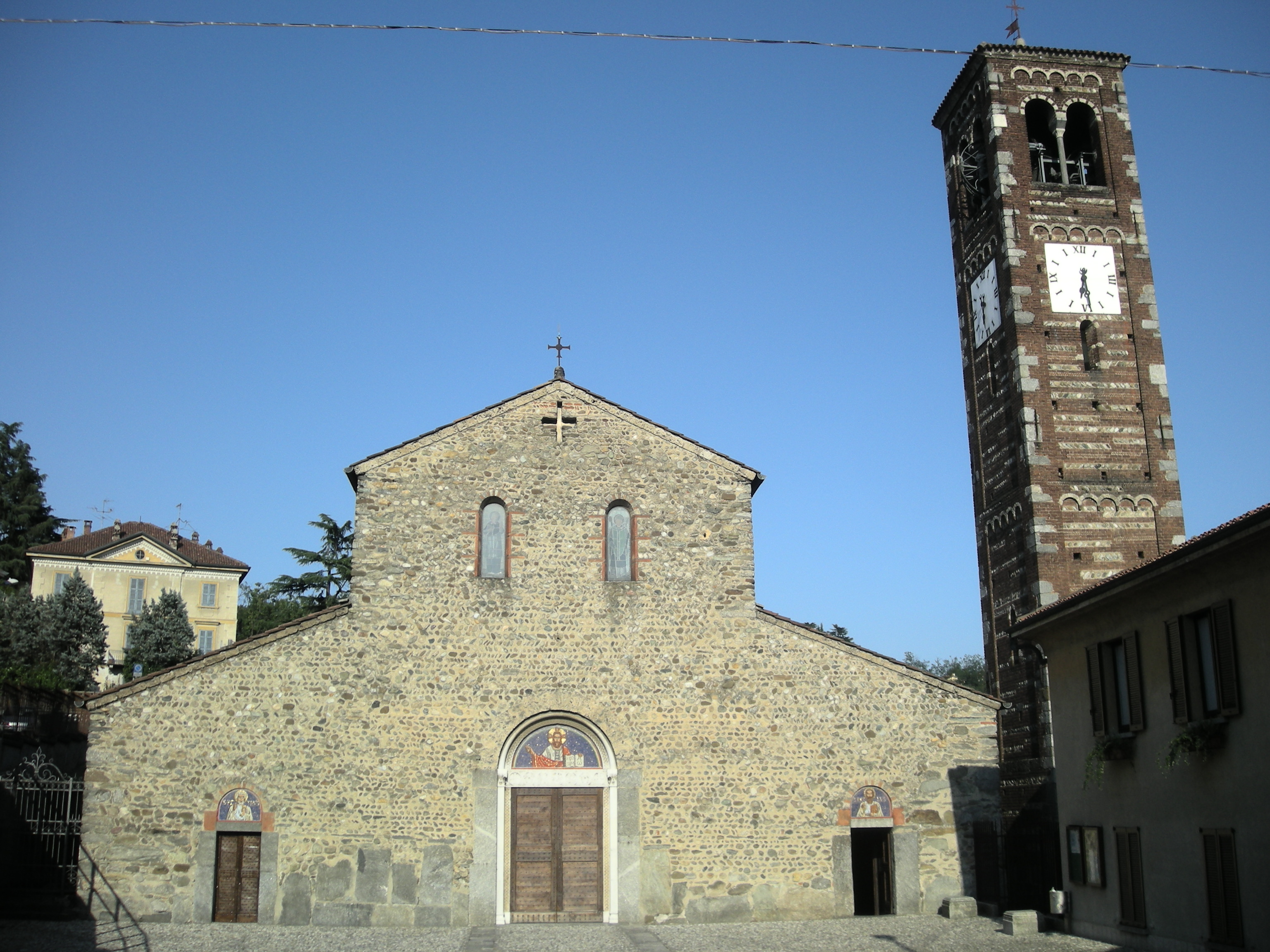
(Agliate, Carate Brianza)

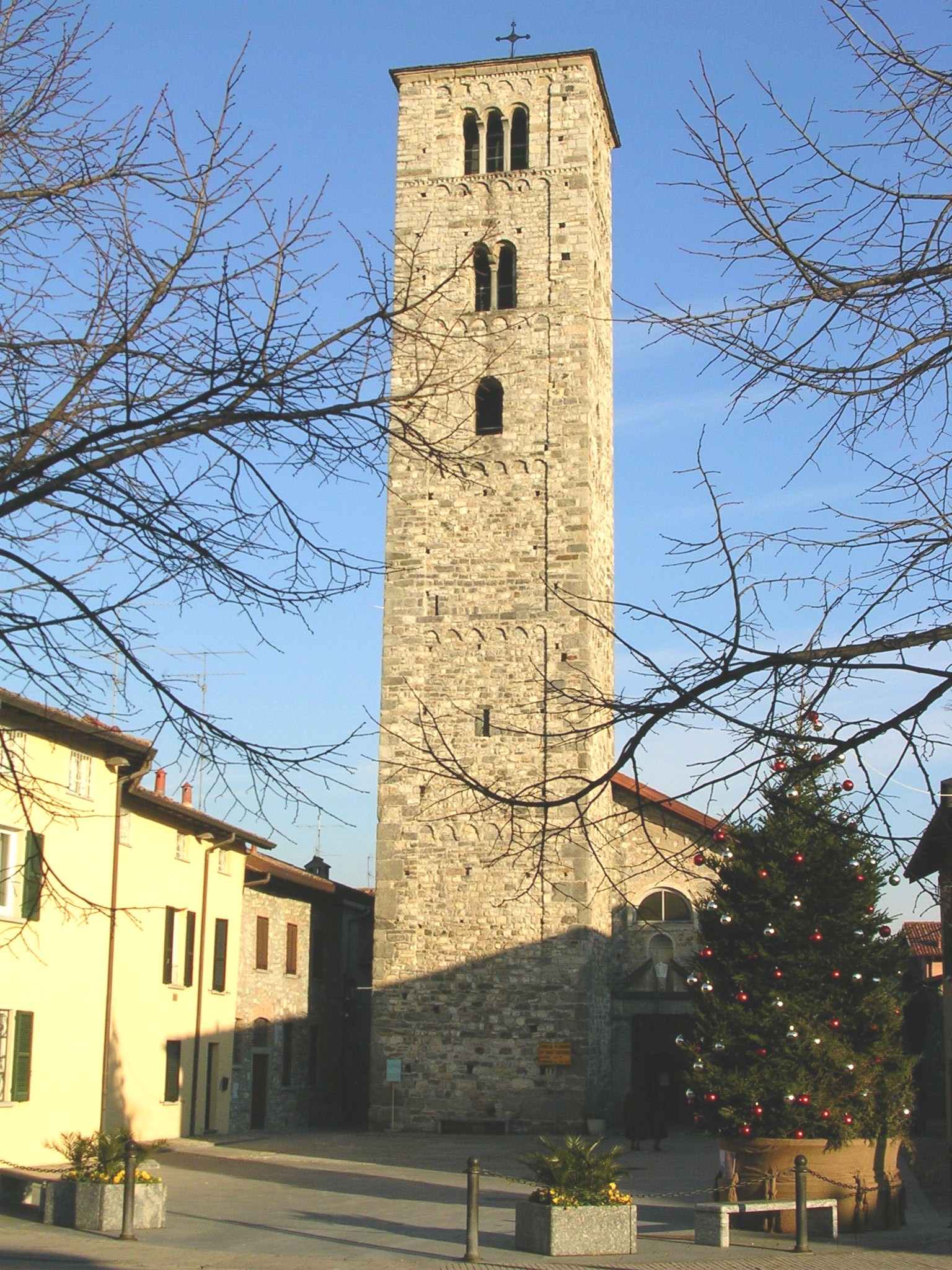
Erba, Lombardy

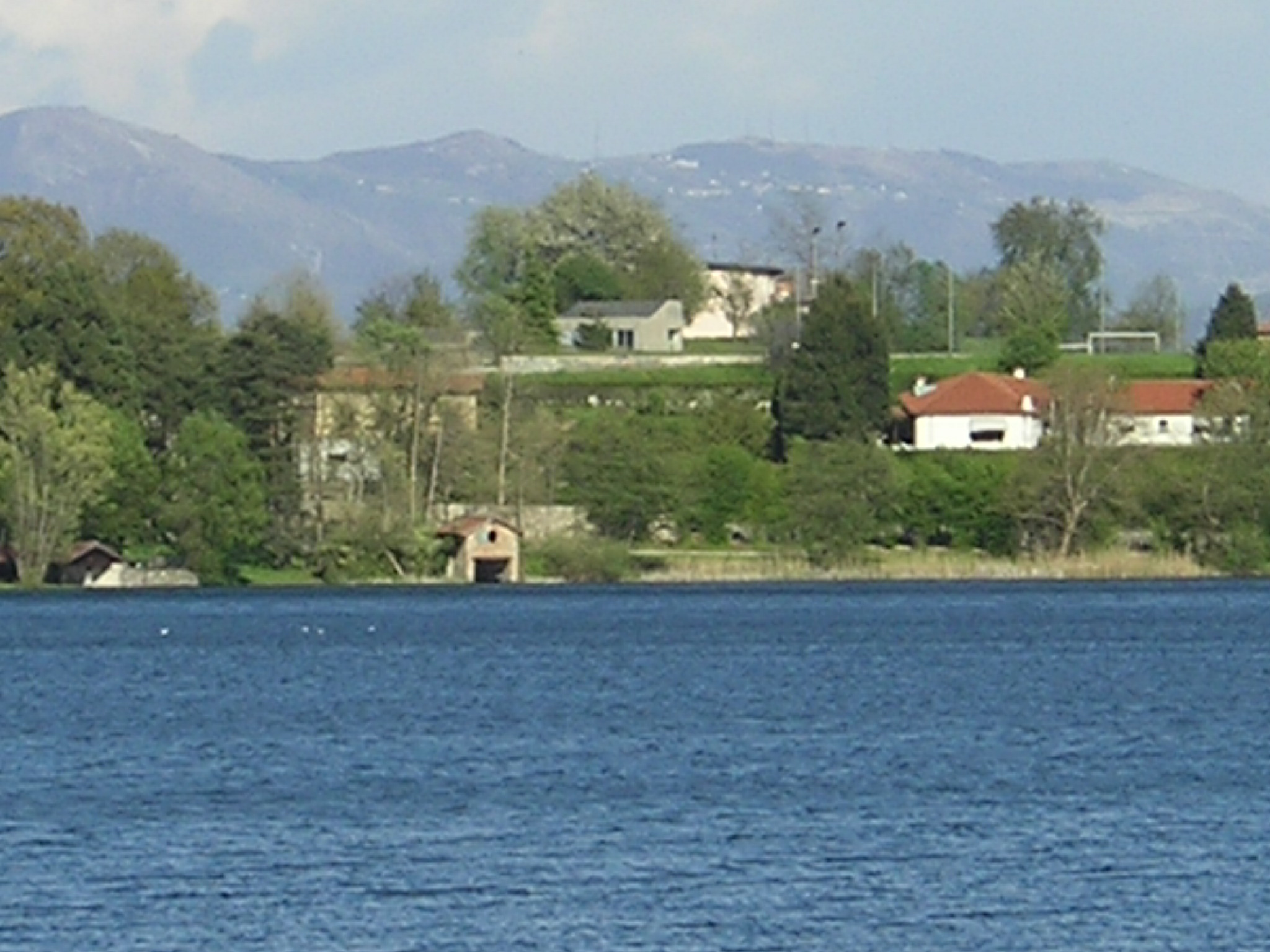
Montorfano

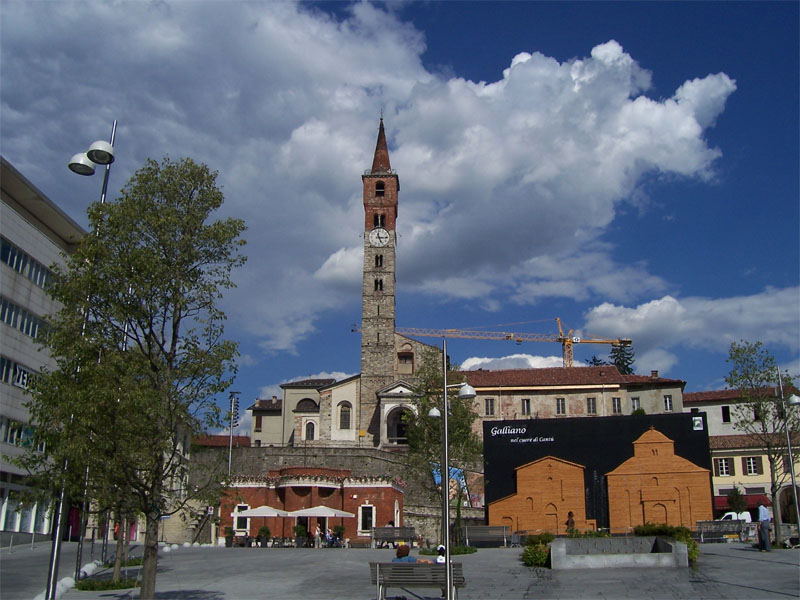
Cantù
