= Lipomo =

Lipomo Lipòmm (Lombard)
- Comune
- Comune di Lipomo
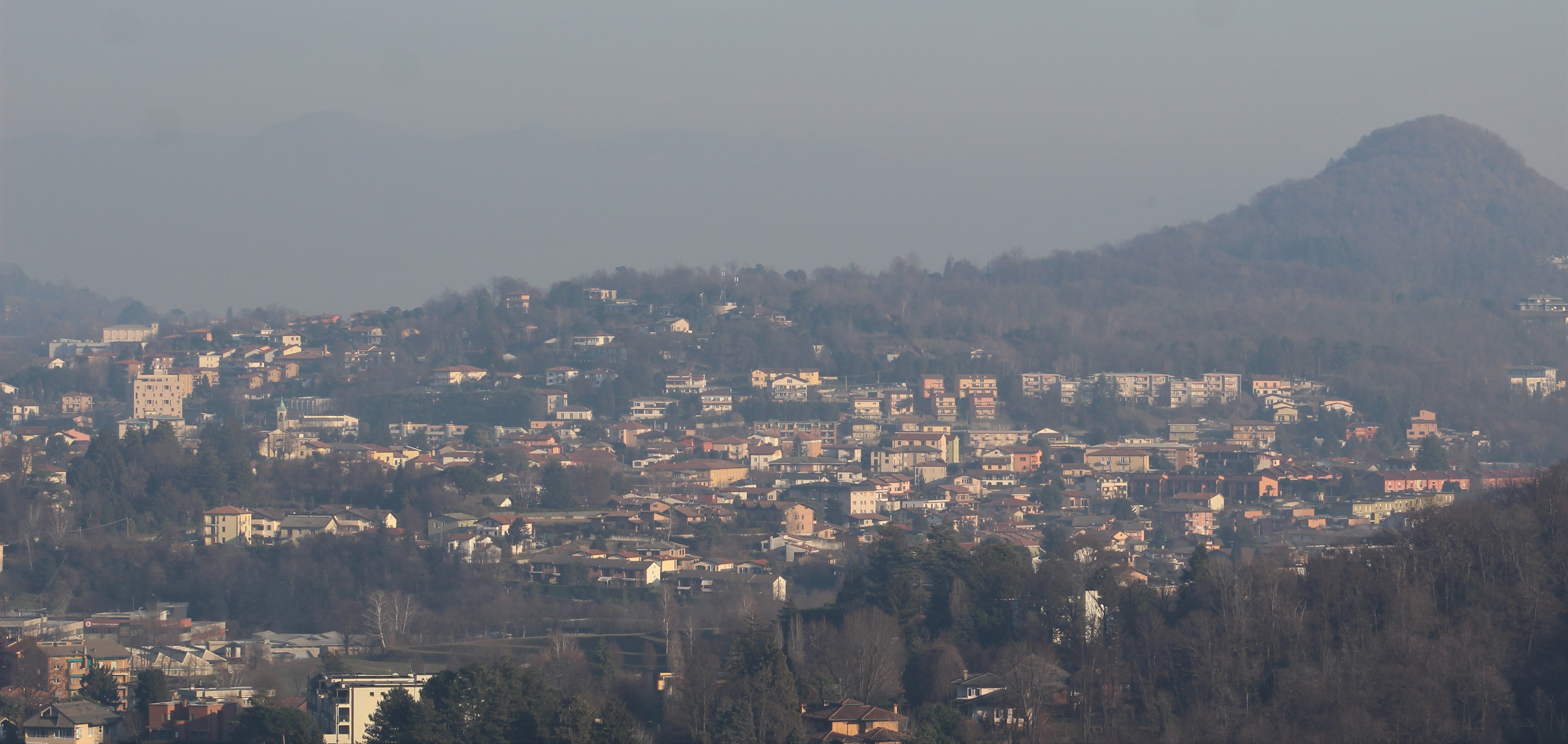
- View of Lipomo from Castello Baradello

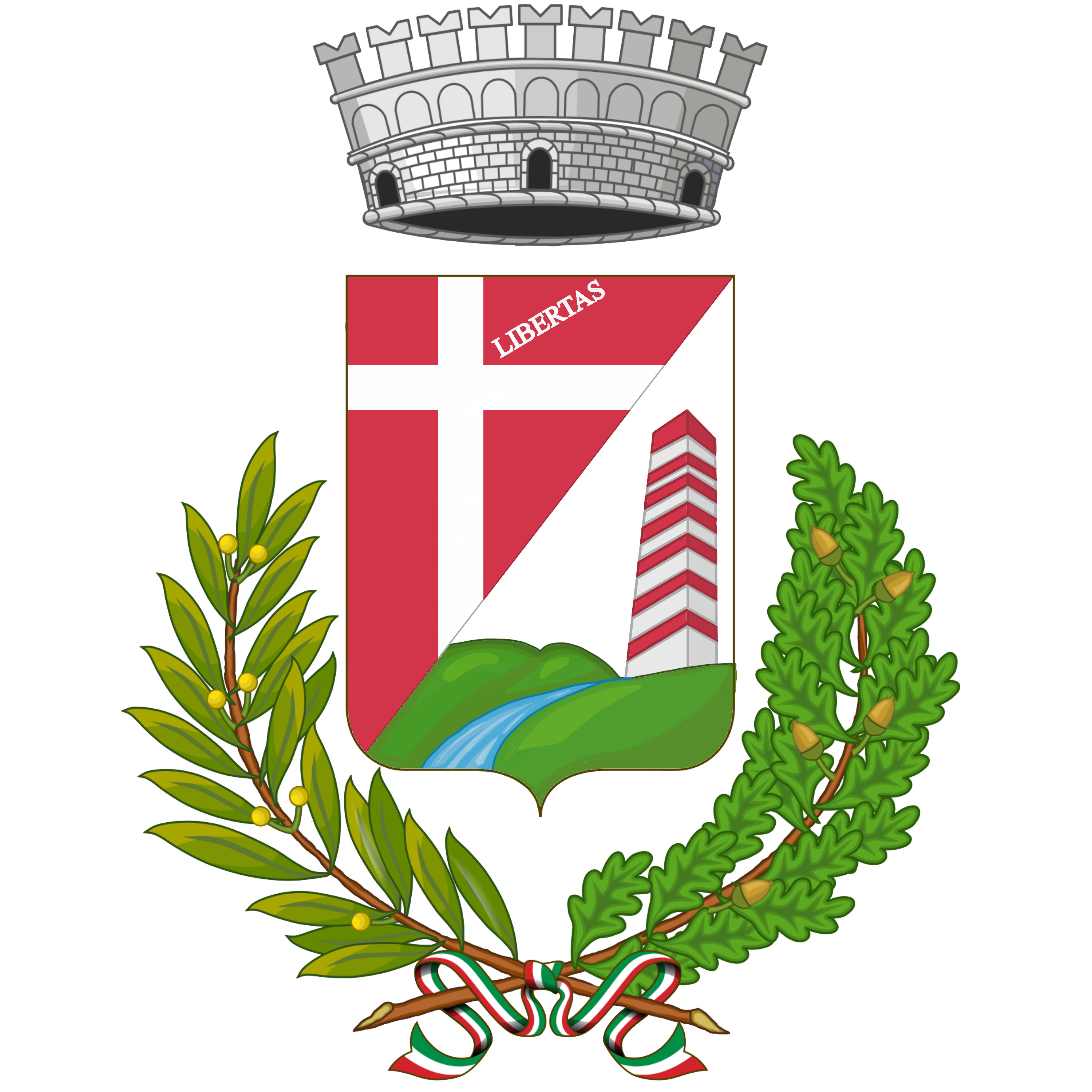
- Coat of arms

- Location within Italy Location within Lombardy
- Coordinates: 45°48′N 9°7′E
- Country: Italy
- Region: Lombardy
- Province: Province of Como (CO)

Area
  - Total: 2.5 km^{2} (0.97 sq mi)
- Elevation: 384 m (1,260 ft)

Population (Dec. 2004)
  - Total: 5,758
  - Density: 2,300/km^{2} (6,000/sq mi)
- Demonym: Lipomesi
- Time zone: UTC+1 (CET)
  - Summer (DST): UTC+2 (CEST)
- Postal code: 22030
- Dialing code: 031
- Website: Official website

Lipomo (Brianzöö: Lipòmm [liˈpɔm]) is a comune (municipality) in the Province of Como in the Italian region Lombardy, located about 35 kilometres (22 mi) north of Milan and about 3 kilometres (2 mi) southeast of Como. As of 31 December 2004, it had a population of 5,758 and an area of 2.5 square kilometres (0.97 mi^{2}).

Lipomo borders the following municipalities: Capiago Intimiano, Como, Montorfano, and Tavernerio.

== History ==
A forerunner of modern-day Lipomo was presumably founded in Roman times, at the time when Julius Caesar conquered Como. For all the imperial era, Lipomo, given its proximity to Como and on a hill, may have been a shelter from the invasions of barbaric populations coming from the Lario area.

In the Middle Ages, Lipomo was a small village which was attacked and almost completely destroyed by the inhabitants of nearby Cantù in 1050, a battle which took place in the context of the disputes between the major local powers of Como and Milan. When in 1535 the Duchy of Milan fell under Spanish domination, Lipomo – like all the villages of the Pieve di Zezio in North Lombardy – followed the same fate; in 1656 the commune freed itself from feudal subjection by paying a duty based on the number of families present in the area. That was a decision of the Spanish government, which, in search of new funds to replenish the always troubled state coffers, in 1647 had decided to sell certain areas as a fiefdom to a Milanese and Spanish aristocratic family, leaving the centers included in the area itself the possibility of redeeming themselves against the payment of money. However, Lipomo later entered under the domain of the De Herra family, of distant Spanish ancestry, who – until the early 20th century – owned a vast part of the agricultural land and real estate assets of Lipomo. When Napoleon I conquered Lombardy, Lipomo was added to District XXII of Como, while with the advent of the Cisalpine Republic it moved into District I of Como. Following the coronation of Napoleon as Emperor on March 6, 1805, Lipomo was then included in the Canton II of Como, incorporated into the aforementioned District I of Como and becoming a suburb of Como. Some members of the growing Lipomo middle-class took part in the Italian Wars of Independence (1860) and World War I. After World War II, which left the community particularly impoverished, in 1946, the De Herra family and their latest heirs belonging to the Melano di Portula and Tanzi families, sold all the remaining real estate and agricultural properties. A rapid and turbulent industrial development took place with a consequent demographic increase, particularly in the textile and mechanical industries.

== Demographic evolution ==
Historical population

Year	Pop.	±%
1861	481	—
1871	503	+4.6%
1881	455	−9.5%
1901	451	−0.9%
1911	398	−11.8%

Year	Pop.	±%
1921	358	−10.1%
1931	579	+61.7%
1936	600	+3.6%
1951	695	+15.8%
1961	924	+32.9%

Year	Pop.	±%
1971	2,586	+179.9%
1981	5,240	+102.6%
1991	5,784	+10.4%
2001	5,523	−4.5%

Source: Data from ISTAT
