= Antonio Cassi Ramelli =

Italian architect (1905–1980)

- Born: 12 April 1905; Milan, Kingdom of Italy
- Died: 23 August 1980 (aged 75); Capiago Intimiano, Lombardy, Italy
- Education: Polytechnic University of Milan
- Occupations: Architect, designer

Antonio Cassi Ramelli (12 April 1905 – 23 August 1980) was an Italian architect, academic and designer.

== Life and career ==
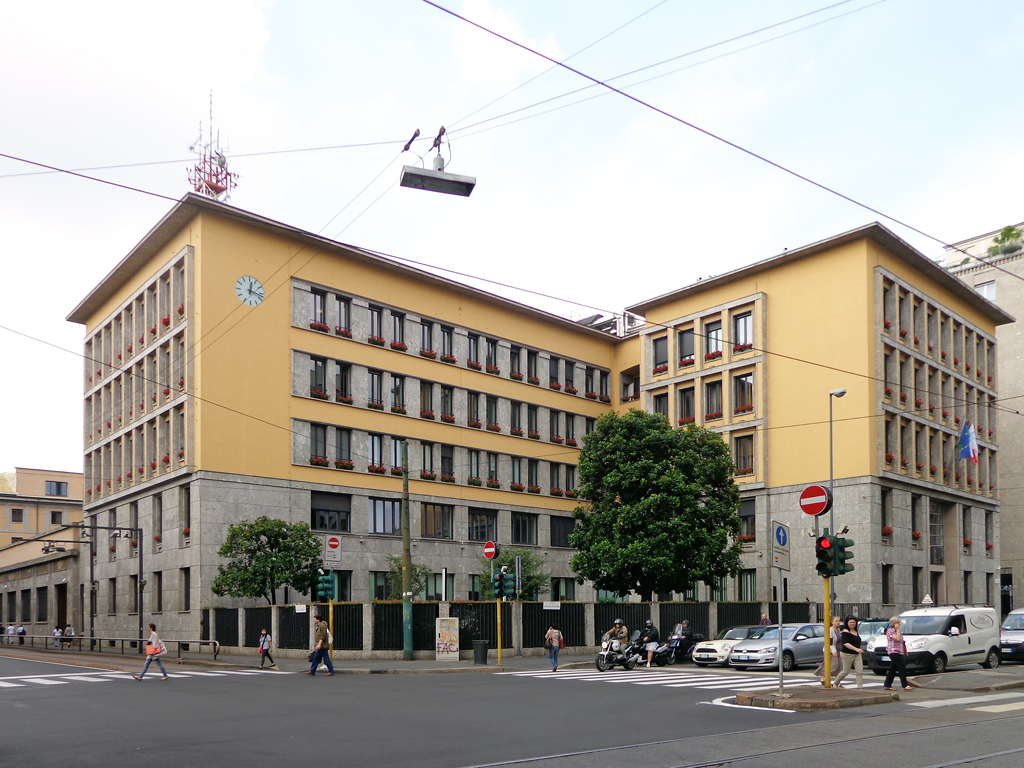
The AEM headquarters in Milan

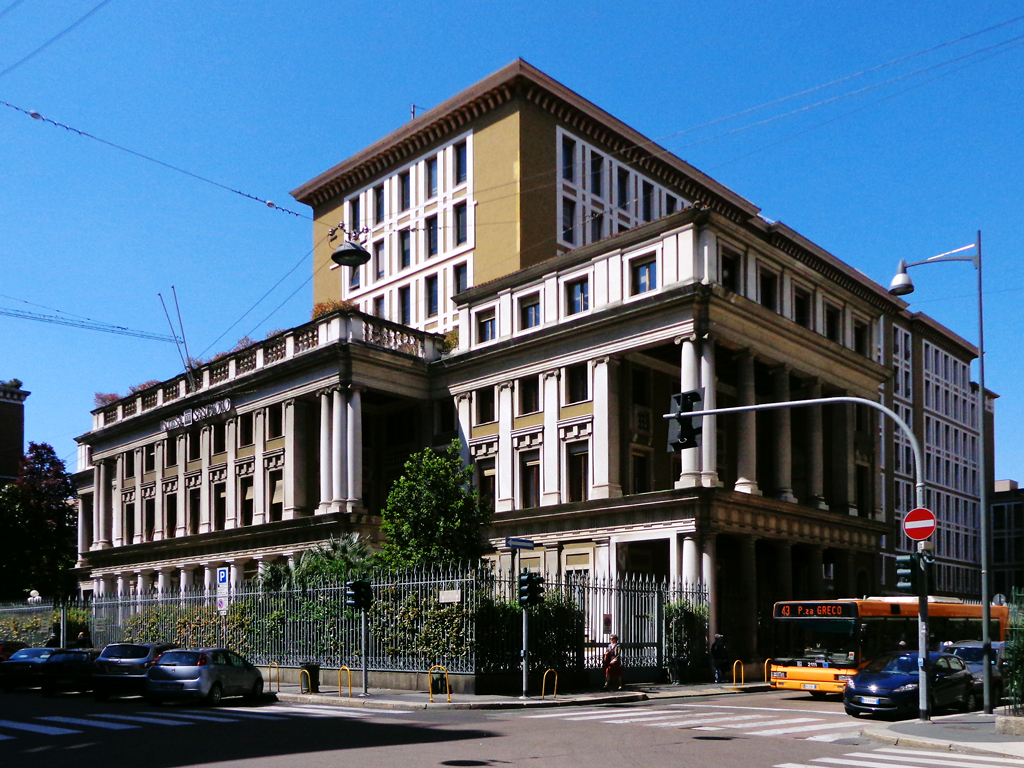
Snia Viscosa headquarters in Milan

Cassi Ramelli studied at the Polytechnic University of Milan, enrolling in 1922 and graduating in 1927, and obtained a diploma in architectural drawing from the Brera Academy in 1926. He began his professional activity in the same period, working alongside Giuseppe Biella and Paolo Buffa.

During the 1930s he established himself as an architect, served on the building commission of the Municipality of Milan, published studies on lighting, and in 1936 received the Gold Medal for Interior Design at the Milan Triennial. In 1937 he joined the faculty of the Polytechnic University of Milan, and in 1938 was commissioned by the municipality to oversee the reconstruction of the Teatro Lirico.

Recalled to military service in 1941, he was discharged due to illness; the wartime bombings of Milan destroyed his home and studio. After the war he resumed both his design work and his editorial activity, becoming a prominent figure in the city's reconstruction and subsequent economic boom. In addition to architectural projects, he worked in furniture design, interior design, painting and architectural criticism.

Among his principal works are Palazzo Perego, the AEM headquarters, several Alemagna retail spaces, interior designs for the ocean liner Andrea Doria, and projects for Alfa Romeo. In 1954 he won the professorship in Building Layout Studies. Between 1953 and 1956 he contributed to the redesign of major urban areas in Milan. From 1957 to 1965 he served on the board of the Veneranda Fabbrica del Duomo, supervising restorations of stained-glass windows, vaults and the reinforcement of the main spire. His academic publishing includes Logica e realtà degli edifici (1958) and Sillabario di architettura (1959).

Proposed as dean in 1963, he faced student opposition during the university occupations, who criticised him for what they perceived as an overly conservative architectural orientation, particularly in connection with the Snia Viscosa project. In January 1964 he published Dalle caverne ai rifugi blindati, shortly before resigning from his academic posts.

Cassi Ramelli continued his professional, editorial and lecturing activities until his death in Capiago Intimiano, province of Como, on 23 August 1980.

== Sources ==
- Elisabetta Susani, ed. (2005). Cassi Ramelli. L'eclettismo della ragione. Milan: Jaca Book.
