= Senna Comasco =

- Comune
- Comune di Senna Comasco
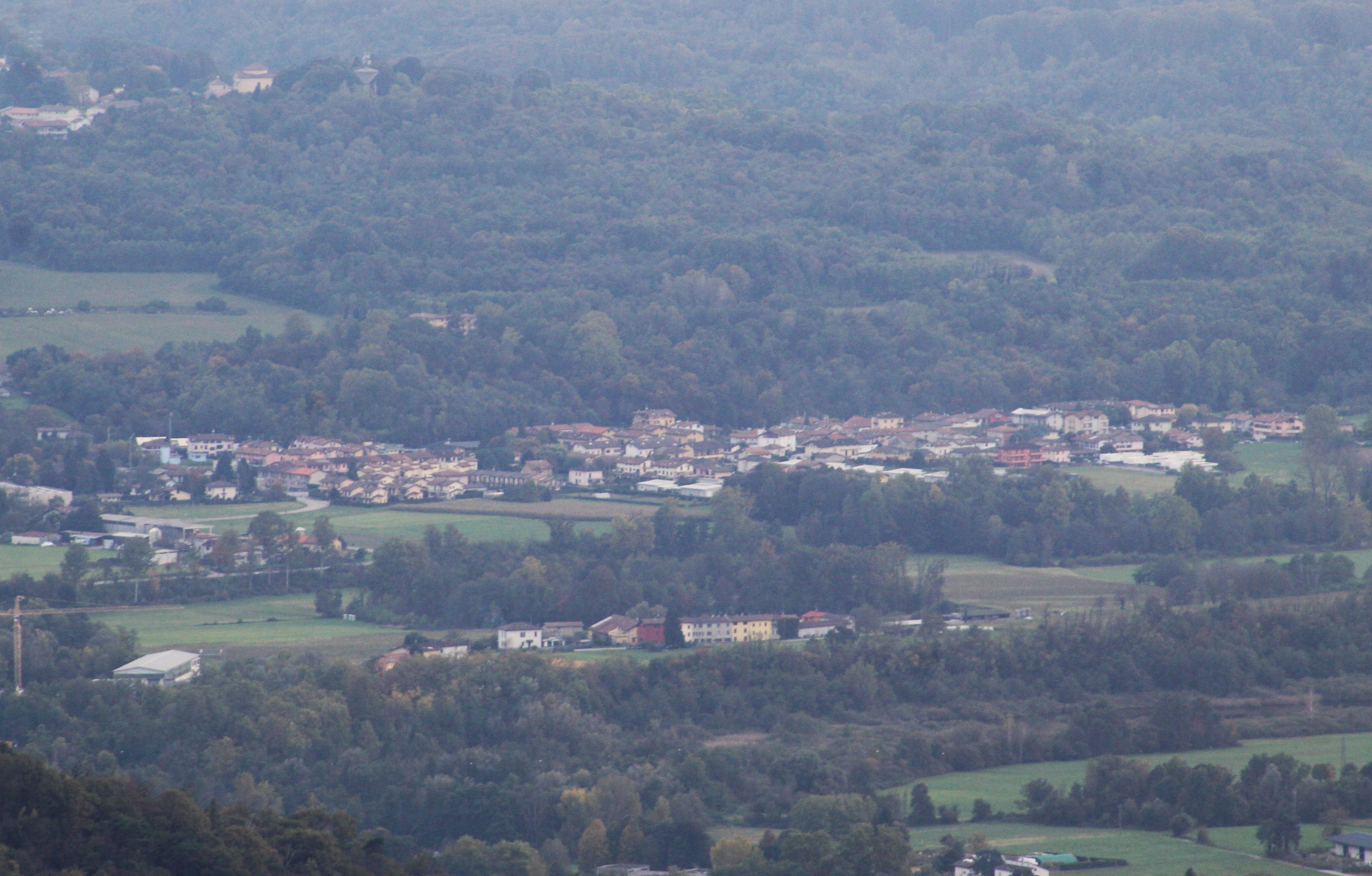

- Location within Italy Location within Lombardy
- Coordinates: 45°46′N 9°6′E
- Country: Italy
- Region: Lombardy
- Province: Province of Como (CO)
- Frazioni: Navedano

Area
  - Total: 2.7 km^{2} (1.0 sq mi)
- Elevation: 296 m (971 ft)

Population (Dec. 2004)
  - Total: 2,995
  - Density: 1,100/km^{2} (2,900/sq mi)
- Demonym: Sennesi
- Time zone: UTC+1 (CET)
  - Summer (DST): UTC+2 (CEST)
- Postal code: 22070
- Dialing code: 031

Senna Comasco is a comune (municipality) in the Province of Como in the Italian region of Lombardy. It is located about 35 kilometres (22 mi) north of Milan and about 6 kilometres (4 mi) south of Como. As of 31 December 2004, it had a population of 2,995 and an area of 2.7 square kilometres (1.0 mi^{2}).

The municipality of Senna Comasco contains the frazione (subdivision) of Navedano.

Senna Comasco borders the following municipalities: Cantù, Capiago Intimiano, Casnate con Bernate, Como, Cucciago.

== Demographic evolution ==
Historical population

Year	Pop.	±%
1861	512	—
1871	511	−0.2%
1881	550	+7.6%
1901	600	+9.1%
1911	564	−6.0%

Year	Pop.	±%
1921	513	−9.0%
1931	485	−5.5%
1936	502	+3.5%
1951	504	+0.4%
1961	665	+31.9%

Year	Pop.	±%
1971	967	+45.4%
1981	1,390	+43.7%
1991	1,726	+24.2%
2001	2,766	+60.3%

Source: Data from ISTAT
