= Tavernerio =

Tavernerio Tavarnee (Lombard)
- Comune
- Comune di Tavernerio
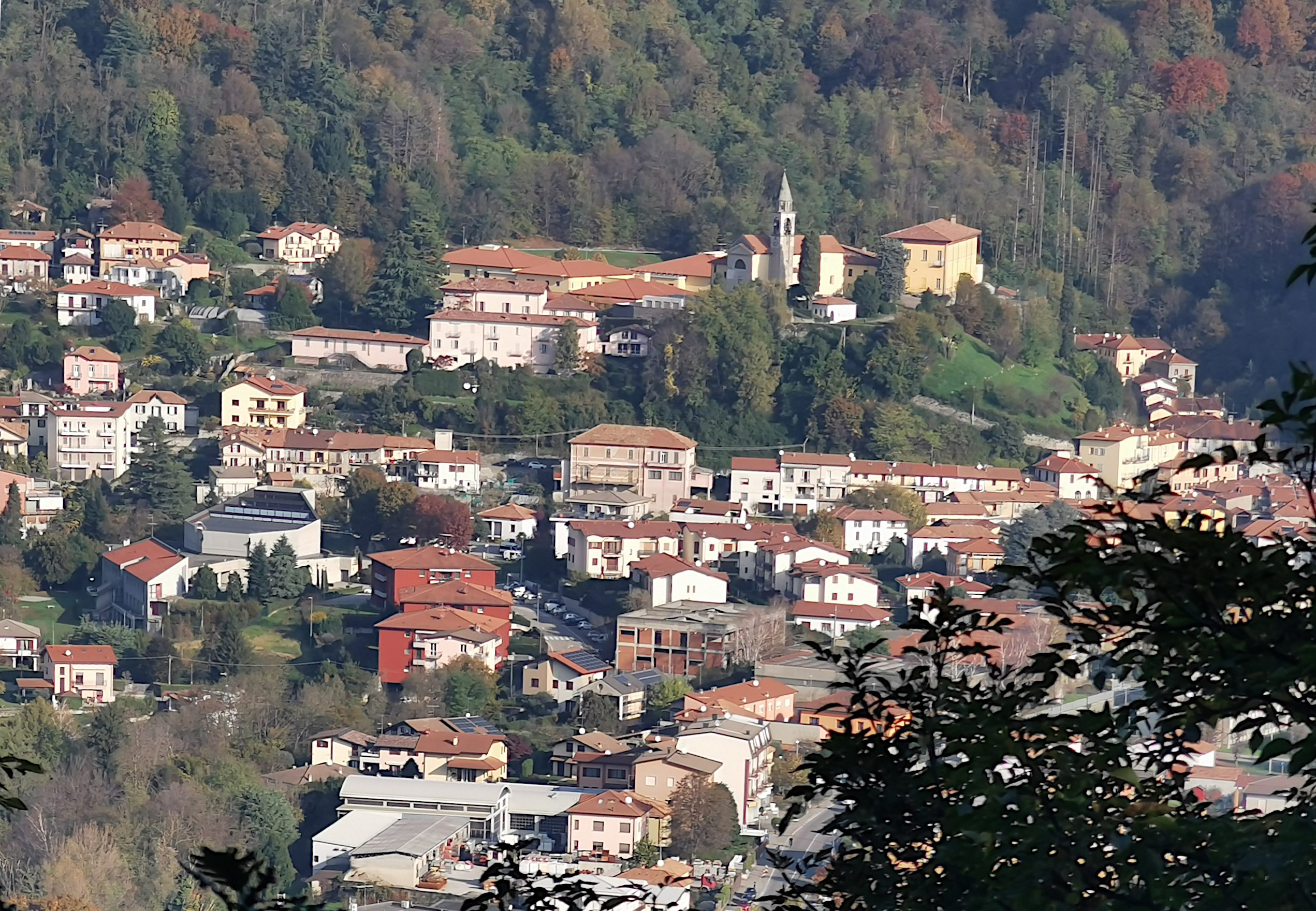

- Location within Italy Location within Lombardy
- Coordinates: 45°48′N 9°9′E
- Country: Italy
- Region: Lombardy
- Province: Como (CO)
- Frazioni: Solzago, Ponzate, Rovascio, Urago

Government
  - Mayor: Mirko Paulon

Area
  - Total: 11.91 km^{2} (4.60 sq mi)
- Elevation: 460 m (1,510 ft)

Population (Dec. 2004)
  - Total: 5,534
  - Density: 464.7/km^{2} (1,203/sq mi)
- Demonym: Taverneriesi
- Time zone: UTC+1 (CET)
  - Summer (DST): UTC+2 (CEST)
- Postal code: 22038
- Dialing code: 031
- Website: Official website

Tavernerio (Comasco: Tavarnee [taʋarˈneː]) is a comune (municipality) in the Province of Como in the Italian region Lombardy, located about 35 kilometres (22 mi) north of Milan and about 6 kilometres (4 mi) east of Como.

Tavernerio borders the following municipalities: Albese con Cassano, Como, Faggeto Lario, Lipomo, Montorfano, Torno.
