= Aribert (archbishop of Milan) =

Roman Catholic Archbishop

His Excellency The Most Reverend Aribert
- Archbishop of Milan
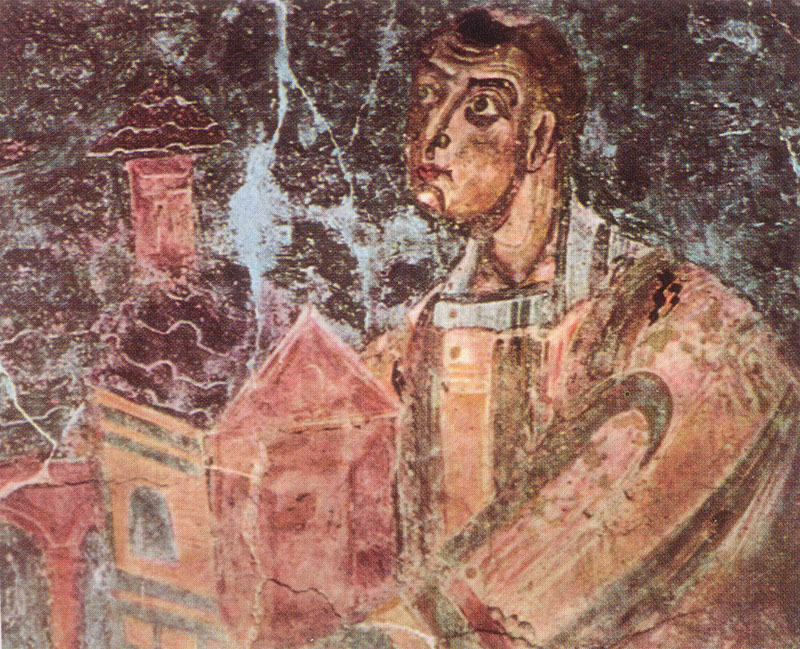
- Ariberto da Intimiano in a Medieval fresco on the Apse of the Basilica of San Vincenzo
- Church: Roman Catholic Church
- Archdiocese: Milan
- Metropolis: Milan
- See: Milan
- Installed: 29 March 1018
- Predecessor: Arnulf II
- Successor: Guido da Velate

Orders
- Rank: Archbishop

Personal details
- Born: Heribert c. 970 Capiago Intimiano, Lombardy, Italy
- Died: 16 January 1045 (aged 74–75) Milan
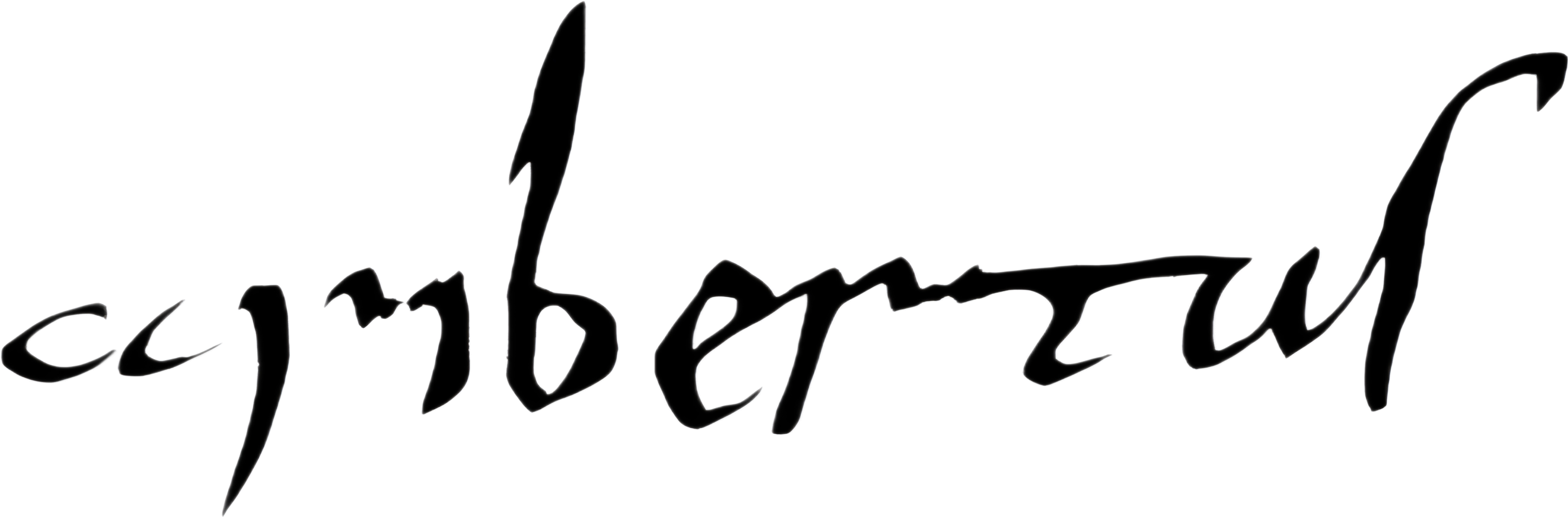
- Signature

- Coat of arms

Aribert (or Heribert) (Italian: Ariberto da Intimiano, Lombard: Aribert de Intimian) (Intimiano, between 970 and 980 – Milan, 16 January 1045) was the archbishop of Milan from 1018 to 1045. According to Yves Renouard, "Aribert was one of the greatest politicians of 11th-century Italy".

== Biography ==
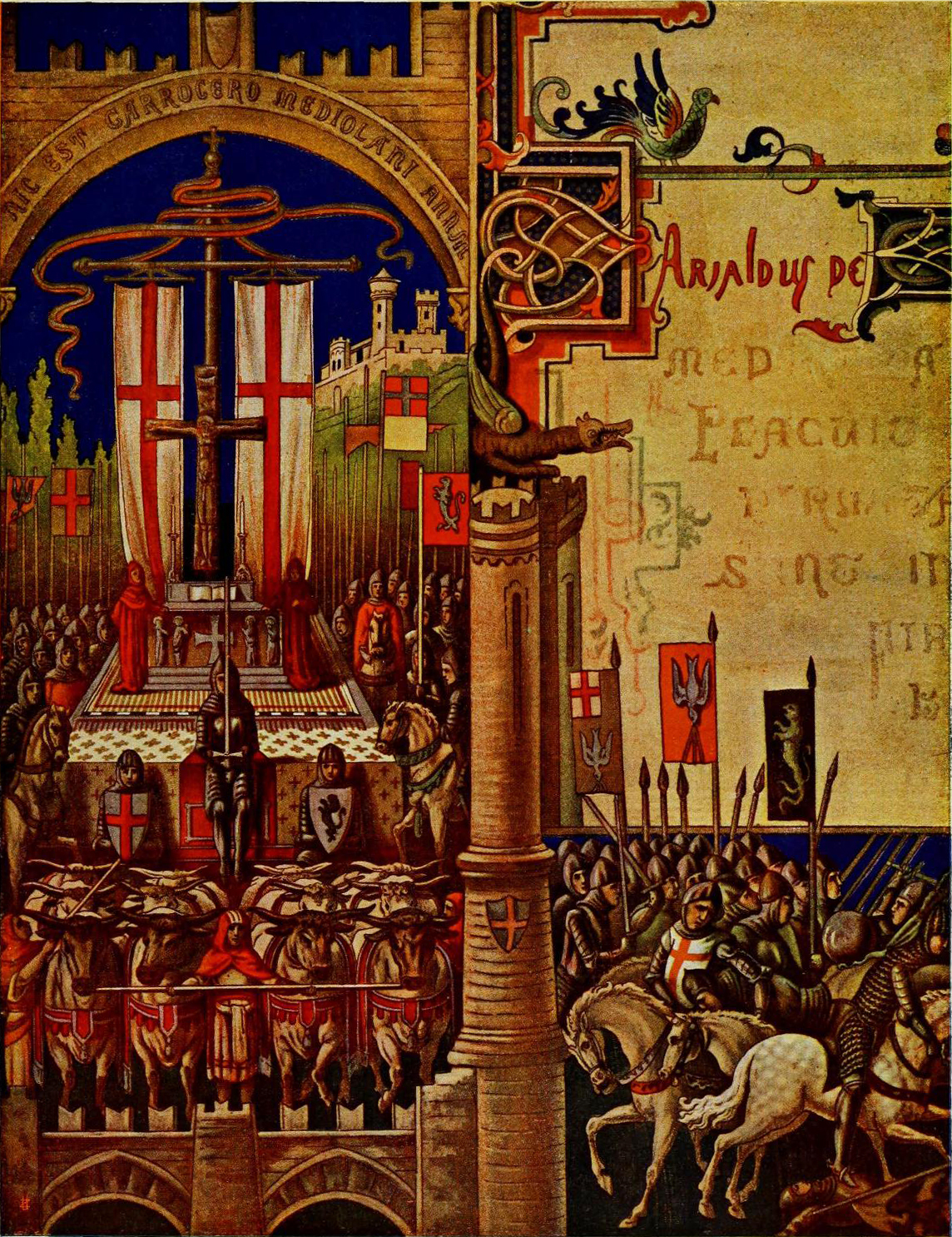
The Carroccio of Milan on an ancient miniature

Aribert was born between 970 and 980 in Intimiano, near Cantù, to an aristocratic family of Lombard origins. On 28 March 1018, he was consecrated, bishop of Milan. Aribert went to Konstanz in June 1025, with other bishops of Northern Italy, to pay homage to Conrad II of Germany, the beleaguered founder of the Salian dynasty. There, in exchange for privileges, he agreed to crown Conrad with the Iron Crown of Lombardy, which the magnates had offered to Odo of Blois.

This he did, on 26 March 1026, at Milan, for the traditional seat of Lombard coronations, Pavia, was still in revolt against imperial authority. He journeyed to Rome a year later for the imperial coronation of Conrad by Pope John XIX on 26 March 1027; at a synod at the Lateran he negotiated a decision of the precedence of the archdiocese of Milan over that of Ravenna. He subsequently joined an imperial military expedition into the Kingdom of Arles, which Conrad inherited upon the death in 1032 of Rudolph III of Burgundy, but which was contested by Odo.

The Italian army, organised and led by Aribert and Boniface III, Margrave of Tuscany, joined Conrad's German army in Geneva. Together, they invaded the kingdom of Burgundy. Alarmed by the size of the combined forces, Odo fled without engaging in battle, enabling Conrad to annex Burgundy to the Empire. This was the greatest achievement of Conrad's reign, and Aribert played a pivotal role in ensuring this outcome.

In the political arena of Italy, power was disputed between the great territorial magnates – the capitanei – with their vassal captains and the lesser nobility – the valvassores – allied with the burghers of the Italian communes. Aribert created enemies among the lower nobility, against whom he perpetrated the worst acts of violence, and with the metropolitan of Ravenna, whose episcopal rights, along with those of the smaller sees, he ignored. A revolt soon engulfed northern Italy and, at Aribert's request, Conrad's son, the Emperor Henry III, travelled south of the Alps in the winter of 1036/37, to quell it. The Emperor, however, took the position of champion of the valvassores and demanded that Aribert should make a defence against charges brought against him, but Aribert refused, on the grounds that he was the emperor's equal.

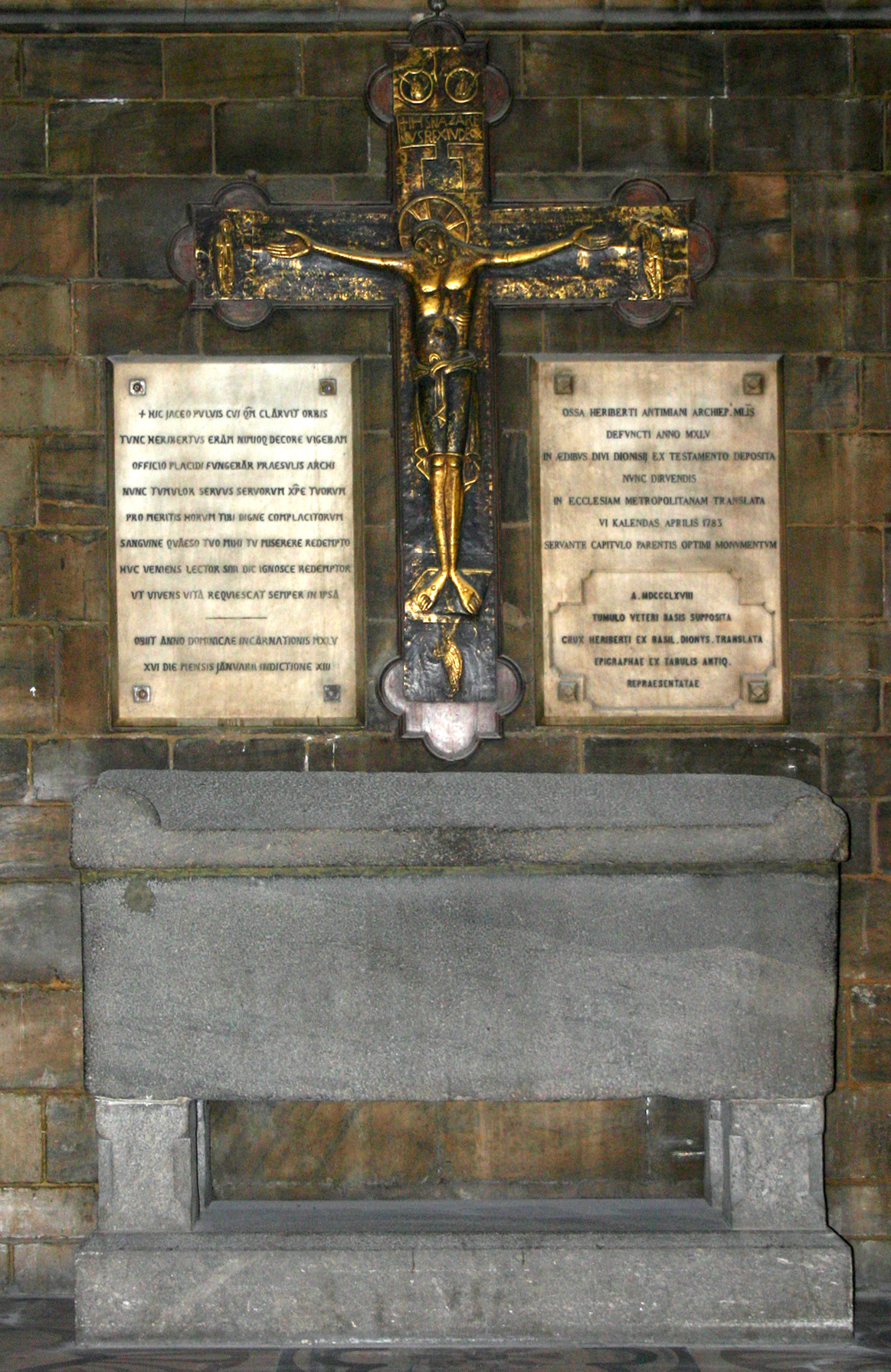
The tomb of Aribert in Milan Cathedral, with a copy of the Cross of Aribert

Deeming his actions treasonous, Conrad resorted to the drastic action of arresting Aribert, placing him in the custody of Poppo of Treffen, Patriarch of Aquileia, and Conrad II, Duke of Carinthia. Aribert's arrest provoked the rebellion of the anti-Imperial faction of the Milanese, seen by 19th-century historians as fiercely patriotic. Aribert had soon escaped his imprisonment and was leading the revolt from Milan. The Emperor found himself unable to take Milan by siege and proceeded to Rome, where his diplomatic skills succeeded in isolating Aribert from his erstwhile allies, notably through his famous decree of 28 May 1037, securing the tenancy of lesser vassals, both imperial and ecclesiastical.

The Emperor took the step of deposing the fighting archbishop, and John's successor Pope Benedict IX excommunicated Aribert in March 1038. That year, he held up the Carroccio as the symbol of Milan and soon it was the symbol of all the Tuscan cities as far as Rome. Aribert ended his episcopacy in relative peace, having agreed to cease hostilities with Henry, at Ingelheim in 1040, reconciled with him and obtained the revocation of his excommunication. He died on 16 January 1045 and was buried in the Basilica of San Dionigi. His sarcophagus was moved to Milan Cathedral after the demolition of San Dionigi in the late 18th century.

== The cross of Aribert ==
The tomb of Aribert is located in the first span of the right aisle of Milan Cathedral. The archbishop's sarcophagus is surmounted by a copy of the famous crucifix in gilded copper foil (the original is located in the museum of Milan Cathedral) originally donated by Aribert to the monastery of San Dionigi, a convent which was later demolished in 1783.

A reproduction of the cross of Aribert is also one of the symbols of victory at the Palio di Legnano. The historical re-enactment takes place every year on the last Sunday of May and concludes with a horse race between the eight contrade Legnanesi: the contrada winner of the competition exposes the cross for a whole year in its own church of reference until the next edition of the prize.
