= Monte Barro =

Mountain in Italy

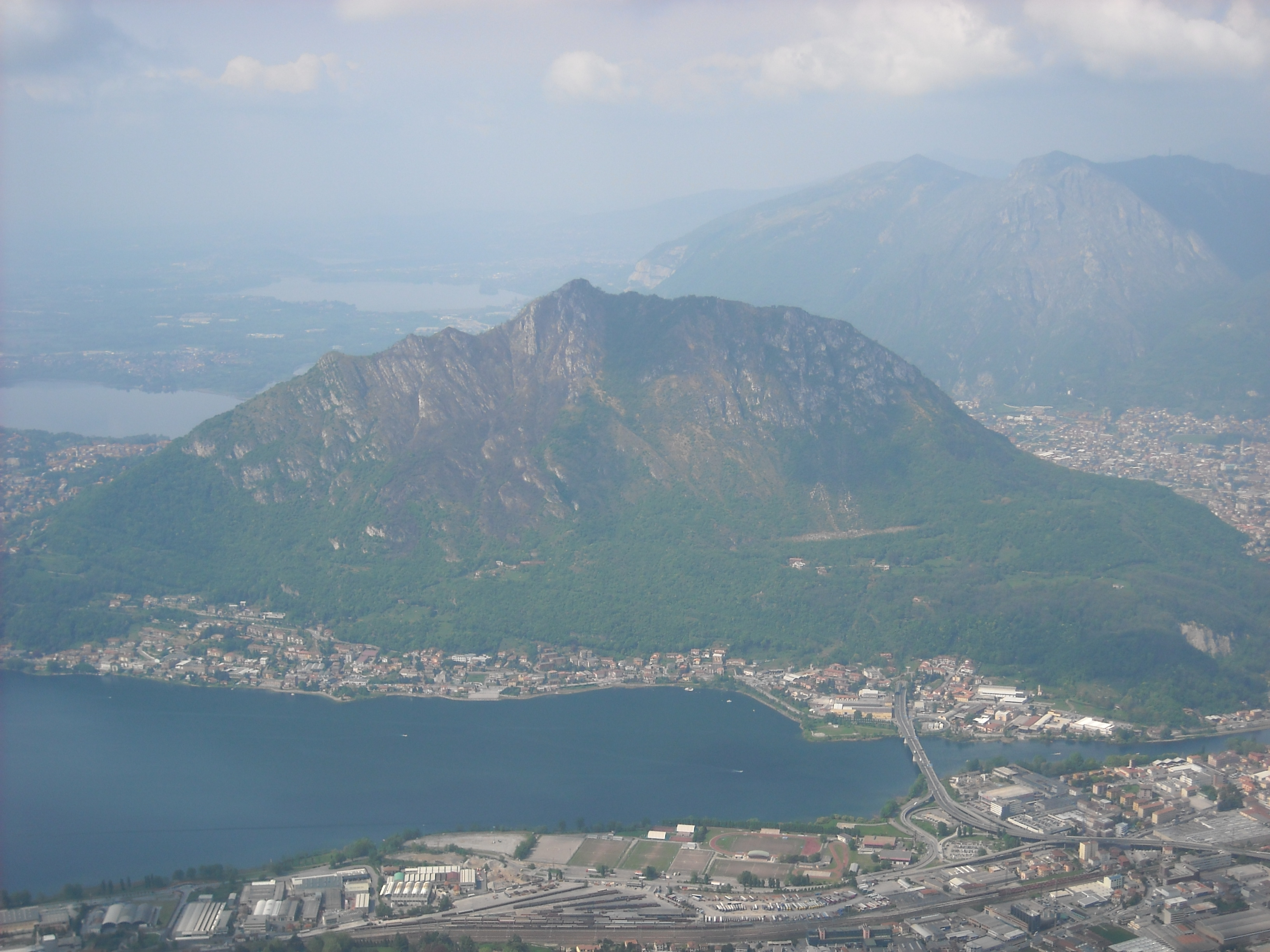
- Monte Barro

Highest point
- Elevation: 922 m (3,025 ft)
- Prominence: 657 m (2,156 ft)
- Coordinates: 45°49′57″N 9°22′45″E

Geography
- Location within Alps
- Location: Lombardy, Italy
- Parent range: Lugano Prealps

Monte Barro is a mountain of Lombardy, Italy, It has an elevation of 922 metres (3,025 ft).

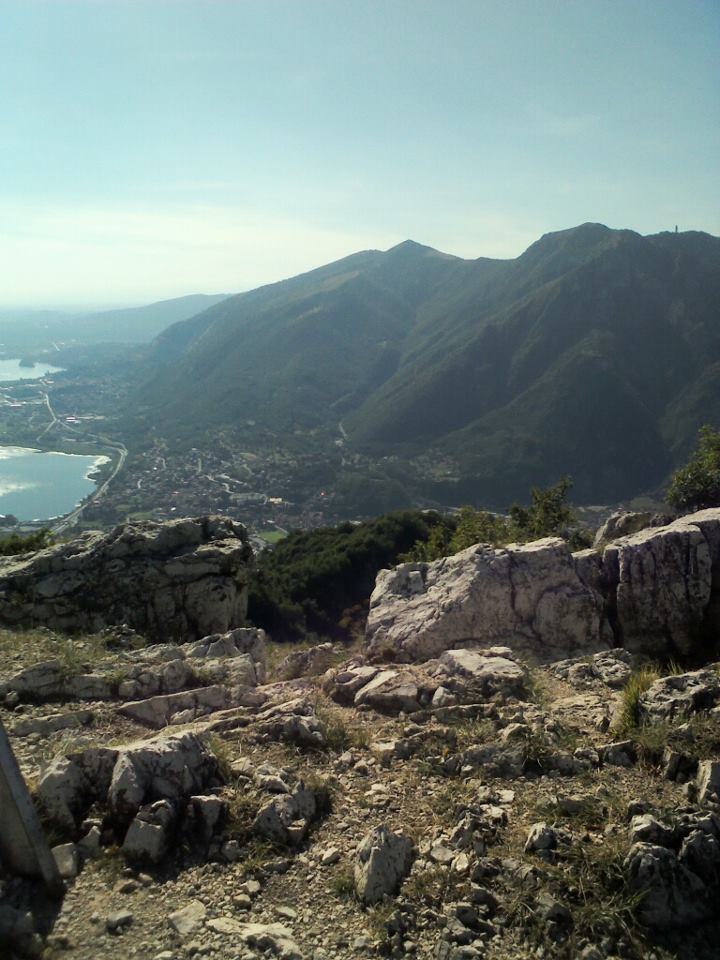
View from the summit
