= Capiago Intimiano =

Capiago Intimiano Capiagh e Intimian (Lombard)
- Comune
- Comune di Capiago Intimiano
- Location within Italy Location within Lombardy
- Coordinates: 45°46′N 9°7′E
- Country: Italy
- Region: Lombardy
- Province: Province of Como (CO)
- Frazioni: Olmeda

Area
  - Total: 5.7 km^{2} (2.2 sq mi)
- Elevation: 410 m (1,350 ft)

Population (Dec. 2004)
  - Total: 5,196
  - Density: 910/km^{2} (2,400/sq mi)
- Demonym: Capiaghesi – Intimianesi
- Time zone: UTC+1 (CET)
  - Summer (DST): UTC+2 (CEST)
- Postal code: 22070
- Dialing code: 031

Capiago Intimiano (Comasco: Capiagh e Intimian [kaˈpjaːk e ĩtiˈmjãː]) is a comune (municipality) in the Province of Como in the Italian region Lombardy, located about 35 kilometres (22 mi) north of Milan and about 6 kilometres (4 mi) southeast of Como. As of 31 December 2004, it had a population of 5,196 and an area of 5.7 square kilometres (2.2 mi^{2}).

Capiago observes the Roman Rite while Intimiano observes the Ambrosian Rite.

The municipality of Capiago Intimiano contains the frazioni (subdivisions, mainly villages and hamlets) of Olmeda.

Capiago Intimiano borders the following municipalities: Cantù, Como, Lipomo, Montorfano, Orsenigo, Senna Comasco.

== Demographic evolution ==
Historical population

Year	Pop.	±%
1861	1,283	—
1871	1,294	+0.9%
1881	1,400	+8.2%
1901	1,685	+20.4%
1911	1,641	−2.6%

Year	Pop.	±%
1921	1,704	+3.8%
1931	1,950	+14.4%
1936	1,956	+0.3%
1951	2,367	+21.0%
1961	2,844	+20.2%

Year	Pop.	±%
1971	3,694	+29.9%
1981	4,262	+15.4%
1991	4,485	+5.2%
2001	4,839	+7.9%

Source: Data from ISTAT

== Twin towns ==
Capiago Intimiano is twinned with:

- Buják, Hungary
