= Cantù =

Cantù Cantuu (Lombard)
- Comune
- Comune di Cantù
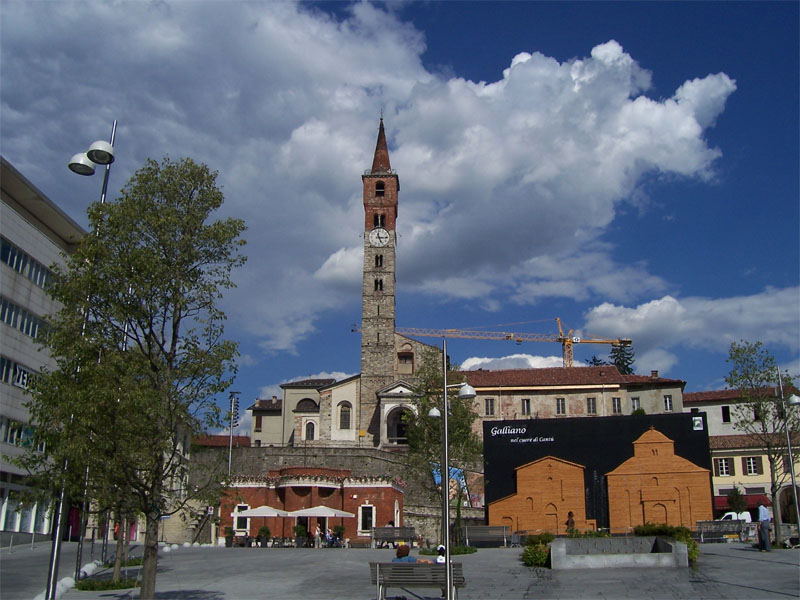

- Coat of arms

- Location within Italy Location within Lombardy
- Coordinates: 45°44′N 09°08′E
- Country: Italy
- Region: Lombardy
- Province: Como (CO)
- Frazioni: Vighizzolo, Fecchio, Mirabello, Cascina Amata, Asnago

Government
  - Mayor: Alice Galbiati

Area
  - Total: 23 km^{2} (8.9 sq mi)
- Elevation: 370 m (1,210 ft)

Population (31 March 2017)
  - Total: 39,917
  - Density: 1,700/km^{2} (4,500/sq mi)
- Demonym: Canturini
- Time zone: UTC+1 (CET)
  - Summer (DST): UTC+2 (CEST)
- Postal code: 22063
- Dialing code: 031
- Patron saint: Saint Apollonia
- Saint day: February 9
- Website: Official website

Cantù (Italian pronunciation: [kanˈtu]; Brianzöö: Cantuu [kãˈtyː]) is a city and comune in the Province of Como, located at the center of the Brianza zone in Lombardy. It is the second largest city in Brianza.

== History ==
The name could stem from that of the Canturigi, a population of Insubria of the 6th century BC. A village was founded here by Gauls in the following century, which was conquered by the Romans in 196 BC.

In the Middle Ages Cantù was a source of conflict between the cities of Milan and Como. The Sforza of Milan took control permanently in the 15th century.

== Main sights ==
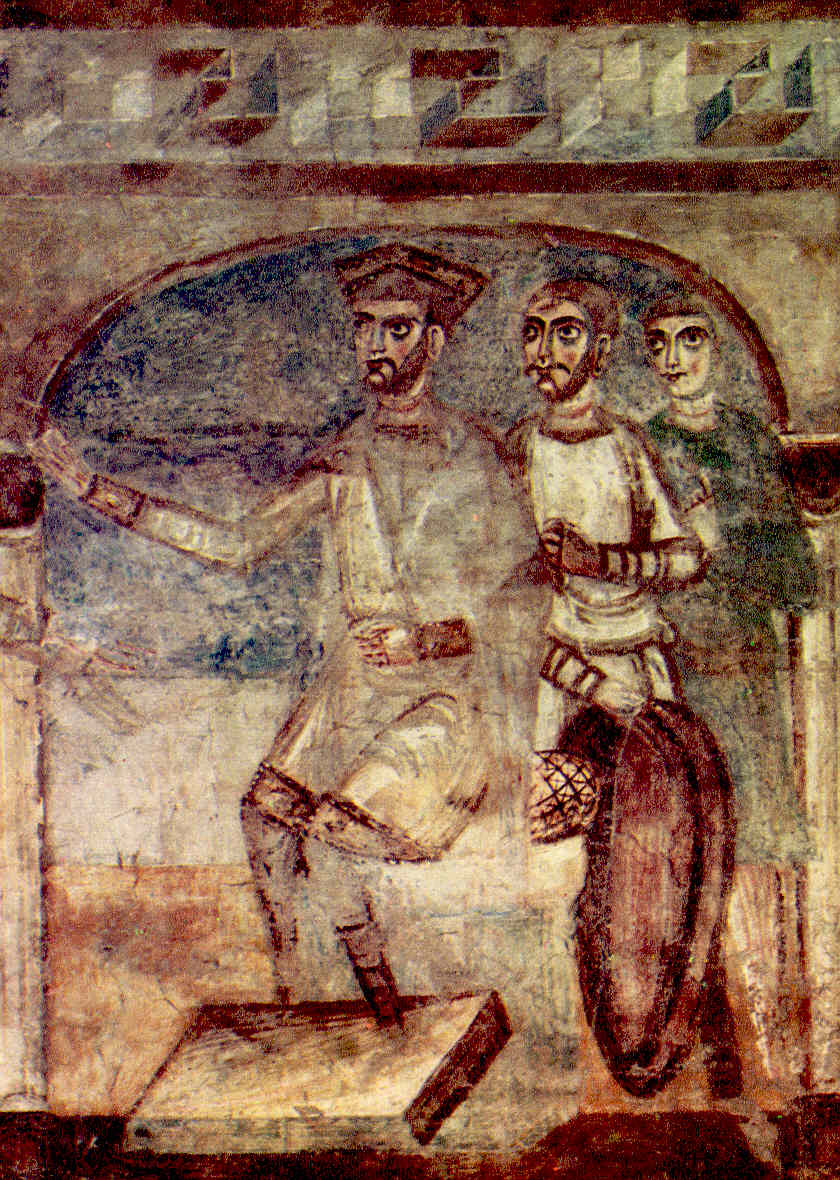
Detail from the life of St Christopher (c.1000), from the nave of the Basilica of Galliano.

The main attraction of Cantù is the Basilica di San Vincenzo in the frazione Galliano, which was consecrated in 1007 by the future Archbishop of Milan, Ariberto da Intimiano. The building was sold in 1801 to become a private dwelling, before being bought by the municipality in 1909 and reconsecrated in 1934. The basilica contains the oldest frescoes in Lombardy consisting of series of stories from the Bible and the saints. The frescoes in the apse are especially fine, and those in the nave probably by this master painter's followers. Other sights are the Piazza Garibaldi, named for Giuseppe Garibaldi, and the San Paolo Church, whose bell tower is one of the symbols of the city.

== Sport ==
Pallacanestro Cantù, the basketball club of the city, won the European Champions Cup twice in 1982 and 1983.

== Twin towns ==
- Villefranche-sur-Saône, France
- Dumfries, Scotland
- Jamestown, New York, United States

== Transportation ==
Cantù is served by Cantù railway station and Cantù-Cermenate railway station.
