= Montorfano =

Montorfano Muntorfan (Lombard)
- Comune
- Comune di Montorfano
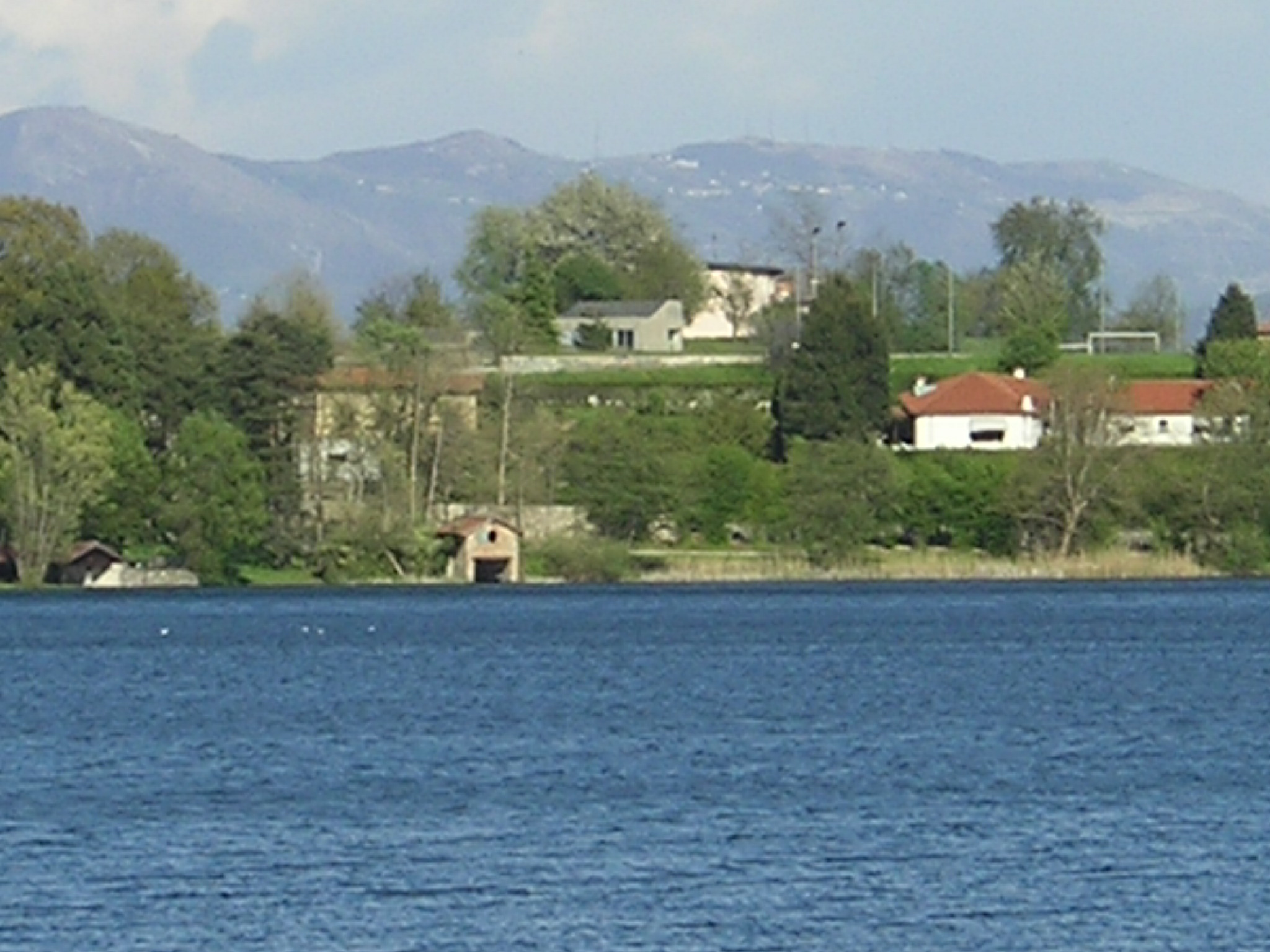

- Location within Italy Location within Lombardy
- Coordinates: 45°47′N 9°9′E
- Country: Italy
- Region: Lombardy
- Province: Como (CO)

Government
  - Mayor: Giuliano Capuano

Area
  - Total: 3.52 km^{2} (1.36 sq mi)
- Elevation: 414 m (1,358 ft)

Population (2024)
  - Total: 2,535
  - Density: 720/km^{2} (1,870/sq mi)
- Demonym: Montorfanesi
- Time zone: UTC+1 (CET)
  - Summer (DST): UTC+2 (CEST)
- Postal code: 22030
- Dialing code: 031
- Website: Official website

Montorfano (English: "orphan hill"; Brianzöö: Muntorfan [mũˈtɔrfã]) is a town and comune in the province of Como, part of Lombardy, in northern Italy. It is situated about 5 kilometres (3 mi) south of Como, which is at the southern tip of Lake Como, c. 40 kilometres (25 mi) north of Milan. It has about 2,500 inhabitants. The main attractions of Montorfano are its own very small lake and the Circolo Golf Villa d'Este, one of the main Italian golf courses which has hosted twelve Italian Opens.
