= List of Burgundian royal consorts =

Royal consorts of Burgundy

This article lists queens, countesses, and duchesses consort of the Kingdom, County, Duchy of Burgundy.

== Queen consort of Burgundy ==
=== Queen consort of the Burgundians (till 534) ===
Picture	Name	Father	Birth	Marriage	Became Queen	Ceased to be Queen	Death	Spouse
	Grimhild	?	She is a mythological queen mentioned in the Nibelungenlied who was a witch, who cast a spell on Sigurd making him leave his wife, Brynhildr, for Gudrun.					Gebicca
	Dietlind of Bechelaren	Rüdiger, Count of Bechelaren	She is a mythological queen mentioned in the Nibelungenlied as being married to Giselher.					Giselher
	Brynhildr the Valkyrie	King Budli	She is a mythological queen, a valkyrie, based on the stories of the Völsunga saga and some Eddic poems treating the same events. Under the name Brünnhilde she appears in the Nibelungenlied. Brynhildr is probably inspired by the Visigothic princess Brunhilda of Austrasia, who married Merovingian king Sigebert I in 567. The history of Brynhildr includes fratricide, a long battle between brothers, and dealings with the Huns.					Gunther
	Sister of Ricimer	Rechila, Suevic King of Galicia	?	?	?	472		Gondioc
	Caretena	?	?	?	?	493		Chilperic II
	Ostrogotho of the Ostrogoths	Theodoric the Great (Bosonid)	475	494 or 496	516 husband's accession	520		Sigismund

=== Frankish Burgundy (534–855) ===
==== Merovingian dynasty (534–751) ====
Queen consort of Burgundy/Orléans, 561–613
Picture	Name	Father	Birth	Marriage	Became Queen	Ceased to be Queen	Death	Spouse
	Vénérande	a slave	?	?	?	?	?	Guntram
	Marcatrude	Magnar (Magnacaire d'Outre-Jura)	?	565?		566?		Guntram
	Austerchild	?	?	567		after 580		Guntram
	Faileube	?	?	?	?	?	?	Childebert II
	Ermenberga of the Visigoths	Witteric, King of the Visigoths	?	606		607 repudiated	?	Theuderic II
United to Austrasia in 612 and passed Neustria in 613.
Queen of Neustria, Paris, Burgundy and Austrasia, 613–629
Picture	Name	Father	Birth	Marriage	Became Queen	Ceased to be Queen	Death	Spouse
	Bertrude of Vermandois	Wagon II, Count of Vermandois	582	?613?		618/619		Chlothar II
	Sichilde	?	c. 590	618		18 October 629 husband's death	ap. 627	Chlothar II
Queen of Neustria and Burgundy, 629–691
Picture	Name	Father	Birth	Marriage	Became Queen	Ceased to be Queen	Death	Spouse
	Gomentrude	?	598	628		629 répudiée	after 630	Dagobert I
	Nanthild the Saxon	?	c. 610	c. 629		19 January 639 husband's death	642	Dagobert I
	Ragintrudis	?	610?	?	?	?	?	Dagobert I
	Wulfefundis	?	?	?	?	?	?	Dagobert I
	Bertechildis	?	?	?	?	?	?	Dagobert I
	Balthild	Anglo-Saxon aristocrat	626 or 627	649		27 November 655 or 658 husband's death	30 January 680	Clovis II
	Amatilda	?	?	?	?	?	?	Chlothar III
	Bilichild of Austrasia	Sigebert III of Austrasia	654	668	673 invasion of Neustria and Burgundy	675		Childeric II
	Clotilda of Heristal	Ansegisel	650	before 680		679; Became Queen of All the Franks	699	Theuderic III
United with Austrasia to form a single Frankish state
Queen of Neustria, Burgundy, Aquitaine, and Austrasia
	Edonne	Most likely this a fabricated name of the wife of Childebert III and mother of Dagobert III whose name is unknown.						Childebert III
No Merovingian or Burgundian queens have been recorded beyond the obscure Edonne.

==== Carolingian dynasty (751–855) ====
Frankish Queen consort of Burgundy, 751–843
Picture	Name	Father	Birth	Marriage	Became Queen	Ceased to be Queen	Death	Spouse
	Bertrada of Laon	Charibert, Count of Laon	710/27	740	November 751 as sole-Queen consort of the Franks	24 September 768 husband's death	12 July 783	Pepin I
	Gerberga	?	?	?	24 September 768 as co-Queen consort of the Franks	4 December 771 husband's death	?	Carloman I
	Gerperga of the Lombards	Desiderius, King of the Lombards	?	770 as co-Queen consort of the Franks		771 repuditated	?	Charles I
	Hildegard	Gerold of Vinzgouw (Agilolfings)	758	771 as sole-Queen consort of the Franks; 774 as Queen consort the Lombards; 781 as co-Queen consort the Lombards		30 April 783		Charles I
	Fastrada of Franconia	Raoul III of Franconia	765	784 as sole-Queen consort of the Franks and co-Queen consort the Lombards		10 October 794		Charles I
	Luitgard of Sundgau	Luitfrid II, Count of Sundgau (Etichonids)	776	794 as sole-Queen consort of the Franks and co-Queen consort the Lombards		4 June 800		Charles I
	Ermengarde of Hesbaye	Ingerman, Count of Hesbaye (Robertians)	778	794/5	813 as Holy Roman Empress and Queen consort of the Franks 817 as senior Holy Roman Empress	3 October 818		Louis I
	Judith of Bavaria	Welf I, Count of Altdorf(Elder Welfs)	805	819 as senior Holy Roman Empress and Queen consort of the Franks		20 June 840 husband's death	19/23 April 843	Louis I
After the Treaty of Verdun
Picture	Name	Father	Birth	Marriage	Became Queen	Ceased to be Queen	Death	Spouse
	Ermengarde of Tours	Hugh of Tours (Etichonids)	800/4	15 October 821		20 March 851		Lothair I

After Lothar's death in 855, his realm was divided between his sons. The Burgundian territories were divided between:

- Lothair II, who received the northern parts (Upper Burgundy).
- Charles, who received the southern parts including Provence, Lyon and Vienne. His realm was called the regnum provinciae (kingdom of Provence) or Lower Burgundy.

=== Lower Burgundy (855–863) ===
After the division of the Carolingian Empire by the Treaty of Verdun (843), the first of the fraternal rulers of the three kingdoms to die was Lothair I, who divided his middle kingdom in accordance with the custom of the Franks between his three sons. Out of this division came the Kingdom of Provence, given to Lothair's youngest son, Charles. A heritage of royal rule was thus inaugurated in Provence that, though it was often subsumed into one of its larger neighbouring kingdoms, it was just as often proclaiming its own sovereigns.

==== Carolingian dynasty (855–879) ====
Picture	Name	Father	Birth	Marriage	Became Queen	Ceased to be Queen	Death	Spouse
	Engelberga of Parma	Adelchis I, Count of Parma (Supponids)	830	5 October 851	24 January 863 husband's accession	12 August 875 husband's death	896-901	Louis II
	Richilde of Provence	Bivin of Gorze, Count of the Ardennes (Bosonid)	845	870	12 August 875 husband's ascession	6 October 877 husband's death	2 June 910	Charles III
	Adelaide of Paris	Adalard of Paris (Girardids)	850/853	February 875	6 October 877 husband's accession	10 April 879 husband's death	10 November 901	Louis III

==== Bosonid dynasty (879–933) ====
Picture	Name	Father	Birth	Marriage	Became Queen	Ceased to be Queen	Death	Spouse
	Ermengard of Italy	Louis II (Carolingian)	835/852/855	June 876	10 April 879 husband's accession	11 January 887 husband's death	22 June 896	Boso I
	Anna of Constantinople	Leo VI the Wise (Macedonian)	888	around 900		912		Louis IV
	Adelaide	Rudolph I (Elder Welf)	-	914		28 June 928 husband's death	943	Louis IV
	Alda (or Hilda)	?	?	after 924	5 June 928 husband's accession	before 932 marriage annulled	?	Hugh I
	Marozia of Tusculum, Senatrix and Patricia of Rome	Theophylact I, Count of Tusculum (Tusculani)	890	932		December 932; 933; Provence ceases to be a separate kingdom.	932/937	Hugh I

In 933, Provence ceases to be a separate kingdom as Hugh exchanged it with Rudolph II of Upper Burgundy for the throne of Northern Italy.

==== Welf dynasty (888–1032) ====
Picture	Name	Father	Birth	Marriage	Became Queen	Ceased to be Queen	Death	Spouse
	Bertha of Swabia	Burchard II, Duke of Swabia (Hunfridings)	907	922	933 husband's accession	11 July 937 husband's death	after 2 January 966	Rudolph I
	Adelane	-	935/40	950s?		23 March 963/4		Conrad I
	Matilda of France	Louis IV of France (Carolingian)	943	964		26/27 January 981/2		Conrad I
	Aldiud	-	-	after 981/2		19 October 993 husband's death	-	Conrad I
	Agaltrudis	-	-	before 12 January 994		21 March 1008 or 18 February 1011		Rudolph II
	Ermengarde of Savoy	Humbert I, Count of Savoy (Savoy)	-	24 April/28 July 1011		6 September 1032 husband's death	25/27 August 1057	Rudolph II

In 1032 the kingdom of Upper and Lower Burgundy was incorporated into the Holy Roman Empire as a third kingdom, the Kingdom of Burgundy (later known as Kingdom of Arles), with the King of Germany or Emperor as King of Burgundy.

=== Upper Burgundy (855–1032) ===
==== Carolingian dynasty (855–888) ====
Lothair II subsumed his portion of Burgundy into the Kingdom of Lotharingia and at his brother Charles' death, gained some northern districts of the deceased's kingdom. When Lothair II died in 869, his realm was divided between his uncles Charles the Bald and Louis the German in the Treaty of Meerssen.

When Emperor Charles the Fat, who until 884 had reunited all Frankish kingdoms except for kingdom of Provence, died in 888, the nobles and leading clergy of Upper Burgundy assembled at St Maurice and elected Rudolph, count of Auxerre, from the Elder House of Welf, as king. At first, he tried to reunite the realm of Lothair II, but opposition by Arnulf of Carinthia forced him to focus on his Burgundian territory.

Picture	Name	Father	Birth	Marriage	Became Queen	Ceased to be Queen	Death	Spouse
	Teutberga	Boso the Elder (Bosonids)	-	855	29 September 855 as Queen of Lotharingia	8 August 869 husband's death	before 25 November 875	Lothair II
Lothair II's empire divided between his uncles in the Treaty of Meerssen. (869-888)
	Ermentrude of Orléans	Odo I, Count of Orléans (Orléans)	-	855	8 August 869 as Queen of West Franks	6 October 869		Charles the Bald
	Richilde of Provence	Bivin of Gorze (Bosonids)	-	870 as Queen of West Franks, Queen of Italy, and Holy Roman Empress		6 October 877 husband's death	2 June 910	Charles the Bald
	Adelaide of Paris	Adalard of Paris (Paris)	-	February 875	6 October 877 as Queen of West Franks	10 April 879 husband's death	10 November 901	Louis the Stammerer
	Emma of Altdorf	Welf (Welf)	-	827	8 August 869 as Queen of East Franks	31 January 876		Louis the German
	Liutgard of Saxony	Liudolf, Duke of Saxony (Liudolfing)	840/50	29 November 874	28 August 876 as Queen of Saxony, Bavaria, and East Franks	20 January 882 husband's death	17 November 885	Louis the Younger
	Richardis of Swabia	Erchanger of Nordgau	-	862	20 January 882 as Holy Roman Empress, and Queen of East and West Franks	13 January 888 husband's death	18 September 894/6	Charles the Fat

==== Welf dynasty (888–1032) ====
Picture	Name	Father	Birth	Marriage	Became Queen	Ceased to be Queen	Death	Spouse
	Guilla of Provence	Boso of Provence (Bosonids)	873	885/888	888 husband's accession	25 October 911 husband's death	912-924	Rudolph I
	Bertha of Swabia	Burchard II, Duke of Swabia (Hunfridings)	907	922		11 July 937 husband's death	after 2 January 966	Rudolph II
	Adelane	-	935/40	950s?		23 March 963/4		Conrad I
	Matilda of France	Louis IV of France (Carolingian)	943	964		26/27 January 981/2		Conrad I
	Aldiud	-	-	after 981/2		19 October 993 husband's death	-	Conrad I
	Agaltrudis	-	-	before 12 January 994		21 March 1008 or 18 February 1011		Rudolph II
	Ermengarde of Savoy	Humbert I, Count of Savoy (Savoy)	-	24 April/28 July 1011		6 September 1032 husband's death	25/27 August 1057	Rudolph II

In 1032 the kingdom of Upper and Lower Burgundy was incorporated into the Holy Roman Empire as a third kingdom, the Kingdom of Burgundy (later known as the Kingdom of Arles), with the King of Germany or Emperor as King of Burgundy.

=== Holy Roman Empress, Queen consort of the Kingdom of Burgundy (1032–1378) ===
==== Salian dynasty (1032–1125) ====
Picture	Name	Father	Birth	Marriage	Became Queen	Became Empress	Ceased to be Consort	Death	Spouse
	Gisela of Swabia	Herman II, Duke of Swabia (Conradines)	11 November 995	1016	6 September 1032 husband's accession	26 March 1027	4 June 1039 husband's death	14 February 1043	Conrad II
	Agnes de Poitou	William V, Duke of Aquitaine (Ramnulfids)	1025	21 November 1043		25 December 1046	5 October 1056 husband's death	14 December 1077	Henry III
Bertha of Savoy, the Holy Roman Empress	Bertha of Savoy	Otto, Count of Savoy (Savoy)	21 September 1051	13 July 1066		21 March 1084	27 December 1087		Henry IV
	Eupraxia of Kiev	Vsevolod I, Grand Prince of Kiev (Rurikids)	1071	14 August 1089		14 August 1089	31 December 1105 husband's deposition	20 July 1109	Henry IV
	Matilda of England	Henry I of England (Normandy)	7 February 1101	7 January 1114			23 May 1125 husband's death	10 September 1167	Henry V

==== Supplinburger dynasty (1125–1137) ====
Picture	Name	Father	Birth	Marriage	Became Queen	Became Empress	Ceased to be Consort	Death	Spouse
	Richenza of Northeim	Henry, Margrave of Frisia (Northeim)	1087/89	1100	30 August 1125 husband's accession	4 June 1133	4 December 1137 husband's death	10 June 1141	Lothair III

==== Hohenstaufen dynasty (1138–1208) ====
Picture	Name	Father	Birth	Marriage	Became Queen	Became Empress	Ceased to be Consort	Death	Spouse
	Gertrude of Sulzbach	Berengar II, Count of Sulzbach (Sulzbach)	1114	1136	7 March 1138 husband's accession (in opposition)	never Empress	14 April 1146		Conrad III
	Adelheid of Vohburg	Diepold III, Margrave of Vohburg (Vohburg)	1128	1147	4 March 1152 husband's accession	never Empress	March 1153 marriage annulled	after 1187	Frederick I
	Beatrice I, Countess of Burgundy	Renaud III, Count of Burgundy (Ivrea)	1148	9 June 1156			15 November 1184		Frederick I
	Constance of Sicily	Roger II of Sicily (Hauteville)	2 November 1154	27 January 1186	10 June 1190 husband's accession	14 April 1191	28 September 1197 husband's death	27 November 1198	Henry VI
	Irene Angelina	Isaac II Angelos (Angelos)	1177/1181	25 May 1197	6 March 1198 husband's accession	never Empress	27 August 1208		Philip of Swabia

==== Welf dynasty (1208–1215) ====
Picture	Name	Father	Birth	Marriage	Became Queen	Became Empress	Ceased to be Consort	Death	Spouse
	Beatrice of Swabia	Philip (Hohenstaufen)	April/June 1198	23 July 1212			11 August 1212		Otto IV
	Marie of Brabant	Henry I, Duke of Brabant (Leuven)	1190	after 19 May 1214			5 July 1215 husband's deposition	9 March/14 June 1260	Otto IV

==== Hohenstaufen dynasty (1212–1254) ====
Picture	Name	Father	Birth	Marriage	Became Queen	Became Empress	Ceased to be Consort	Death	Spouse
	Constance of Aragon	Alfonso II of Aragón (Barcelona)	1179	5 August 1209	9 December 1212 husband's accession	22 November 1220	23 June 1222		Frederick II
	Isabella II of Jerusalem	John of Brienne, King of Jerusalem (Brienne)	1212	9 November 1225			25 April 1228		Frederick II
	Isabella of England	John of England (Plantagenet)	1214	15/20 July 1235			1 December 1241		Frederick II
	Bianca Lancia	A child of Manfred I Lancia (Aleramici–Lancia)	c. 1200	c. 1244? Evidence for marriage is dubious			c. 1244		Frederick II
	Margaret of Babenberg	Leopold VI, Duke of Austria (Babenberg)	1204	29 November 1225	23 March 1227	never Empress	4 July 1235 husband dethroned; 12 February 1242 husband's death	29 October 1266	Henry (VII)
	Elisabeth of Bavaria	Otto II, Duke of Bavaria (Wittelsbach)	1227	1 September 1246		never Empress	21 May 1254 husband's death	9 October 1273	Conrad IV

==== House of Habsburg (1273–1291) ====
Picture	Name	Father	Birth	Marriage	Became Queen	Became Empress	Ceased to be Consort	Death	Spouse
	Gertrude of Hohenberg	Burchard V, Count of Hohenberg	1225	1245	29 September 1273	never Empress	16 February 1281		Rudolf I
	Isabelle of Burgundy	Hugh IV, Duke of Burgundy	c. 1270	6 February 1284		never Empress	15 July 1291 husband's death	c. 1323	Rudolf I

==== House of Nassau (1292–1298) ====
Picture	Name	Father	Birth	Marriage	Became Queen	Became Empress	Ceased to be Consort	Death	Spouse
	Imagina of Isenburg-Limburg	Gerlach IV of Isenburg-Limburg (Isenburg-Limburg)	1259	1271	5 May 1292	never Empress	23 June 1298	29 September 1313	Adolph I

==== House of Habsburg (1298–1308) ====
Picture	Name	Father	Birth	Marriage	Became Queen	Became Empress	Ceased to be Consort	Death	Spouse
	Elisabeth of Tirol	Meinhard, Duke of Carinthia	c. 1262	20 December 1274	27 July 1298	never Empress	1 May 1308	28 October 1312	Albert I

==== House of Luxembourg (1308–1313) ====
Picture	Name	Father	Birth	Marriage	Became Queen	Became Empress	Ceased to be Consort	Death	Spouse
	Margaret of Brabant	John I, Duke of Brabant (Leuven)	4 October 1276	9 July 1292	27 November 1308 husband's accession	never Empress	14 December 1311		Henry VII

==== House of Habsburg (1314–1322) ====
Picture	Name	Father	Birth	Marriage	Became Queen	Became Empress	Ceased to be Consort	Death	Spouse
	Isabella of Aragon	James II of Aragon (Barcelona)	1305	11 May 1315	19 October 1315 husband's election (in opposition)/ 5 September 1325 husband recognised as co-King	never Empress	28 September 1322 husband abandons claim/ 13 January 1330 husband's death	12 July 1330	Frederick the Handsome

==== House of Wittelsbach (1314–1347) ====
Picture	Name	Father	Birth	Marriage	Became Queen	Became Empress	Ceased to be Consort	Death	Spouse
	Beatrix of Świdnica	Bolko I, Duke of Świdnica	1290	1308	20 October 1314 husband's election	never Empress	24 August 1322		Louis IV
	Margaret, Countess of Hainaut	William of Avesnes, Count of Hainaut	1311	26 February 1324		January 1328	11 October 1347	23 June 1356	Louis IV

==== House of Luxembourg (1346–1378) ====
Picture	Name	Father	Birth	Marriage	Became Queen	Became Empress	Ceased to be Consort	Death	Spouse
	Blanche of Valois	Charles of Valois	1316	May 1329	11 July 1346 husband's election (in opposition)	never Empress	1 August 1348		Charles IV, Holy Roman Emperor
	Anne of Bavaria	Rudolf II, Duke of Bavaria (Wittelsbach)	26 September 1329	4 March 1349	17 June 1349 husband's election (without opposition)	never Empress	2 February 1353		Charles IV, Holy Roman Emperor
	Anna of Świdnica	Henry II, Duke of Świdnica	c. 1339	27 May 1353		5 April 1355 coronation with husband	11 July 1362		Charles IV, Holy Roman Emperor
	Elizabeth of Pomerania	Bogislaw V, Duke of Pomerania	1347	21 May 1363		1 November 1368 coronation	29 November 1378 husband's death	14 February 1393	Charles IV, Holy Roman Emperor
	Joanna of Bavaria	Albert I, Duke of Bavaria (Wittelsbach)	c. 1362	29 September 1370	10 June 1376	never Empress	31 December 1386		Wenceslaus, King of the Romans
	Sophia of Bavaria	John II, Duke of Bavaria (Wittelsbach)	1376	2 May 1389		never Empress	20 August 1400 husband's deposition	26 September 1425	Wenceslaus, King of the Romans
In 1378, Charles IV appointed the Dauphin of France as the permanent Imperial vicar of the Kingdom of Arles. The kingdom was only notional by then.

== Countess consort of Burgundy ==
=== House of Ivrea (995–1190) ===
Image	Name	Father	Born	Married	Became Countess	Ceased to be Countess	Died	Spouse
	Ermentrude of Roucy	Renaud of Roucy	?	982	995 husband's accession	5 March 1002/1005		Otto-William, Count of Burgundy
	Adelaide-Blanche of Anjou		947	1016		29 May 1026		Otto-William, Count of Burgundy
	Alice of Normandy	Richard II, Duke of Normandy	?	1 September 1016	21 September 1026 husband's accession	7/27 July 1037		Renaud I
	Stephanie		?	1049/1057	3 September 1057 husband's accession	12 November 1087 husband's death	after 1088	William I
	Regina of Oltingen	Cuno, Count of Oltingen	?	?	12 November 1087 husband's accession	1097 husband's death	after 1107	Renaud II
	Beatrice of Lorraine	Gerard, Duke of Lorraine	?	1090	12 November 1087 husband's accession	18 May 1102 husband's death	1102/17	Stephen I
	Agatha of Lorraine	Simon I, Duke of Lorraine	1164/70	1130		April 1147		Renaud III

=== House of Hohenstaufen (1190–1231) ===
Image	Name	Father	Born	Married	Became Countess	Ceased to be Countess	Died	Spouse
	Margaret of Blois	Theobald V, Count of Blois	1164/70	1190		13 January 1200 husband's death	12 July 1230	Otto I

=== House of Andechs (1231–1279) ===
Image	Name	Father	Born	Married	Became Countess	Ceased to be Countess	Died	Spouse
	Elisabeth of Tirol	Albert IV, Count of Tyrol	1220/25	1239		19 June 1248 husband's death	10 October 1256	Otto III

=== House of Ivrea (1279–1330) ===
Image	Name	Father	Born	Married	Became Countess	Ceased to be Countess	Died	Spouse
	Philippa of Bar	Theobald II, Count of Bar (Montbelliard)	1270	1263/71	8 March 1279 husband's accession	1283/90		Otto IV
	Mahaut of Artois	Robert II, Count of Artois (Artois)	1270	1291		26 March 1303 husband's death	27 November 1329	Otto IV

=== House of Burgundy (1347–1361) ===
Image	Name	Father	Born	Married	Became Countess	Ceased to be Countess	Died	Spouse
	Margaret III, Countess of Flanders	Louis II of Flanders (Dampierre)	13 April 1350	14 May 1357		21 November 1361 husband's death	16/21 March 1405	Philip III

=== House of Capet (1361–1382) ===
None

=== House of Valois-Burgundy (1405–1482) ===
Image	Name	Father	Born	Married	Became Countess	Ceased to be Countess	Died	Spouse	Arms
	Margaret of Bavaria	Albert I, Duke of Bavaria (Wittelsbach)	1363	12 April 1385	16/21 March 1405 husband's accession	10 September 1419 husband's death	23 January 1423	John I	
	Michelle of Valois	Charles VI of France (Valois)	11 January 1395	June 1409	10 September 1419 husband's accession	8 July 1422		Philip V	
	Bonne of Artois	Philip of Artois, Count of Eu (Artois)	1396	30 November 1424		17 September 1425		Philip V	
	Isabella of Portugal	John I of Portugal (Aviz)	21 February 1397	7 January 1430		15 July 1467 husband's death	17 December 1471	Philip V	
	Margaret of York	Richard Plantagenet, 3rd Duke of York (Plantagenet)	3 May 1446	9 July 1468		5 January 1477 husband's death	23 November 1503	Charles I	

=== House of Habsburg (1482–1678) ===
Image	Name	Father	Born	Married	Became Countess	Ceased to be Countess	Died	Spouse	Arms
	Joanna of Castile	Ferdinand II of Aragon (Trastámara)	6 November 1479	20 October 1496		25 September 1506 husband's death	12 April 1555	Philip VI	
	Isabella of Portugal	Manuel I of Portugal (Aviz)	24 October 1503	11 March 1526		1 May 1539		Charles I	
	Mary I of England	Henry VIII of England (Tudor)	18 February 1516	25 July 1554	16 January 1556 husband's ascension	17 November 1558		Philip VII	
	Elisabeth of Valois	Henry II of France (Valois-Angoulême)	2 April 1545	22 June 1559		3 October 1568		Philip VII	
	Anna of Austria	Maximilian II, Holy Roman Emperor (Habsburg)	1 November 1549	4 May 1570		26 October 1580		Philip VII	
	Elisabeth of Bourbon	Henry IV of France (Bourbon)	22 November 1602	25 November 1615	31 March 1621 husband's ascension	6 October 1644		Philip VIII	
	Mariana of Austria	Ferdinand III, Holy Roman Emperor (Habsburg)	24 December 1634	7 October 1649		17 September 1665 husband's death	16 May 1696	Philip VIII	

In 1678 the County of Burgundy was annexed by France as part of the Treaty of Nijmegen, and the title fell into abeyance.

== Duchess consort of Burgundy ==
=== Independent Burgundy (880–1044) ===
==== Bosonid dynasty (880–956) ====
The first margrave (marchio), later duke (dux), of Burgundy was Richard of the House of Ardennes, whose duchy was created from the merging of several regional counties of the kingdom of Provence which had belonged to his brother Boso.

His descendants and their relatives by marriage ruled the duchy until its annexation over a century later by the French crown, their suzerain.

Image	Name	Father	Born	Married	Became Duchess	Ceased to be Duchess	Died	Spouse
	Adelaide of Auxerre	Conrad the Younger, Count of Auxerre (Elder Welfs)	c. 849	c. 888		1 September 921 husband's death	c. 929	Richard I
	Emma of France	Robert I, King of the West Franks (Robertians)	894	910/914/921	1 September 921 husband's accession	13 July 923 husband's abdication as Duke and accession as King of the Franks	2 November 934	Rudolph I

==== Robertian dynasty (956–1004) ====
Image	Name	Father	Born	Married	Became Duchess	Ceased to be Duchess	Died	Spouse
	Ermengard of Burgundy	Richard I (Bosonids)	?	938	17 December 952 husband's accession	8 April 956 husband's death	?	Gilbert
	Liutgard of Burgundy	Gilbert	?	Easter 955	8 April 956 husband's accession	22 February 965 husband's death	?	Otto
	Gerberga	Unknown or Lambert I, Count of Chalon	?	973/5		11 December 986/991		Odo-Henry
	Gersenda of Gascony	William II, Duke of Gascony	?	June 992		996 divorce or death	?	Odo-Henry
	Ermentrude de Roucy	Renaud de Roucy, Count of Rheims (Ardennes-Metz)	958	982	15 October 1002 husband's accession	5 March 1002/1005		Otto-William

=== Burgundy under the French (1044–1477) ===
==== House of Capet (1004–1032) ====
In 1004, Burgundy was annexed by the king, of the House of Capet. Otto II William continued to rule what would come to be called the Free County of Burgundy. His descendants formed another House of Ivrea.

Image	Name	Father	Born	Married	Became Duchess	Ceased to be Duchess	Died	Spouse
	Constance of Arles	William I, Count of Provence (Arles)	986	1003	1004 husband's accession	1016 husband's death	25 July 1034	Robert the Pious

==== House of Burgundy (1032–1361) ====
Robert, son of Robert II of France, received the Duchy as a peace settlement, having disputed the succession to the throne of France with his brother Henry.

Image	Name	Father	Born	Married	Became Duchess	Ceased to be Duchess	Died	Spouse
	Hélie of Semur	Damásio, Seigneur d'Semur	1015/6	1033		1046 repudiated	1056	Robert I
	Ermengarde of Anjou	Fulk III, Count of Anjou (Angevins)	1018	1046/8		18 March 1076		Robert I
	Sibille of Nevers	William I, Count of Nevers (Nevers)	1058	1075	21 March 1076 husband's accession	1078		Hugh I
	Sybilla of Burgundy	William I, Free Count of Burgundy (Ivrea)	1065	1079/80		1101/03		Odo I
	Felicia-Matilda of Mayenne	Gauthier, Count of Mayenne	1080	1115		1143 husband's death	1162/3	Hugh II
	Marie of Champagne	Theobald II, Count of Champagne	1128	1145		27 September 1162 husband's death	7 August 1190	Odo II
	Alice of Lorraine	Matthias I, Duke of Lorraine (Ardennes-Metz)	1145	1165		1183 repudiated	1200	Hugh III
	Béatrice of Albon and Viennois	Guigues V, Count of Albon and Dauphin of Viennois (Albon)	1161	1183		25 August 1192 husband's death	1228	Hugh III
	Theresa of Portugal	Afonso I of Portugal (Burgundy)	1157	1193		January 1195 repudiated	20 May 1218	Odo III
	Alice of Vergy	Hugh, Lord of Vergy (Vergy)	1182	1199		6 July 1218 husband's death	1252	Odo III
	Yolande of Dreux	Robert III, Count of Dreux (Dreux)	1212	1279		30 October 1248		Hugh IV
	Beatrice of Navarre	Theobald I of Navarre (Champagne)	1242	November 1258		27 October 1271 husband's death	1295	Hugh IV
	Agnes of France	Louis IX of France (Direct Capetians)	1260	1229		21 March 1306 husband's death	19 December 1327	Robert II
	Joan III, Countess of Burgundy	Philip V of France (Direct Capetians)	1/2 May 1308	18 June 1318		13 August 1347		Eudes IV
	Margaret III, Countess of Flanders	Louis II of Flanders (Dampierre)	13 April 1350	14 May 1357		21 November 1361 husband's death	16/21 March 1405	Philip I

==== House of Valois-Burgundy (1361–1477) ====
John II of France, the second Valois king, successfully claimed the Duchy after the death of Philip, the last Capet duke. John then passed the duchy to his younger son Philip as an apanage.

Image	Name	Father	Born	Married	Became Duchess	Ceased to be Duchess	Died	Spouse	Arms
	Margaret III of Flanders	Louis II of Flanders (Dampierre)	13 April 1350	19 June 1369		27 April 1404 husband's death	16/21 March 1405	Philip II	
	Margaret of Bavaria	Albert I, Duke of Bavaria (Wittelsbach)	1363	12 April 1385	27 April 1404 husband's accession	10 September 1419 husband's death	23 January 1423	John II	
	Michelle of Valois	Charles VI of France (Valois)	11 January 1395	June 1409	10 September 1419 husband's accession	8 July 1422		Philip III	
	Bonne of Artois	Philip of Artois, Count of Eu (Artois)	1396	30 November 1424		17 September 1425		Philip III	
	Isabella of Portugal	John I of Portugal (Aviz)	21 February 1397	7 January 1430		15 July 1467 husband's death	17 December 1471	Philip III	
	Margaret of York	Richard Plantagenet, 3rd Duke of York (Plantagenet)	3 May 1446	9 July 1468		5 January 1477 husband's death	23 November 1503	Charles I	

=== Burgundy in pretension (1477–1477) ===
==== House of Habsburg (1482–1795) ====
In 1477, the territory of the Duchy of Burgundy was annexed by France. In the same year, Mary married Maximilian, Archduke of Austria, giving the Habsburgs control of the remainder of the Burgundian Inheritance.

Although the territory of the Duchy of Burgundy itself remained in the hands of France, the Habsburgs remained in control of the title of Duke of Burgundy and the other parts of the Burgundian inheritance, notably the Low Countries and the Free County of Burgundy in the Holy Roman Empire. They often used the term Burgundy to refer to it (e.g. in the name of the Imperial Circle it was grouped into), until the late 18th century, when the Austrian Netherlands were lost to French Republic. The Habsburgs also continued to claim Burgundy proper until the Treaty of Cambrai in 1529, when they surrendered their claim in exchange for French recognition of Imperial sovereignty over Flanders and Artois.

Image	Name	Father	Born	Married	Became Duchess	Ceased to be Duchess	Died	Spouse	Arms
	Joanna I of Castile	Ferdinand II of Aragon (Trastámara)	6 November 1479	20 October 1496		25 September 1506 husband's death	12 April 1555	Philip IV	
	Isabella of Portugal	Manuel I of Portugal (Aviz)	24 October 1503	11 March 1526		1 May 1539		Charles II	
	Mary I of England	Henry VIII of England (Tudor)	18 February 1516	25 July 1554	16 January 1556 husband's ascension	17 November 1558		Philip IV	
	Elisabeth of Valois	Henry II of France (Valois-Angoulême)	2 April 1545	22 June 1559		3 October 1568		Philip IV	
	Anna of Austria	Maximilian II, Holy Roman Emperor (Habsburg)	1 November 1549	4 May 1570		26 October 1580		Philip IV	
	Margaret of Austria	Maximilian II, Holy Roman Emperor (Habsburg)	25 December 1584	18 April 1599		3 October 1611		Philip V	
	Elisabeth of Bourbon	Henry IV of France (Bourbon)	22 November 1602	25 November 1615	31 March 1621 husband's ascension	6 October 1644		Philip VI	
	Mariana of Austria	Ferdinand III, Holy Roman Emperor (Habsburg)	24 December 1634	7 October 1649		17 September 1665 husband's death	16 May 1696	Philip VI	
	Marie Louise of Orléans	Philippe I, Duke of Orléans (Orléans)	26 March 1662	19 November 1679		12 February 1689		Charles III	
	Maria Anna of Neuburg	Philipp Wilhelm, Elector Palatine (Wittelsbach)	28 October 1667	14 May 1690		1 November 1700 husband's death	16 July 1740	Charles III	
	Elisabeth Christine of Brunswick-Wolfenbüttel	Louis Rudolph, Duke of Brunswick-Lüneburg (Welf)	28 August 1691	1 August 1708	11 April 1713 husband's ascension	20 October 1740 husband's death	21 December 1750	Charles IV	
	Francis III of Lorraine	Leopold, Duke of Lorraine (Lorraine)	8 December 1708	12 February 1736	20 October 1740 wife's accession	18 August 1765		Maria Theresa	
	Maria Luisa of Spain	Charles III of Spain (Bourbon)	24 November 1745	5 August 1765	20 February 1790 husband's accession	1 March 1792 husband's death	15 May 1792	Leopold	
	Maria Theresa of Naples and Sicily	Ferdinand I of the Two Sicilies (Bourbon-Two Sicilies)	6 June 1772	15 September 1790	1 March 1792 husband's ascession	1794	13 April 1807	Francis II	
