= Gertrude the Elder of Brunswick =

Gertrude the Elder of Brunswick, also known as Gertrude of Egisheim, († 21 July 1077, buried in Brunswick Cathedral) donated along with her husband Liudolf of Brunswick the collegiate church of St. Blasius in Braunschweig and established the subsequent Welfenschatz (Guelph Treasure).

== Life ==
Gertrude's place and year of birth are unknown. She was married to Liudolf of Brunswick, Count in Derlingau and Gundigau, only son of Brun I, Count of Brunswick and his wife Gisela of Swabia. Gertrud outlived her husband by almost 40 years. They had four possibly five children: Brun(o), Ekbert I, Matilda, Ida (Irmingart) and possibly Agatha.

Gertrud was considered educated. After coming to Brunswick, she first had her husband's residence Dankwarderode Castle structurally improved. In 1030, together with her husband, she donated the collegiate church of St. Blasius which was located immediately adjacent to the castle. The church of St. Blasius was the predecessor of the Brunswick Cathedral, built by Henry the Lion beginning in 1173. The monastery was dedicated to the Virgin Mary, John the Baptist and Saints Peter and Paul. The building was designed as a burial place of the Brunons.

In addition, Gertrud donated some altar equipment which, as relics of the later cathedral, formed the basis of the Guelph treasure of future centuries. De Winter names four pieces that Gertrude probably commissioned: two large crosses (the so-called "Gertrudis Cross" and "Liudolf Cross", both created shortly after 1038), a supporting altar and the arm reliquary of St. Blaise. Only the arm reliquary is still in Brunswick today in the Herzog Anton Ulrich Museum, founded there in 1829. The object known as the "Gertrudistragaltar", on the other hand, was sold in 1930 and is in the Cleveland Museum of Art in the United States. There are also the two lecture crosses.

Liudolf died in 1038 and was the first to be buried in the new burial place. From then on, Gertrud took care of the education of their common, underage sons, trying to cultivate and strengthen the Brunonian family traditions. 39 years later, Gertrud was laid to rest at her husband's side. When her grave was opened in 1668, fragments of a small lead tablet (7.5 × 10.5 cm), which was probably part of an epitaph, were found in it, with the inscription:

"Hic requiescit Gertrudis devota Christi famula. XII Kal. Augusti"

– Hermann Dürre: Geschichte der Stadt Braunschweig im Mittelalter. p. 51. "Here rests Gertrude, devoted servant of Christ."

The plaque is also in the Herzog Anton Ulrich Museum today.

In 1173, Henry the Lion began the construction of the cathedral, probably in the same place where Gertrude's collegiate church, including her tomb, had been located until then. In 1935, the National Socialists exhumed the remains of Gertrude, Henry the Lion and his second wife Mathilde of England. Gertrude was then buried in a new crypt in a common stone coffin together with the remains of Egbert II, Margrave of Meissen and her granddaughter Gertrude the Younger of Brunswick.

The Brunswick "Gertrudenstraße" is named after her granddaughter Gertrud the Younger of Brunswick, who died in 1117.

== Family ==
Gertrude married Liudolf of Brunswick had the following children:

- Bruno II (around 1024 – 26 June 1057)
- Egbert I, Margrave of Meissen (died 1068)
- Matilda of Frisia (died 1044); married King Henry I of France.
- Ida of Elsdorf, married to Leopold (Luitpold, Lippold) of Babenberg †1043 Hungarian March. Their daughter Oda of Stade married Sviatoslav II Yaroslavich, Grand Prince of Kiev.

A fifth speculated child is:

- (possibly) Agatha, wife of Edward the Exile, of the royal family of England, the mother of Edgar the Ætheling and Saint Margaret of Scotland.
