= Matilda of France =

Queen consort of Burgundy from 964 to 992

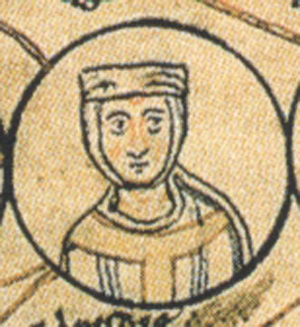
- Depiction in the Ottonian genealogy, Chronica sancti Pantaleonis (12th century)

Queen consort of Burgundy
- Tenure: 964–992
- Born: c. 943
- Died: 981–990/992
- Burial: Vienne Cathedral
- Spouse: Conrad I of Burgundy (m. 964)
- Issue: Bertha, Queen of France; Rudolph III of Burgundy; Gerberga, Duchess of Swabia
- Dynasty: Carolingian
- Father: Louis IV of France
- Mother: Gerberga of Saxony

Matilda of France (c. 943 – 981–990/992), a member of the Carolingian dynasty, was Queen of Burgundy from about 964 until her death, by her marriage with King Conrad I.

== Life ==
She was born in late 943 to King Louis IV of France (920/921–954), ruler of West Francia, and his wife, Gerberga of Saxony (d. about 984), sister of the East Frankish king Otto I. At the time of her birth, Carolingian rule had already weakened: King Louis attempted to stabilize his reign by marrying an East Frankish princess, while he fought with the reluctant dukes of Normandy and with the forces of his Robertian rival Hugh the Great.

When Matilda's brother, 13-year-old Lothair ascended the French throne in 954, Gerberga acted as regent. In 964 Matilda was married to Conrad, the Welf ruler of the Kingdom of Burgundy since 937. King Conrad strongly relied on the support of Otto I, Holy Roman Emperor since 962, Matilda's maternal uncle and husband of Conrad's sister Adelaide. As her dowry, the young queen brought her husband the city of Vienne, which her brother Lothair had ceded to her.

== Issue ==
Her children were:

- Gerberga (c. 965 – 1018/19), married firstly to Herman I, Count of Werl and secondly to Herman II, Duke of Swabia
- Bertha (967 – after 1010), married firstly to Odo I, Count of Blois, secondly to King Robert II of France
- Rudolph III of Burgundy (c. 970 – 1032)
- Matilda (born 975), possibly married Robert, Count of Geneva

Matilda was outlived by her husband, she probably died after 980. (Note: Penelope Nash indicates Matilda's death occurs from 981-992.) She is buried in Vienne Cathedral.

== Sources ==
- Bourchard, Constance Brittain (1999). "Burgundy and Provence, 879-1032". In McKitterick, Rosamond; Reuter, Timothy (eds.). The New Cambridge Medieval History. Vol. 3, C.900 – c.1024. Cambridge University Press.
- Nash, Penelope (2017). Empress Adelheid and Countess Matilda: Medieval Female Rulership and the Foundations of European Society. Palgrave Macmillan.
