= Matilda of Frisia =

Queen of the Franks from 1034 to 1044

Queen consort of the Franks
- Tenure: 1034–1044
- Died: 1044 (aged 19–20); Paris
- Burial: Basilica of St Denis
- Spouse: Henry I of France
- House: Brunonids
- Father: Liudolf, Margrave of Frisia
- Mother: Gertrude of Egisheim

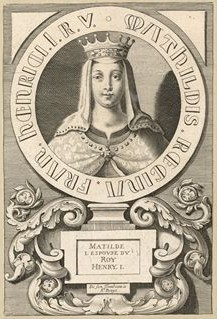
Portrait of Matilda of Frisia

Matilda of Frisia (died in 1044) was Queen of the Franks as the first wife of Henry I. Her date of birth is unknown.

She was the daughter of Liudolf, Margrave of Frisia, and Gertrude of Egisheim.

Matilda and Henry were married in 1034 after the premature death of his fiancée Matilda of Franconia, who was the daughter of Holy Roman Emperor Conrad II and Gisela of Swabia. Matilda of Frisia was herself Emperor Conrad II's step granddaughter.

Around 1040, Matilda of Frisia gave birth to a daughter via Caesarian section, but four years later in 1044 both she and her daughter died only weeks apart. Matilda was buried in St Denis Abbey, but her tomb is not preserved.

Henry married Anne of Kiev after Matilda of Frisia's death.

French royalty
Preceded by Constance of Arles	Queen consort of France; 1034–1044	Succeeded by Anne of Kiev
