= Egbert I =

Egbert I may refer to:

- Ecgberht of Kent, King of Kent from 664 to 673
- Ecgberht I of Northumbria (died 873), king
- Egbert I, Margrave of Meissen (died in 1068)
