= Herman III of Swabia =

Hermann III (c.994/995 - April 1, 1012) was a member of the Conradine dynasty. He was Duke of Swabia from 1003 until 1012.

== Life ==
Hermann was the son of Herman II, Duke of Swabia and his wife Gerberga of Burgundy, daughter of Conrad I of Burgundy. He had many illustrious relatives. Through his father, Hermann was descended from Henry the Fowler; through his mother from Louis IV of France, Alfred the Great and Charlemagne. Hermann's sister, Gisela of Swabia, married Emperor Conrad II.

=== Inheritance and regency ===
In 1003, when Hermann was about nine years old, his father died and Hermann inherited the duchy of Swabia. Since he was a minor, Hermann's reign as duke was effectively controlled by his cousin, the King of Germany, Henry II, who was his guardian. Henry II was mistrustful of the Conradines. Herman III's father, Herman II, had opposed the election of Henry II as king of Germany in 1002, and promoted himself as a rival candidate for the throne. Henry II thus used his position as Hermann's guardian to limit the power of the dukes of Swabia. He took control of key places in Swabia himself (including Hohentwiel, Breisach and Zürich), and replaced the ducal mint with a royal mint. He separated Alsace from the duchy of Swabia and gave control of Alsace to one of his relatives, Count Gerhard. Henry's control over Swabia was still present when Hermann died, aged about eighteen, in 1012.

Hermann III did not marry and had no heirs. The male line of the Conradines of Swabia came to an end with his death. Henry II selected Ernest to succeed him; two years later, Ernest married Hermann's sister Gisela of Swabia.

== Sources ==
- Herwig Wolfram (2006). Conrad II, 990-1039: Emperor of Three Kingdoms. Translated by Denise A. Kaiser. The Pennsylvania State University Press.
- S.Weinfurter, Heinrich II. (1002-1024) Herrscher am Ende der Zeiten
- Weinfurter, Stefan (1992). The Salian Century: Main Currents in an Age of Transition. Translated by Bowlus, Barbara M. University of Pennsylvania Press.

| Preceded by Hermann II | Duke of Swabia; 1003–1012 | Succeeded by Ernest I |
