= Rudolph III of Burgundy =

King of Burgundy from 993 to 1032

Rudolph III
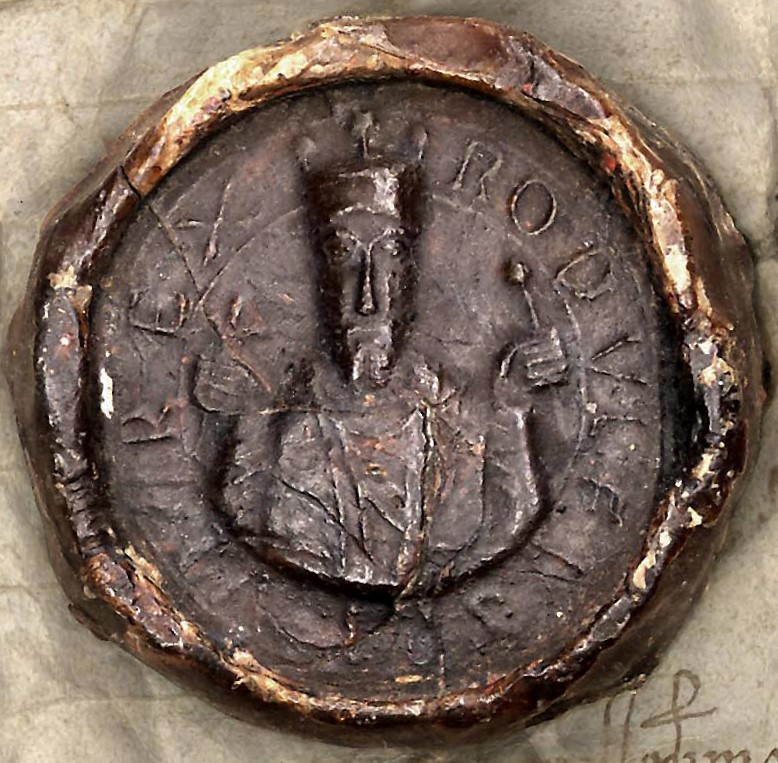
- Seal of Rudolph III

King of Burgundy
- Reign: 19 October 993 – 6 September 1032
- Predecessor: Conrad I
- Successor: Conrad II
- Born: c. 970
- Died: 6 September 1032 (aged 61 or 62)
- Burial: Lausanne Cathedral
- Consort: Agiltrud; Ermengarde of Burgundy
- Issue: Hugo, Bishop of Lausanne (illegitimate)
- House: Elder House of Welf
- Father: Conrad I of Burgundy
- Mother: Matilda of France

Rudolph III (French: Rodolphe, German: Rudolf; c. 970 – 6 September 1032), called the Idle or the Pious, was the king of Burgundy from 993 until his death. He was the last ruler of an independent Kingdom of Burgundy, and the last legitimate male member of the Burgundian line of the Elder House of Welf.

== Family ==
Rudolph was the son and heir of King Conrad I of Burgundy (925–993). His mother, Matilda (943–980), a member of the Frankish Carolingian dynasty, was the daughter of King Louis IV of France. Rudolph himself had four sisters: an elder half sister, Gisela, who married the Ottonian duke Henry II of Bavaria some time before 972, and became the mother of Emperor Henry II, and three full sisters: Bertha, who married, firstly, Count Odo I of Blois in 983, and, secondly, King Robert II of France in 996; Matilda, who possibly married Count Robert of Geneva; and Gerberga, who married Duke Herman II of Swabia in about 988. He also had a half-brother, Burchard, archbishop of Lyon.

== Reign ==
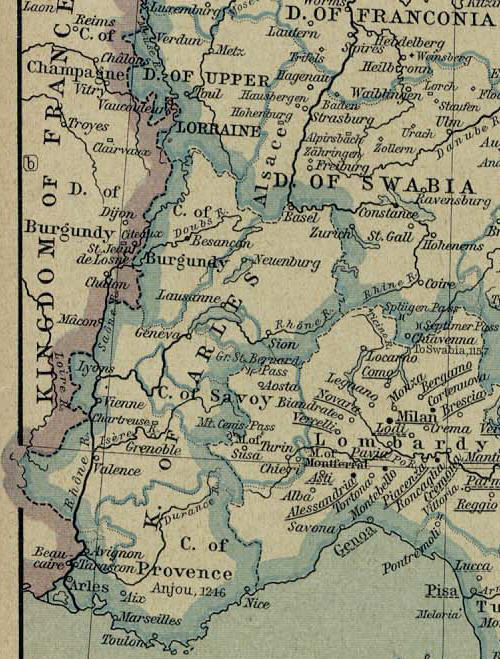
Map of the Kingdom of Burgundy by William R. Shepherd (1926)

Rudolph succeeded to the throne of the Kingdom of Arles upon his father's death on 19 October 993 and was crowned king in Lausanne. His reign was marked with turbulence when he made attempts to confiscate several Burgundian estates. Unable to placate the increasingly powerful nobility, he also had to deal with encroachments of power on the part of Count Otto-William of Burgundy.

Like his father, Rudolph approached to the German Ottonian dynasty to stabilise his rule. His aunt Adelaide, widow of Emperor Otto I, and her grandson Otto III actively intervened in Burgundian affairs to secure his accession to power. In turn, Rudolph in 1006 ceded the city of Basel to his nephew Henry II, elected king of Germany in 1002.

Rudolph's first marriage with one Agiltrud (died 1011) remained childless. On 28 June 1011, he married Ermengarde, a relative of Count Humbert I of Savoy and widow of Count Rotbold II of Provence. Rudolph vested her with the County of Vienne and Sermorens and further large estates up to Lake Geneva. However, no children were born from his second marriage too.

In 1016 King Rudolph entered into another conflict with Count Otto-William over the investiture of the archbishop of Besançon. He and Emperor Henry II met in Strasbourg where Henry succeeded in negotiating Rudolph to name him as his successor. Henry marched against Otto-William and the Burgundian nobles quickly submitted. Henry's right of succession was confirmed at a 1018 diet in Mainz; however, upon his death in 1024, the question appeared again unsettled. Henry's Salian successor, King Conrad II occupied Basel and also began to negotiate with Rudolph to become his heir. Rudolph was present at Conrad's imperial coronation at Easter 1027 and in August an inheritance contract was concluded. This agreement was contested by Rudolph's nobles, Counts Odo II of Blois and Reginald I of Burgundy.

Rudolph died in 1032, at the age of 61, with no surviving legitimate issue. He was buried in Lausanne Cathedral. Conrad II then claimed the Kingdom of Burgundy and incorporated it in the Holy Roman Empire.

Rudolph's only attested illegitimate offspring, Hugo, was elected Bishop of Lausanne in 1018 or 1019 and served in this capacity until his death on 31 August 1037. He does not seem to have aspired to succeed his father in the kingship, and had attended on Emperor Henry II in 1019. On his death, Bishop Hugo was buried in Lausanne Cathedral next to his father, King Rudolph.

== Legacy ==
As the last legitimate member of the Burgundian Welfs, Rudolph was considered a weak ruler by his contemporaries. The chronicler Wipo of Burgundy called him effete; according to Hermann of Reichenau, his rule was marked by idleness and chaos. Thietmar of Merseburg named the Burgundian counts the actual rulers, while Rudolph only held the royal title.

At least from 1018, Rudolph actually ruled as a mock king in the shadow of his designated successor, Emperor Henry II, who also interfered in domestic conflicts. Emperor Conrad II likewise had to defend his right of succession against the embittered resistance of the Burgundian nobility.

== Sources ==
- Bouchard, Constance Brittain (1999). "Burgundy and Provence, 879–1032". In McKitterick, Rosamond; Reuter, Timothy (eds.). The New Cambridge Medieval History. Vol. 3, c.900 – c.1024. Cambridge University Press.
- Dessemontet, Olivier, "La Trêve de Dieu proclamée à Montriond sous Lausanne: état actuel de la question," Revue historique vaudoise 76 (1968) 35-54, online.
- Planta, Peter Conradin von, "Hugues de Bourgogne," in: Dictionnaire historique de la Suisse, version 2011, online (consulted 4 August 2024).
- Previte-Orton, C.W. (1912). The Early History of the House of Savoy. Cambridge University Press.

Rudolph III of Burgundy Elder House of Welf Born: c. 970 Died: 6 September 1032
Preceded by Conrad I	King of Burgundy; 993–1032	Succeeded by Conrad II
