= Liudolf =

Liudolf may refer to:

- Liudolf, Duke of Saxony (c. 805–c. 864)
- Liudolf, Duke of Swabia (930–957)
- Liudolf, Margrave of Frisia (c. 1003–1038)
