= Matilda of Germany =

Matilda of Germany can refer to:

- Matilda of Germany, Countess Palatine of Lotharingia (979 – 1025), Countess Palatine of Lotharingia
- Matilda of Frisia (died 1044), Queen of the Franks as the first wife of Henry I of France
