= County of Brunswick =

County in the medieval Duchy of Saxony

The County of Brunswick was a county in the medieval Duchy of Saxony. It existed from about the 9th century until 1235, when it was raised to a duchy, the Duchy of Brunswick-Lüneburg.

The county developed out of the possessions of the Brunonen dynasty centered on the town of Brunswick and was enlarged by the inheritances of Henry the Fat of Northeim around Northeim and Göttingen and a part of the Billung inheritance around Lüneburg, which fell to the House of Welf in 1106. When the Duchy of Saxony was reorganized in 1180, the county became de facto independent from the Duchy, since the new Ascanian dukes could not establish control over it. In 1203, the three sons of Duke Henry the Lion divided the county among themselves; Henry received the western part including Hannover and Göttingen, William received the area around Lüneburg, and King Otto IV the area around Braunschweig. The independence of Brunswick was recognized when it was raised to the Duchy of Brunswick-Lüneburg in 1235, which would exist until 1918.

== Counts ==
For later rulers, see Duchy of Brunswick-Lüneburg. The list may be incomplete.

=== Brunonen dynasty ===
- Brun I (in office before 991, died 1015/16)
- Liudolf (died 1038)
- Brun II (died 1057)
- Ekbert I (died 1068)
- Ekbert II (died 1090)

=== Northeim dynasty ===
- Henry the Fat (died 1101)

=== Süpplingenburg dynasty ===
- Lothair (died 1137)

=== Welf dynasty ===
- Henry the Proud (died 1139)
- Henry the Lion (deposed 1180, died 1195)
- Jointly:
  - William of Winchester (died 1215)
  - Otto IV, Holy Roman Emperor (died 1218)
  - Henry V, Count Palatine of the Rhine (died 1227)
- Otto the Child (raised to duke in 1235)
