= Queen Matilda =

Queen Matilda or Queen Mathilde may refer to:

- Matilda of Ringelheim (877–968), Saint Matilda, Queen of Eastern Francia
- Matilda of Frisia (died 1044), Queen of the Franks, wife of King Henry I
- Matilda of Flanders (c. 1031–1083), Queen of the English, wife of William the Conqueror
- Matilda, Countess of Northampton (c. 1074–1130/1131), Queen of Scotland, wife of King David I
- Matilda of Scotland (c. 1080–1118, Queen of the English, wife of King Henry I
- Empress Matilda (c. 1102–1167), Matilda of England, Holy Roman Empress, Queen of Germany, claimant to throne of England
- Matilda of Boulogne (c. 1105–1152), Queen of the English, wife of King Stephen
- Matilda of Savoy, Queen of Portugal (1125–1158), wife of King Afonso I
- Matilda of Dammartin (1202–1259), Queen of Portugal, wife of King Afonso III
- Maud of Wales (1869–1938), Queen of Norway, wife of King Haakon VII
- Queen Mathilde of Belgium (born 1973), Queen of the Belgians, wife of King Philippe
