= Brun I of Brunswick =

Count of Brunswick

Brun (Latin Bruno; born around 975, died around 1010), was Count in the Derlingau, the Nordthüringgau, the Hastfalagau, the Salzgau, the Gau Gretinge, and the Gau Mulbeze, with Brunswick as his residence. Brun was a member of the Brunones dynasty.

Brun's father is assumed to have been Count Liudolf (died 993). In 1002, Brun married Gisela of Swabia, who later became wife of the Emperor. Their oldest son was Liudolf (about 1003–1038).

In 990, Brun was a member of the Saxon army that supported Mieszko I, Duke of Poland, against Boleslaus II, Duke of Bohemia, in Silesia. Brun participated in the election for King of the Romans of 1002 (after the death of Otto III, Holy Roman Emperor) as a candidate and elector. When his own candidacy failed, he supported Herman II, Duke of Swabia, whose daughter, Gisela, he married in the same year.
