= Bruno II of Brunswick =

Bruno II (died 26 June 1057) was the count of Brunswick. He belonged to the Brunonen family. In 1038 he succeeded his father Liudolf, Margrave of Frisia. His mother was Gertrude, the daughter of Count Hugo and sister of Pope Leo IX.

In 1057, Bruno and his brother Ekbert, who were cousins of King Henry IV, were involved in a dispute with Otto, Margrave of the Nordmark. When Otto was persuaded by the Saxons to aim for the kingship and depose Henry, his army was met near Merseburg on 26 June by Bruno and Ekbert. In the ensuing skirmish, both Otto and Bruno were killed. In the words of Lampert of Hersfeld, "thus the commonwealth was delivered from the greatest danger and, once deprived of the standardbearer of the rebellion, the Saxons attempted no further hostilities against the king." He was succeeded by his brother.

== Bibliography ==
- Robinson, I. S. (2004) [2000]. Henry IV of Germany, 1056–1106. Cambridge University Press.
- Ward, Emily Joan (2022). Royal Childhood and Child Kingship: Boy Kings in England, Scotland, France and Germany, c. 1050–1262. Cambridge University Press.
