= Hugh of Burgundy (bishop of Lausanne) =

Hugues of Bourgogne was the Bishop of Lausanne from 1018 to 1037.

He was the illegitimate son of Rudolph III of Burgundy. He was elected Bishop of Lausanne in 1018 or 1019 and served in this capacity until his death on 31 August 1037. He does not seem to have aspired to succeed his father as king, but had attended on Emperor Henry II in 1019. On his death, Bishop Hugo was buried in Lausanne Cathedral next to his father, King Rudolph.

== Sources ==
- Dessemontet, Olivier, "La Trêve de Dieu proclamée à Montriond sous Lausanne: état actuel de la question," Revue historique vaudoise 76 (1968) 35-54, online.
- Planta, Peter Conradin von, "Hugues de Bourgogne," in: Dictionnaire historique de la Suisse, version 2011, online (consulted 4 August 2024).
