= Bertha of Burgundy =

Queen of the Franks from 996 to 1001

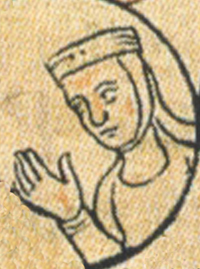
- From the Genealogy of the Ottonians (late 12th century)

Queen consort of the Franks
- Tenure: 996–1001
- Born: 964
- Died: 16 January 1010 (aged 45–46)
- Spouse: Odo I, Count of Blois; Robert II of France
- Issue: Theobald II of Blois; Odo II, Count of Blois
- House: Elder House of Welf
- Father: Conrad of Burgundy
- Mother: Matilda of France

Bertha of Burgundy (964 – 16 January 1010) was Queen consort of the Franks as the second wife of King Robert II.

== Life ==
Bertha was the daughter of King Conrad I of Burgundy and his wife Matilda, daughter of King Louis IV of France and Gerberga of Saxony. She was named for her father's mother, Bertha of Swabia.

Bertha first married Count Odo I of Blois in about 983. They had several children, including Theobald II and Odo II.

After the death of her husband in 996, Bertha's second cousin Robert, the eldest son of King Hugh Capet of France, wished to marry her. He had recently repudiated his first wife, Susanna of Italy, who was many years his senior. The union between Robert and Bertha was opposed by King Hugh, who feared that political problems could be caused by religious authorities due to their consanguinity. In addition to being related in the third degree, Robert was also the godfather of one of Bertha's children. The marriage nevertheless went ahead, officiated by Archambaud, Archbishop of Tours, around the time of Hugh's death in October 996, which left Robert as sole king. Pope Gregory V and his successor Pope Sylvester II pronounced anathemas against Robert for his "incestuous" marriage and the pair were forced to separate, but Robert several times attempted to rejoin her. The marriage was formally dissolved in 1003 or 1004 and produced no children.

French royalty
Preceded by Susanna of Italy	Queen consort of the Franks; 996–1000	Succeeded by Constance of Arles
