= Brunonids =

Medieval Saxon noble family

The Brunonids (or Brunonians, German: Brunonen, Latin: Brunones, i.e. "Brunos") were a Saxon noble family in the 10th and 11th centuries, who owned property in Eastphalia (around Brunswick) and Frisia.

The Brunonids are assumed to be descendants of Brun, Duke of Saxony (d. 880). This would make them the senior branch of the Liudolfing house, to which the Ottonian emperors also belonged. This relationship is considered likely because the names Brun and Liudolf are both common among the Brunonids, and their properties are located in the same areas as the properties of the early Liudolfings. In addition, contemporaries seemed to regard the Brunonids as male-line relatives of the Ottonian kings, as shown by the candidacy for king of Brun I, Count of Brunswick. However, there is no evidence that the Brunonids are related to the Liudolfings, and nothing is known about the existence of any children of Duke Brun.

The oldest properties of the Brunonids were located in the Derlingau, from which they spread their influence to adjacent areas. The town of Brunswick, located at the western edge of the Derlingau, became their comital seat in the 9th or 10th century; according to legends, Brunswick (the name literally means "Brun's town") was founded by one of the Brunonids named Brun — it is unclear by which one. Their county came to be known as the County of Brunswick.

The next assumed member of the Brunonid (Brunoner) house was a Count Liudolf, who was mentioned in 942. The first certain member of the house was Brun I, Count of Brunswick, who is attested since 991. Count Bruno I sought without success to succeed Otto III in 1002 as King of the Romans. In 1067, Bruno's grandson Egbert was granted the Margraviate of Meissen by Emperor Henry IV. His son, Egbert II, opposed that same ruler and lost his rights to both Meissen and Frisia.

Egbert II's death marked the end of the Brunonid line. Egbert II's sister, Gertrude of Brunswick, had a daughter with her second husband, Henry the Fat, Margrave of Frisia of Northeim. This daughter, Richenza (d. 1141) married Lothar of Süpplingenburg, who was Duke of Saxony and later became Holy Roman Emperor. Their daughter Gertrude (d. 1143) married Duke Henry the Proud of Saxony and Bavaria, a member of the House of Welf. In this way, the Welf dynasty gained the Brunonid properties around Brunswick, which they would hold until the 20th century.

== Family tree ==
1. Brun I of Brunswick (d. 1015/1016), married Gisela of Swabia (b. c. 990; d. 15 February 1043 in Goslar) (married 1016/1017 Emperor Conrad II (d. 1039))
  1. Liudolf (d. 23 April 1038), married Gertrud of Frisia (d. 1077)
    1. Bruno II (b. c. 1024; d. 26. Juni 1057), Margrave of Frisia
    2. Egbert I (d. 1068), married Irmgard of Susa
      1. Egbert II (d. 1090), married Oda of Orlamünde
      2. Gertrude of Brunswick (d. 1117), married I. Dietrich of Katlenburg (d. 1085); II. Henry the Fat, Margrave of Northeim (d. 1101); III. Henry I, Margrave of Meissen (d. 1103)
