= Gerberga of Burgundy =

French noblewoman

- Born: c. 965/966; Arles
- Died: 7 July 1018/1019; Nordgau, Bavaria
- Noble family: Elder House of Welf
- Spouses: Herman I, Count of Werl; Herman II, Duke of Swabia
- Issue Detail: With Herman of Werl; Herman II, count of Werl; Rudolf (or Liudolf) of Werl; Bernard I of Werl; With Herman of Swabia; Matilda of Swabia; Gisela of Swabia; Herman III, Duke of Swabia
- Father: Conrad of Burgundy
- Mother: Matilda of France

Gerberga of Burgundy (c. 965/966 – 7 July 1018/1019) was a member of the Elder House of Welf. She was married firstly to Herman I, count of Werl and secondly to Herman II, Duke of Swabia.

== Life and issue ==
Gerberga was born in Arles in what was then the Kingdom of Arles of which her father was king. She was the daughter of King Conrad of Burgundy and his second wife, Matilda, daughter of Louis IV of France and Gerberga of Saxony. Her paternal aunt was Empress Adelaide. Through her mother, she was related to Louis IV of France, Emperor Otto I and Charlemagne.

=== First marriage ===
Gerberga married her first husband, Herman I, Count of Werl, c. 978. Herman of Werl died sometime between 985 and 988. With Herman of Werl, Gerberga had the following children:

- Herman II, count of Werl (c. 980 – 1025)
- Rudolf (or Liudolf) of Werl (c. 982/986 – 1044)
- Bernard I of Werl (c. 983 – 1027)

=== Second marriage ===
Gerberga married Herman II, Duke of Swabia in 988. With Herman of Swabia, Gerberga had several children, including:

- Matilda of Swabia
- Gisela, who became Queen consort of Germany then Empress consort of the Holy Roman Empire.
- Herman III, who succeeded his father in 1003, but died young, in 1012.
- Berthold (992–993)
- Beatrice (?) (died after 25 February 1025), who was married to Adalbert of Eppenstein

=== Patronage ===
In September 997 Otto III donated the estate of Stockhausen to the female monastery at Meschede at Gerberga's intervention. Stockhausen was located in the medieval district of Lochtrop, which was part of the county of Werl. In 997 the county of Werl was ruled by Gerberga's son from her first marriage, Herman II of Werl. The counts of Werl had long-standing connections with this monastery. Herman II's father, Herman I of Werl, was the advocate of Meschede. And one of his ancestors, also called Herman, likewise acted as advocate for Meschede in 913. Meschede may have been founded by Emhilids, one of Herman's ninth-century ancestors.

In May 1000 Otto III issued a diploma taking the female monastery of Oedingen into his protection. The diploma records that Oedingen, which was located in the district of Lochtrop, in the county of Werl, had been founded by Gerberga, with the permission of her son, Herman II of Werl. In 1042 Gerberga's granddaughter, also called Gerberga (she was the daughter of Herman II of Werl), became abbess of Oedingen.

== Death ==
Gerberga died in Nordgau, Bavaria. A necrology entry indicates that she died on 7 July, probably in 1018 or 1019.

== Sources ==
- Herwig Wolfram (2006). Conrad II, 990-1039: Emperor of Three Kingdoms. Translated by Denise A. Kaiser. The Pennsylvania State University Press.
- P. Leidinger, 'Die Grafen von Werl und Werl-Arnsberg (ca. 980–1124): Genealogie und Aspekte ihrer politischen Geschichte in ottonischer und salischer Zeit,' in, H. Klueting, ed., Das Herzogtum Westfalen, Band I, Das kurkölnische Herzogtum Westfalen von den Anfängen der kölnischen Herrschaft im südlichen Westfalen bis zur Säkularisierung 1803 (Münster, 2009).
- W. Glocker, Die Verwandten der Ottonen und ihre Bedeutung in der Politik. Studien zur Familienpolitik und zur Genealogie des sächsischen Kaiserhauses (1989).
- E. Brandenburg, Die Nachkommen Karls des Großen (1935).
- J. Bohmer and M. Uhlirz, Regesta Imperii II,3: Die Regesten des Kaiserreiches unter Otto III. 980 (983)-1002 (Graz-Cologne, 1956), accessible online at: Regesta Imperii II,3.
