= Magnar =

- Gender: Male
- Language: Norwegian

Origin
- Meaning: "Strength"

Magnar is a somewhat common forename for men in Norway. The name is known in Norway from the late 19th century. The name may be derived from the Norse word magn meaning "Strength" or possibly from the Latin name Magnus.

== Notable people ==
- Magnar Åm (born 1952), composer
- Magnar Lund Bergo (born 1949), politician
- Lars Magnar Enoksen (born 1960), Swedish writer and Glima wrestler
- Magnar Estenstad (1924–2004), cross country skier
- Magnar Fosseide (1913–1983), Norwegian Nordic combined skier
- Magnar Freimuth (born 1973), Estonian Nordic combined skier
- Magnar Hellebust (1914–2008), politician
- Tom Magnar Hetland (born 1954), journalist and editor
- Magnar G. Huseby (1928–2011), engineer and politician
- Magnar Ingebrigtsli (1932–2001), cross country skier and biathlete
- Magnar Isaksen (1910–1979), football player
- Bjarne Magnar Lerum (1941–2010), businessman and politician
- Magnar Lundemo (1938–1987), cross country skier and runner
- Magnar Lussand (born 1945), politician
- Magnar Norderhaug (1939–2006), zoologist and ecologist
- Magnar Ødegaard (born 1993), football player
- Magnar Sætre (1940–2002), politician
- Magnar Solberg (born 1937), biathlete
- Magnar Sortåsløkken (born 1947), politician
- Inge Magnar Valen (born 1951), football player
