= Gisela of Swabia =

Holy Roman Empress from 1027 to 1039

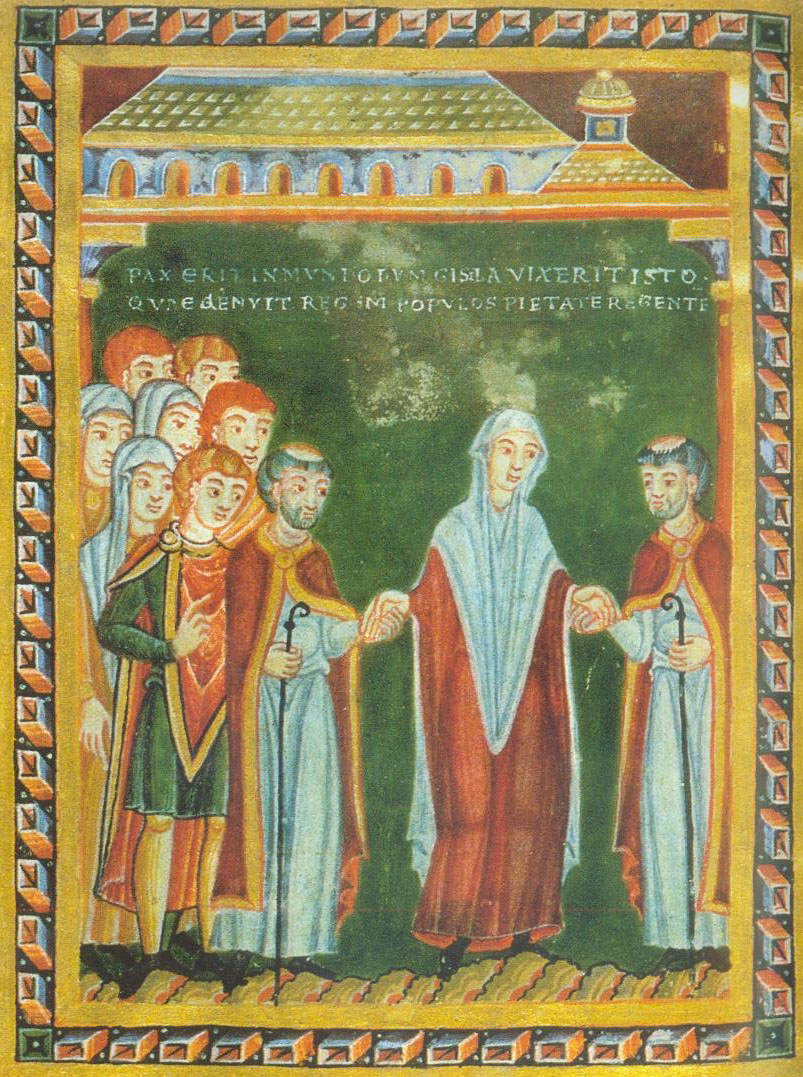
- Empress Gisela entering a church

Empress of the Holy Roman Empire
- Tenure: 1027–1039
- Coronation: 26 March 1027; St. Peter's Basilica, Rome
- Coronation: 21 September 1024; Cologne Cathedral
- Born: c. 990
- Died: 15 February 1043 (aged 52–53); Imperial Palace of Goslar, Saxony
- Burial: Speyer Cathedral
- Spouse: Brun I, Count of Brunswick; Ernest I, Duke of Swabia; Conrad II, Holy Roman Emperor
- Issue more...: Liudolf, Margrave of Frisia; Ernest II, Duke of Swabia; Herman IV, Duke of Swabia; Henry III, Holy Roman Emperor; Matilda of Franconia
- House: Conradines
- Father: Herman II, Duke of Swabia
- Mother: Gerberga of Burgundy

Gisela of Swabia (c. 990 – 15 February 1043), was queen of Germany from 1024 to 1039 and empress of the Holy Roman Empire from 1027 to 1039 by her third marriage with Emperor Conrad II. She was the mother of Emperor Henry III. She was regent of Swabia for her minor son Duke Ernest II of Swabia in 1015, although it seems at that time her husband Conrad was the one who held the reins of government, leading to the enmity between stepfather and stepson.

She was an active empress, exemplifying a tradition in which, up to the period of the Hohenstaufens, as the consors regni (ruling partner to the king or emperor), the queen and empress held a substantive role in the government, often intervening in the drafting of documents or even issuing documents in her own name. She reigned as regent for her absent husband in 1037.

== Early life ==
Gisela was the daughter of Duke Herman II of Swabia and Gerberga of Burgundy, daughter of King Conrad the Peaceful. Both her parents were descendants of Charlemagne. According to a plate found when her tomb was unearthed, she was born on 11 November 999, but that date cannot be reconciled with the records of her marriages.

Gisela first married the Saxon count Brun I of Brunswick, about 1002. Upon Brun's death, her second marriage was c. 1012 with the Babenberg scion Ernest, who had been enfeoffed with the Duchy of Swabia by King Henry II of Germany at the death of Gisela's brother, Duke Herman III and aimed at legitimising himself as his heir. After Ernest's early death in 1015, Gisela became regent for their minor son Duke Ernest II of Swabia.

== Queen and empress ==
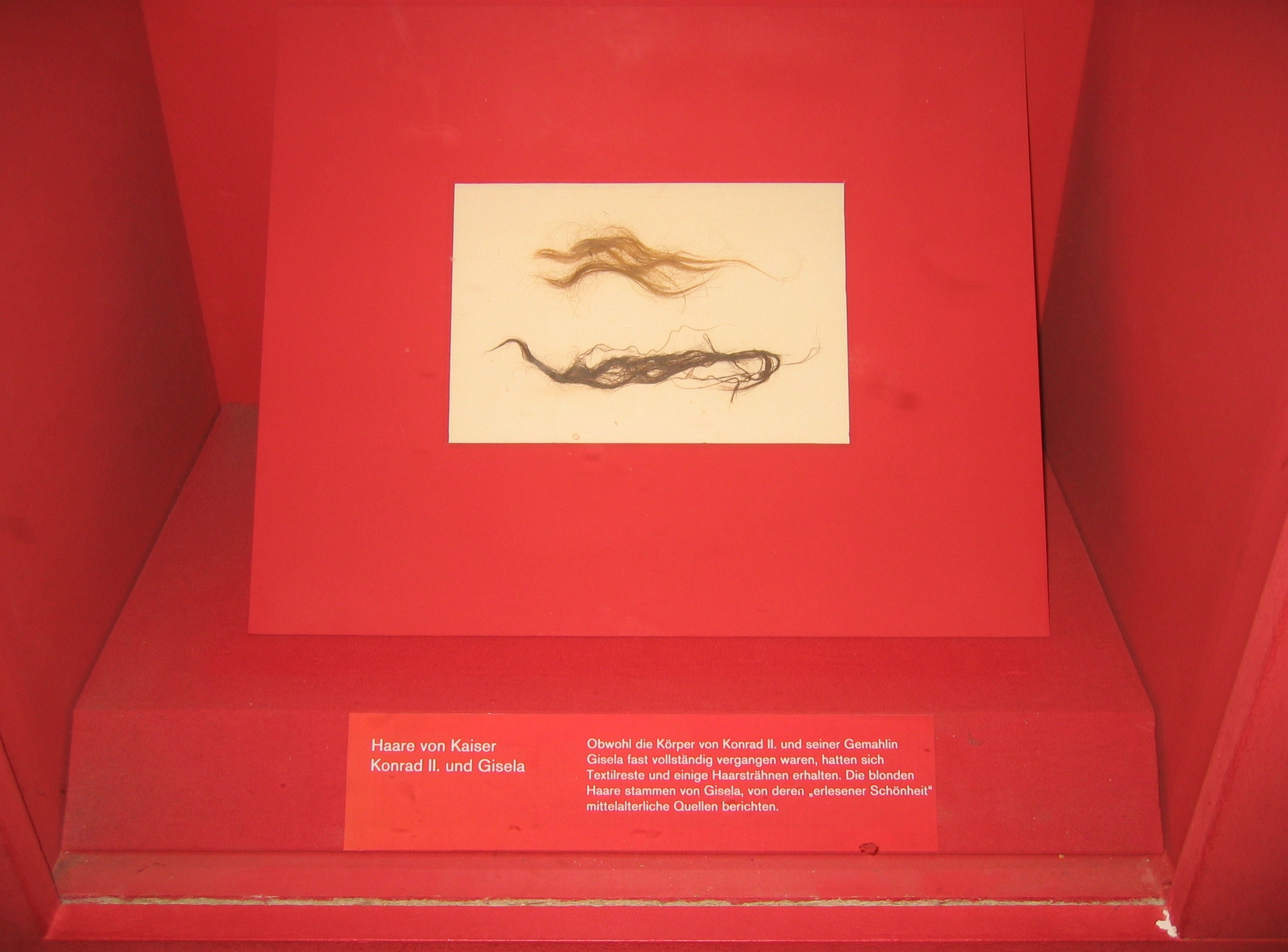
Hair of Conrad and Gisela, preserved in the Speyer Cathedral. The strand of blond hair belongs to Gisela.

Gisela's third marriage, which took place before January 1017, was to Conrad II, who was elected king of Germany in 1024 and became emperor of the Holy Roman Empire in 1027. According to Thietmar of Merseburg, Archbishop Aribo of Mainz refused to crown her as queen because Gisela and Conrad were too closely related, the couple both descending from King Henry the Fowler. She was instead crowned and anointed thirteen days after Conrad's coronation by Archbishop Pilgrim of Cologne. The Liber Generationum (a text about generations from the Creation to Jesus Christ) was read—a ritual of great importance, symbolizing the birth of a new dynasty. For the same reason, Henry II replaced her as her son's regent with Poppo of Trier, which became the source of conflict between Conrad and Henry.

Gisela played an active part in politics, attending Imperial councils. Also, she participated in several synods of the church. She took care of her sister Matilda's daughters Sophie and Beatrice, who later ruled Bar and Tuscany, respectively.

In 1027, she mediated between Conrad and King Rudolph III of Burgundy, her uncle, leading to a peace agreement in Mutten, near Basel. Rudolph recognized her husband's right of succession in Burgundy.

She tried to mediate between Conrad and her son Ernest II, Duke of Swabia, who repeatedly rebelled against his stepfather. All her efforts broke down though, when in 1030, Ernest refused to act against his friend and vassal Werner of Kyburg and impose peace. She had to give up and swear a public oath not to take revenge should any measure be taken against her son, who had received an imperial ban. In the end, Ernest lost his life fighting against Count Manegold, who was charged by Bishop Warmann of Constance (the guardian of Hermann, her younger son who had become the new duke by then) to reestablish the peace breached by Ernest, Werner and their men.

In 1032, she interceded successfully on the behalf of King Mieszko II Lambert, who regained the favour of Conrad.

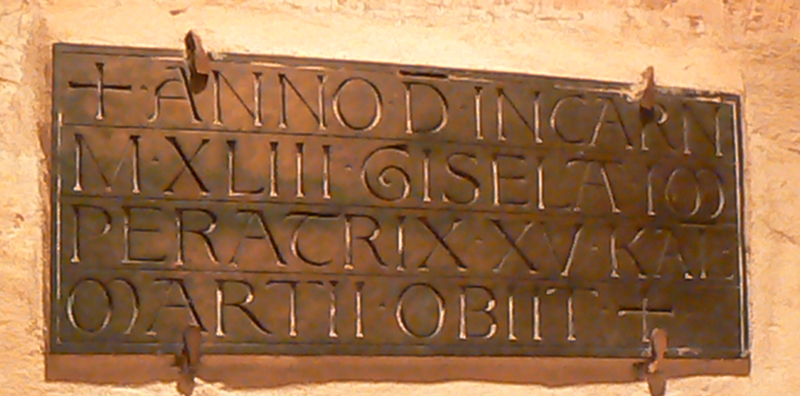
Gisela's epitaph in Speyer Cathedral

She was a long-time donor and patron of the Speyer Cathedral, paying close attention to the development of her family's memorial culture there.

After Conrad's death in 1039, she and her son Henry III led the mourning progression.

During the 1030s, she played an important role as the patron of the new church reform movement. In 1037, she ruled as regent on behalf of Conrad who returned to Italy to deal with a new crisis.

The empress died of dysentery at the Imperial Palace of Goslar in 1043. She is interred in the grotto of Speyer Cathedral, Germany along with several emperors and other members of the imperial family.

== Appearance and personality ==
Gisela was known for "her most becoming appearance". Gisela's tomb in Speyer was opened in 1900 and her mummified body was found to be 172 cm (5 ft 8 in) tall, with long blond hair.

Gisela was ambitious, intelligent and energetic. As "necessary companion" (necessaria comes) to her husband, she often acted authoritative and decisive in his small circle of advisors. Unlike Conrad, she was educated, thus he often entrusted her with affairs of the Church.

== Marriages and children ==
Privately, the imperial pair's relationship was also considered harmonious, although it is hard to know whether they loved each other or not. Wolfram suggests possible use of birth control, because they had no more children after they reached the age of 35. It seems there were troubles between the couple and their son Henry III. Henry at times criticized Conrad, and after Conrad's death, in a bitter quarrel, Gisela told Henry (now the only child she had left) that he would die before her.

Huschner opines that she must have loved Conrad, with whom she shared what was probably the best years of her life, ruling together at the top. The young Henry's education and development were also in accordance with her wishes. After Conrad's death, she tried to continue her previous role together with Henry III (because Henry's wife, Gunhilda of Denmark, had died), but the new emperor was vehemently against this idea, which led to conflicts between mother and son. Before 1041, she still frequented the court. After this year though, she retired to Goslar.

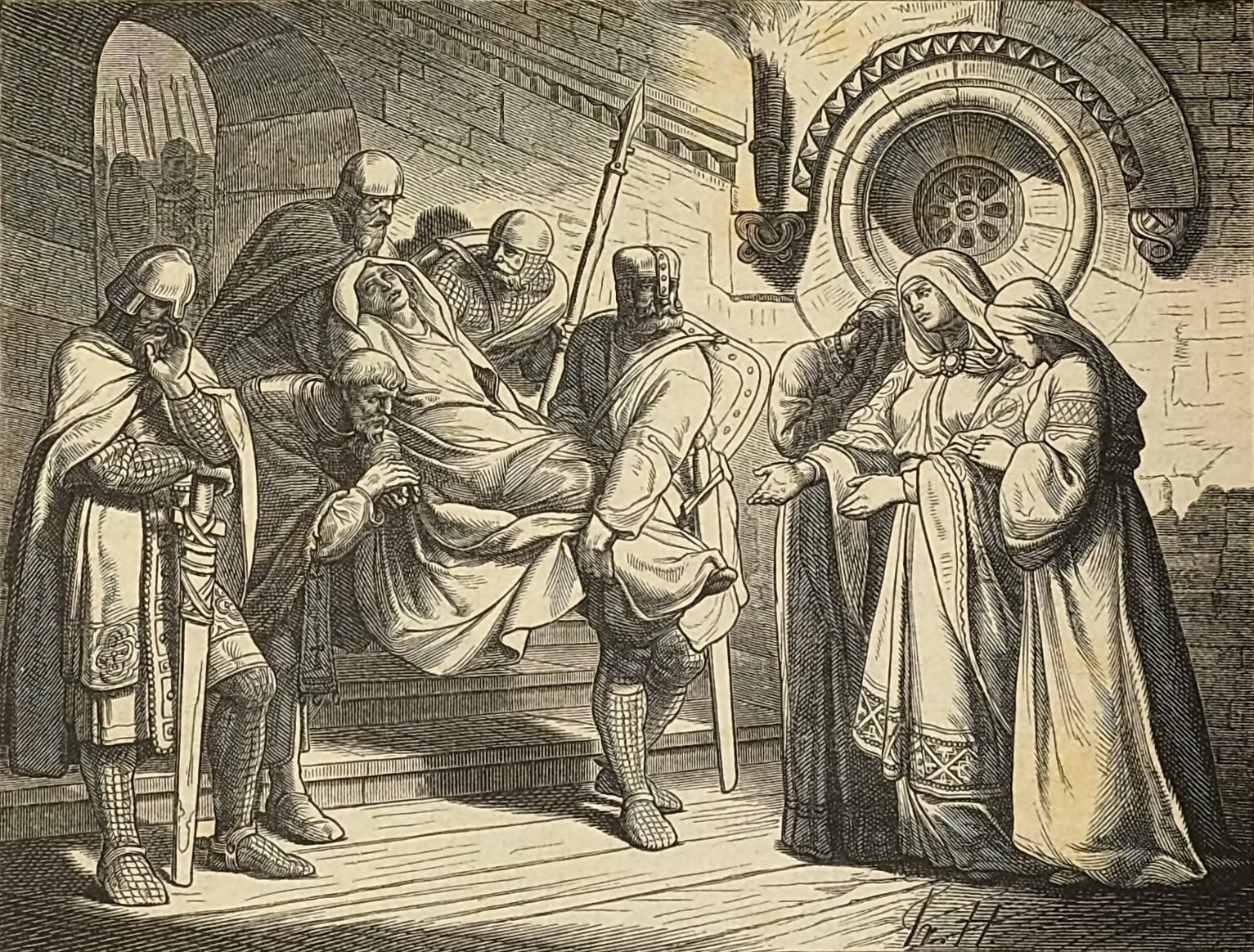
Conrad II brought back to his wife Gisela the corpse of her son Herman (Conrad II. bringt seiner Frau Gisela die Leiche ihres Sohnes Hermann zurück, Wilhelm Zimmermann's Illustrirte geschichte des deutschen volkes, 1875)

Gisela and Brun I, Count of Brunswick had:

- Liudolf, Margrave of Frisia (c. 1003 – 24 January 1038)
- Daughter (c. 1004 – ?), married Count Thiemo II of Formbach
- Gisela (c. 1005 – c. 1052), married Count Berthold of Sangerhausen

Gisela and Ernest I, Duke of Swabia had:

- Ernest II, Duke of Swabia (c. 1013 – 17 August 1030)
- Herman IV, Duke of Swabia (c. 1015 – 28 July 1038)

Gisela and Conrad II, Holy Roman Emperor had:

- Henry III, Holy Roman Emperor (28 October 1017 – 5 October 1056)
- Matilda (1027 – January 1034), betrothed to Henry I of France
- Beatrix (c. 1030 – 26 September 1036)

== Cultural depictions ==
In Germany, new studies and exhibitions on Gisela, once almost forgotten together with her husband and their family, have arisen together with the recent interest in the Salians as well as imperial women Gisela is often depicted as an ambitious, intelligent and strong-minded woman who nevertheless, was also a loyal partner to her husband, with whom she formed a harmonious team, instead of pursuing "one's own politics".

=== Historiography ===
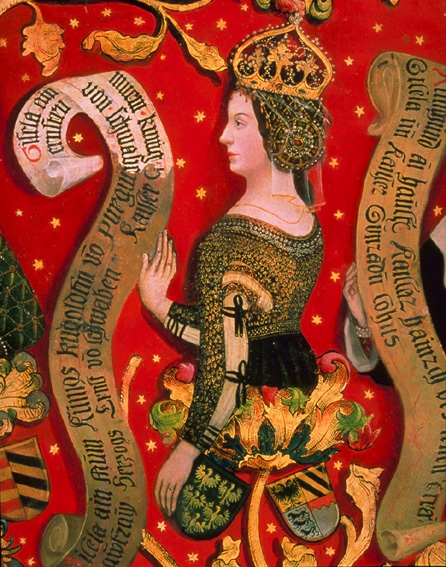
Gisela of Swabia on a panel painting. Detail from the Babenberg Family Tree painting at the Klosterneuburg Monastery Museum

The chronicler Wipo of Burgundy praised Gisela as embodying both feminine and manly qualities, as well as piety and political abilities both innate and nurtured by experience. According to Wipo, she attained her coronation thanks to her "manly probity", which won the support of the princes, the people and the emperor. She was also esteemed above all other imperial advisors.

Gisela's intercession shows the central role of herself as well as imperial consorts in general in the government. Among 191 (out of 248 diplomata, thus representing 78 percent) in which intercessors appeared, she intervened in 155 cases (85 percent), many of which together with her son, the future Henry III. Gisela was the sole intercessor in 33 diplomata. Of these, 12 of the last 14 times (issued after the couple's stay in Verona) were for Italian recipients.

Huschner opines that although she never had the chance to bear sole responsibility for the highest decisions in the government, Gisela had a significant share in royal-imperial rule and greatly contributed to the consolidation of central government, thus shaping the new dynasty. As imperatrix augusta and consors regni, she was considered co-ruler by her contemporaries (although in documents, the latter title was only used sporadically, and almost exclusively in diplomata granted to Italians—the reason for this rare use was that the previous empress, Cunigunde of Luxembourg, had failed to assert herself in the Chancellery of her husband, Henry II. Zey comments that this also shows how this title is a useful measure for gauging the influence of a queen in the government). Huschner rates her success as mediator between Conrad and Rudolph III highly, but points out that in 1033, Conrad's claim on Burgundian throne and the resulting campaign were based on imperial law (as Conrad was the successor of Emperor Henry II) rather than the inheritance right of Gisela, who did not appear in Burgundy.

She was very supportive of her relatives. Her kinsman, Archbishop Bardo of Mainz for example owed his career to her patronage. She never hesitated to choose Conrad above everyone else, including family, though.

While her role in religious matters was essential, Wolfram writes that it would be wrong to assume that Conrad neglected ecclesiastical affairs leaving Gisela as the sole originator of policies, because the medieval government was not a modern one "with Gisela functioning as the medieval equivalent of a politically appointed cabinet minister for religion and education aided by a state secretary—in this case, Poppo of Stavelot—drawn from the career civil service". Wolfram opines that the majority of Gisela's and Conrad's appointees were excellent people by intellectual standard.

Zey remarks that the role of empresses and queens as intercessors and petitioners had already been well established under the Ottonians; however, the number of times Gisela played these roles surpassed all other empresses and queens during the Middle Age. Moreover, her role as mediator between Conrad and his opponents both inside and outside the Empire was remarkable. Her power in ecclesiastical politics showed in the fact that she could appoint personally related candidates to the offices of bishop.

=== Legends ===
- There are a lot of stories told about her marriages (the men she married all had the potential to become German kings and in the end, Conrad did) and the death of the second husband Ernest (the first husband, Brun, also died an unnatural death being killed by Milo, Count of Ammensleben, in his own home). Ernest died while hunting in suspicious circumstances, being killed by an arrow of one of his retainers. He forgave his killer and supposedly warned Gisela (he was said to have the ability to predict the future) about her next marriage. There are also two accounts saying that Conrad kidnapped Gisela. Historians do not dismiss this out of hand. Wolfram says that this was possible, because Conrad might have worried that the emperor would again arrange a marriage that contradicted the Worms line's interests for Gisela, like he had done in 1512. According to Wolfram though, the two accounts undermined their own credibility by adding fanciful or inaccurate details. Secondly, Thietmar of Merseburg only criticized the marriage on the ground of close kinship rather than any violent conduct, while elsewhere he recounted such a violent kidnapping involving his own family.
- It is told that Gisela's and Conrad's first son, also named Conrad, died in Limburg (either killed when hunting or falling from the rock), so Gisela persuaded Conrad to convert the ancestral resident into holy ground. This was why on 12 July 1030, they placed the foundation stone for the Limburg Abbey, and then proceeded on horseback to the Speyer, where at noon they placed the first stone of the Speyer Cathedral.

=== Depictions in arts ===
==== Contemporary arts ====
See also: Große Adler-/Pfauenfibel Mainz

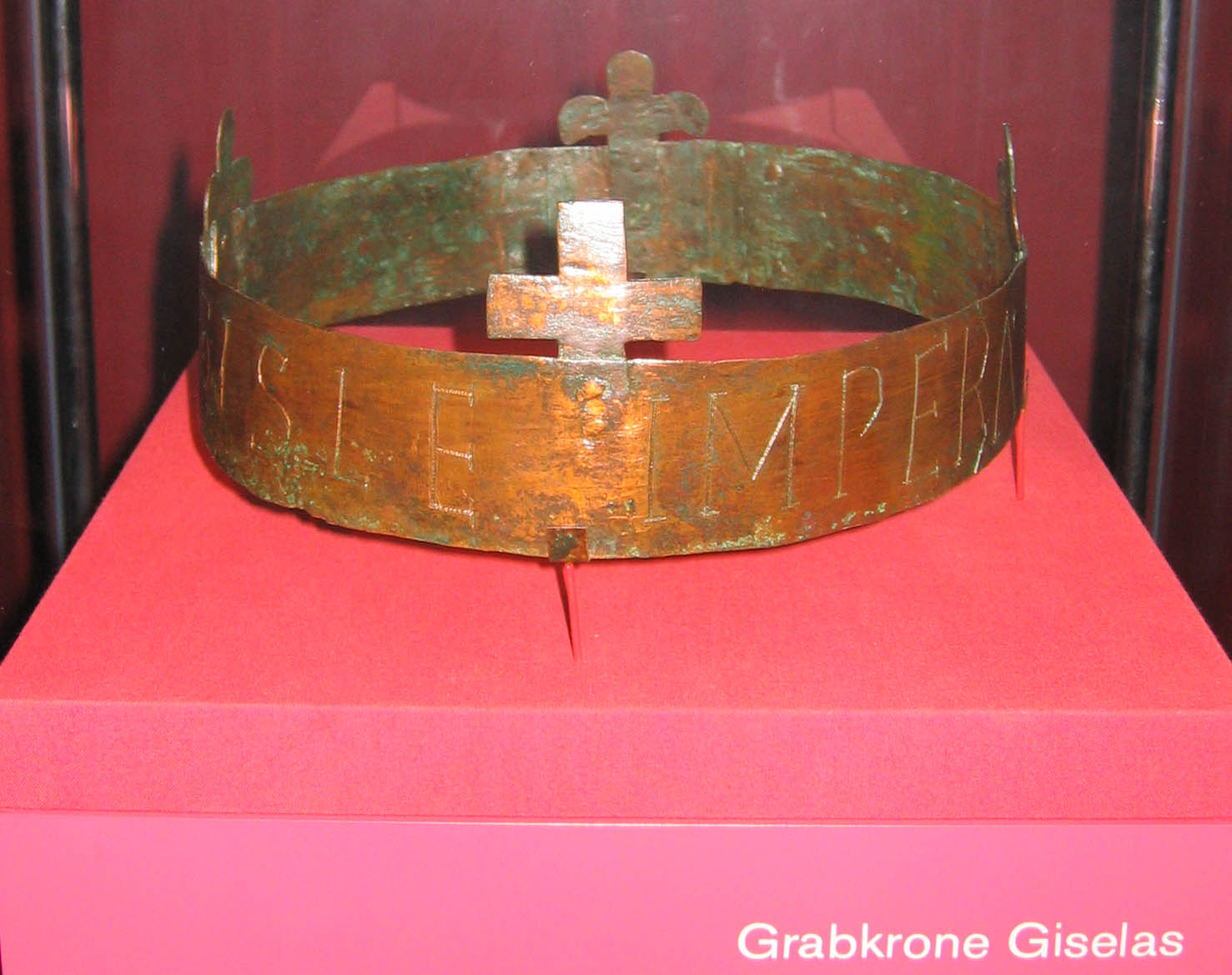
Burial crown of Gisela. The inscription reads: GISLE IMPERATRIX

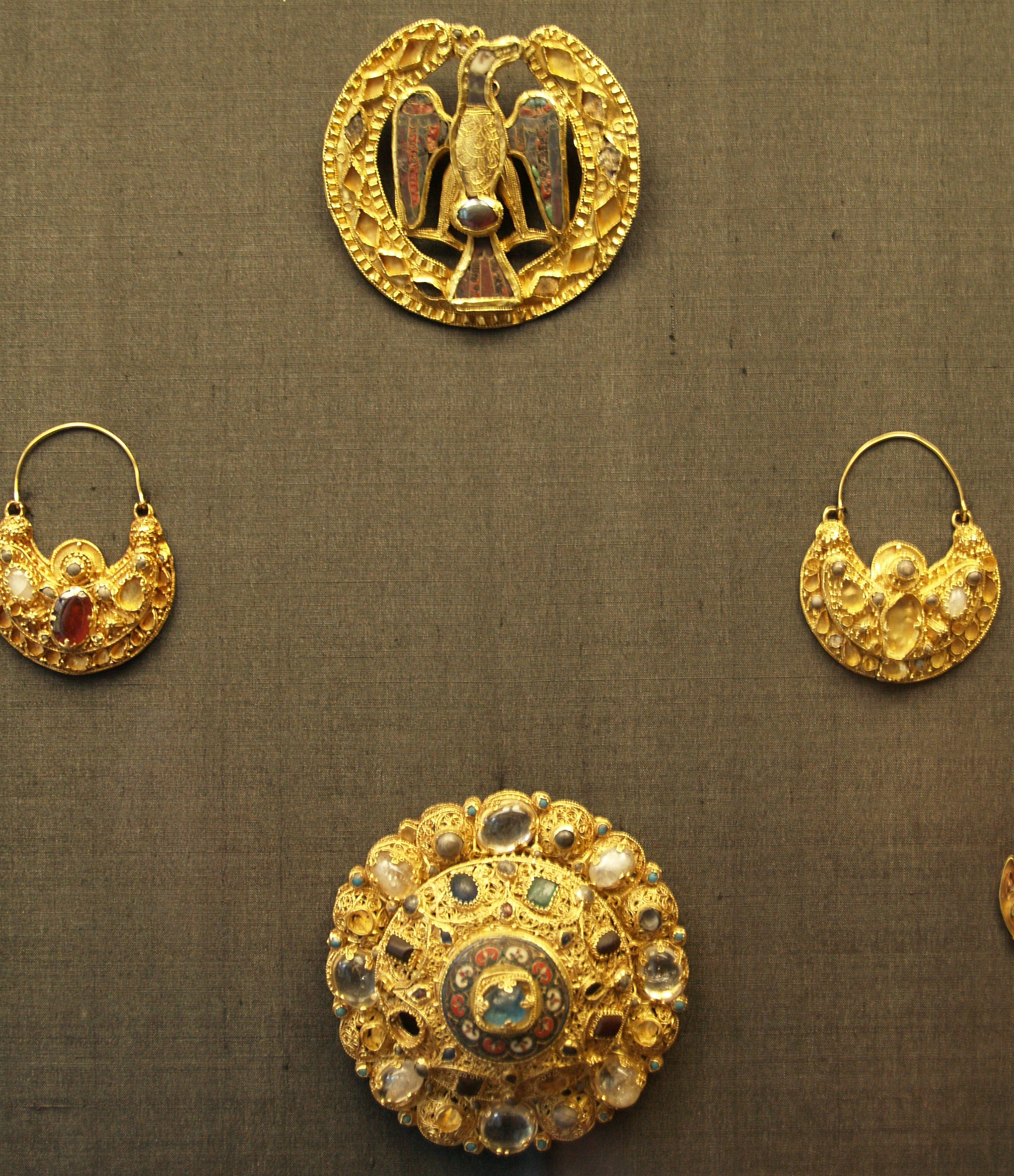
Some jewels from the Mainz treasure

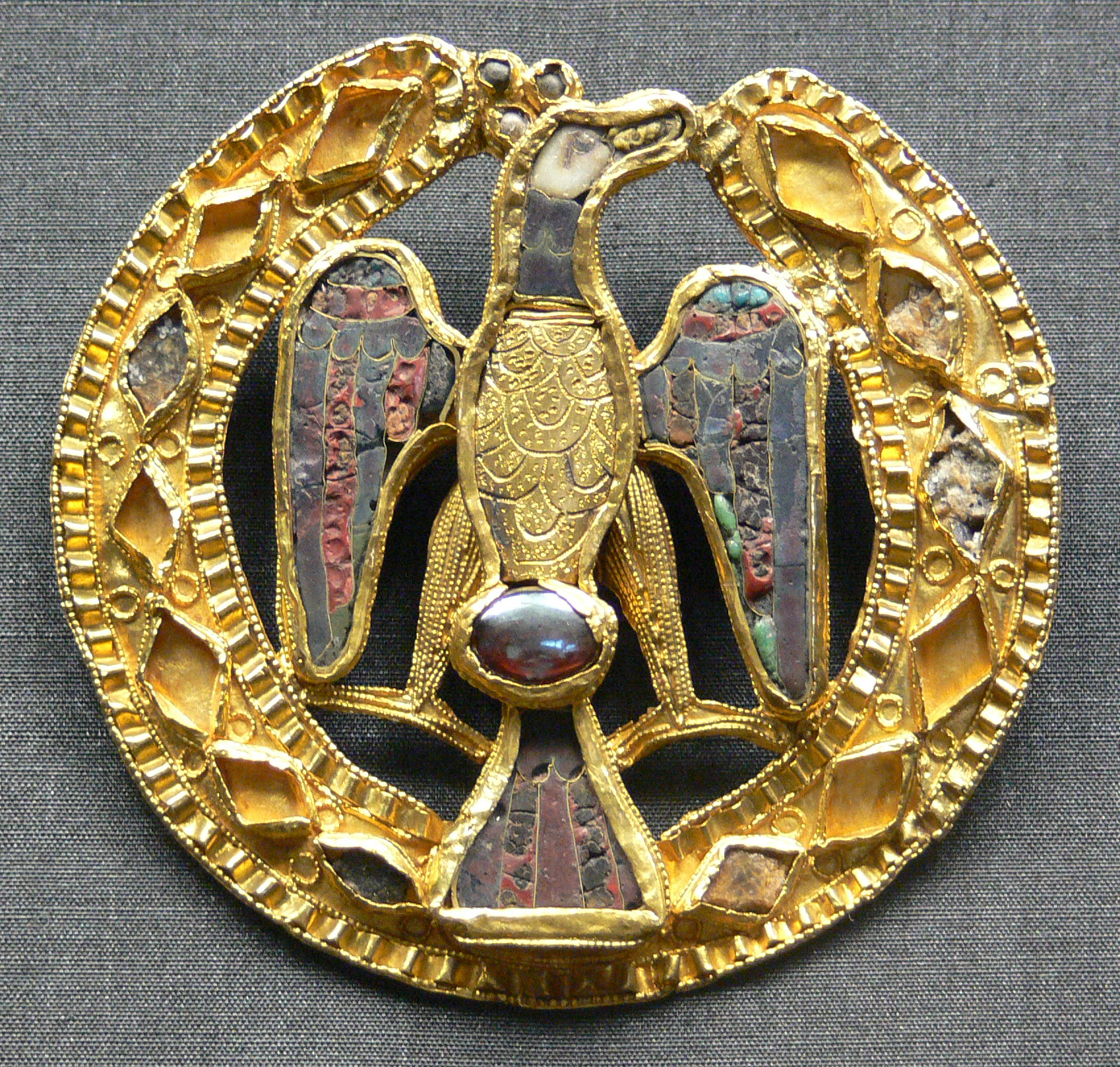
Fibula with eagle or peacock, from the Mainz treasure

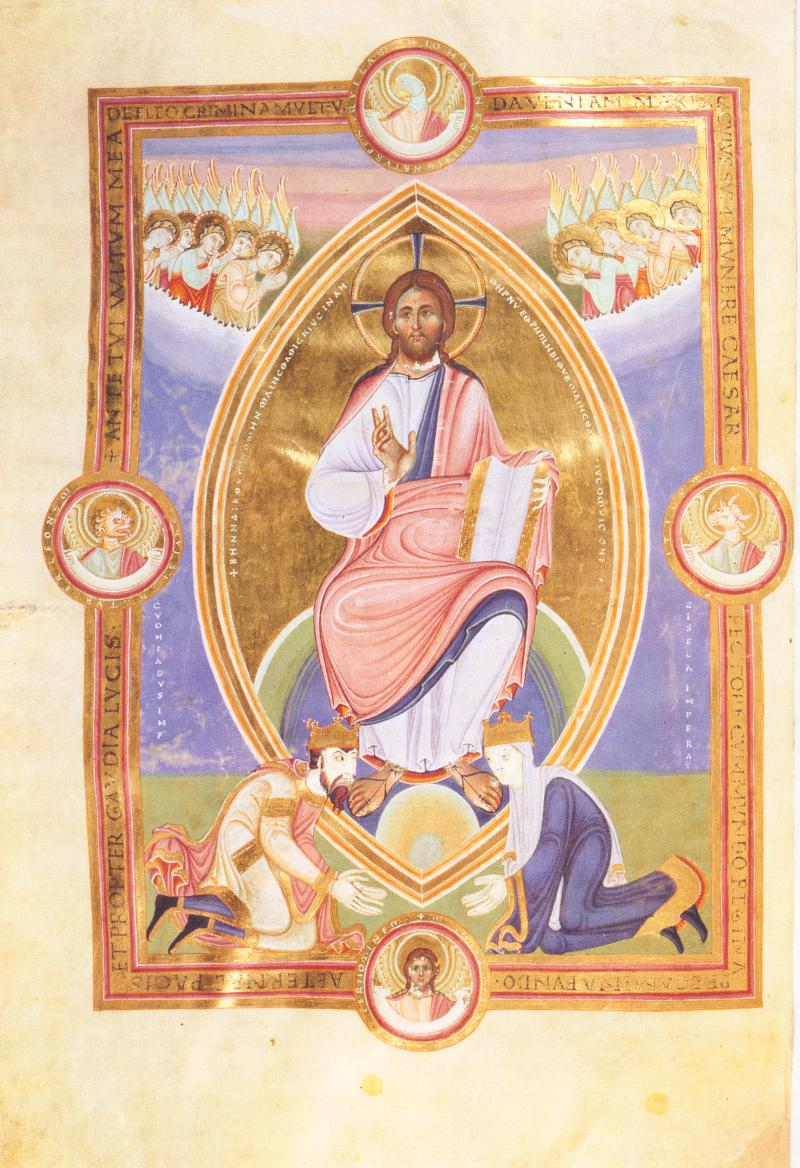
Conrad and Gisela in front of Christ in the Golden Gospels of Henry III. Cod. Vitrinas 17, El Escorial, Real Biblioteca

In 1880, a treasure of golden jewellery of 25 pieces was discovered by building workers. In 1913, Otto von Falke published this discovery and attributed it to Gisela. Since then, it has often been called "Gisela's jewels" or "Gisela's treasure". According to the Frankfurter Rundschau, the treasure is considered "the most important testimony of medieval gold jewellery". There are a lot of debates about the dates, the true origin place of the treasure and the owner though. It is generally agreed that the pieces come from different eras. In a 2017 exhibition Hessisches Landesmuseum Darmstadt, it was argued that the jewels were found in a field near Wiesbaden, with some pieces being nineteenth-century forgeries created to persuade Emperor Wilhelm II to buy them for an excessive price. Mechthild Schulze-Dörrlamm refutes these theories, claiming that the treasure is genuine and the place where they were found is Mainz, but opines that the treasure, with most of the pieces created in the eleventh century, should be associated with Agnes of Poitou, Gisela's daughter-in-law. Charles T. Little from the Metropolitan Museum of Art, relying on the date identified as late tenth century by Hiltrud Westermann-Angerhausen and Hermann Fillitz as well as Byzantine influence, linked the treasure to Theophanu. Peter Lasko suggests a date of Late Carolingian. The most notable piece was the fibula with the eagle (or peacock) shape. Its authenticity has never been doubted, but the latest investigations have also failed to establish a clear date. Birgit Heide opines that the date was either much earlier than the assumed date of the second half of the ninth century (thus Late Carolingian), or between 975 and 1025.

The Golden Gospels of Henry III, commissioned by Henry III, honours himself as well as his mother. An image showing Gisela and Conrad before Christ (fol. 2v) is noted. The couple is depicted as ruling partners, both with crowns, receiving divine blessings and associated with divine figures through adornment, and the colours of their clothing matched (these characteristics are also applied in the portrayal of Henry III and Agnes of Poitou. The tears of Conrad are shown, reminding of a previous argument between father and son, in which Conrad is said to have wept and collapsed (Henry III considered his behaviour justified, and this image seems to show this too).

==== Later depictions ====
===== Sculpture =====
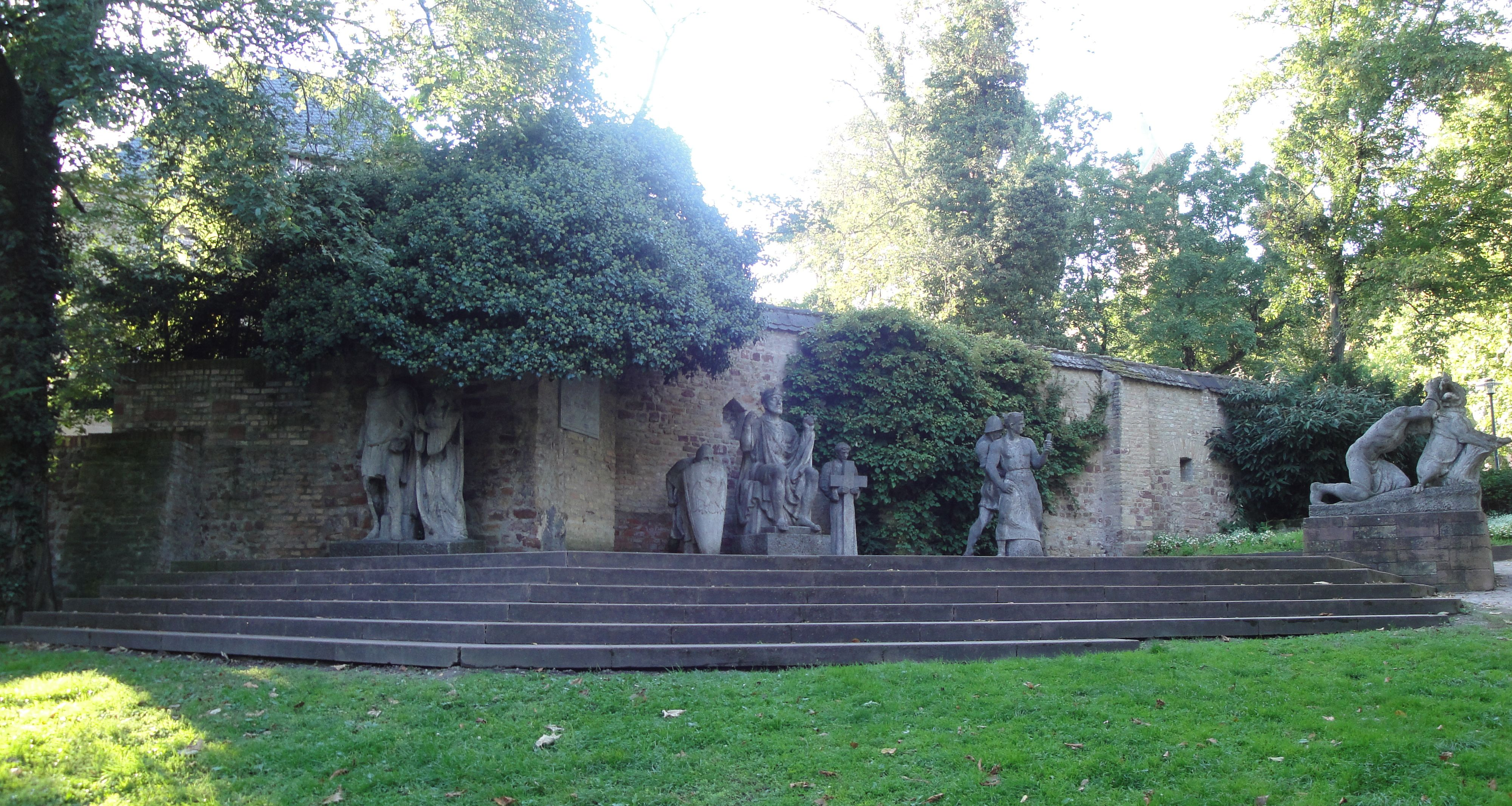
Salian statues in Speyer (Conrad and Gisela on the left)

- In Speyer, there are a group of statues representing the Salians (Gisela, Conrad II, Henry III, Henry IV, Henry V and secondary figures, created around 1930–1940 by Ludwig Cauer (sculptor, born 1866 in Bad Kreuznach, died 1947 in Bad Kreuznach) and commissioned by Wilhelm Frick, Reich Minister of the Interior.

There are also statues of Conrad, Gisela, Henry III, Henry IV and Bertha in the Kaiser-Halle of the cathedral, erected in the nineteenth century.

===== Prose =====
- Gottlob Heinrich Heinse (1766–1853) wrote the two-volume Ida von Schwaben. Enkelin der Kaiserin Gisela about Ida von Elsdorf, here Ernest II's daughter. Ida was a possible granddaughter to Gisela through Ernest or through Liudolf, Margrave of Frisia.
- Die Herrin der Kathedrale is a 2013 novel by Claudia and Nadja Beinert about Uta von Naumburg, who was educated in the Gernrode convent before becoming a lady-in-waiting to Empress Gisela, who became her role model as a strong woman. She had to leave the imperial couple to marry Ekkehard von Meißen, whom she did not love. Despite this, she found consolation in a platonic relationship with her brother-in-law Hermann and their common project to build a cathedral in Naumburg.

===== Theater =====
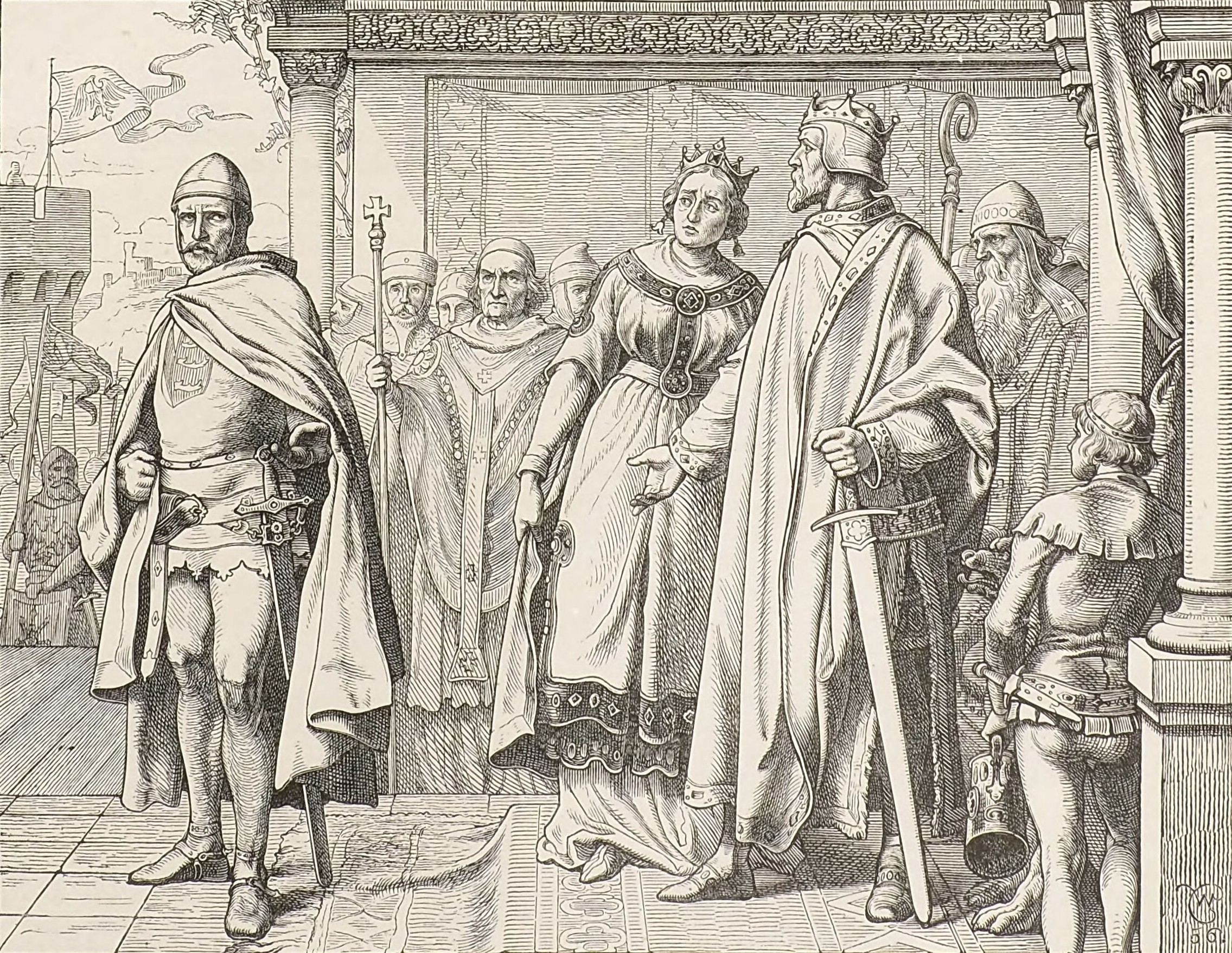
Ernest II, Gisela and Conrad II in Ingelheim. Engraving by Wilhelm Camphausen (MeisterDrucke-467217)

- In 1818, August von Kotzebue wrote the four-act Gisela. The main characters included Gisela, her husband Conrad the Older, and Conrad the Younger.
- The 1818 trauerspiel Ernst, Herzog von Schwaben, written by Ludwig Uhland is the first work exploring Gisela's inner conflict between motherly love towards Ernest and her roles as Conrad's wife and ruler.
- In 1867, Albert Dulk published the six-act Konrad der Zweite, which describes the story of Conrad, Gisela, her sons Ernest and Henry, Ernest's wife Agnes.

=== Commemoration ===
Gisela is one of the five empresses (together with Adelaide of Italy, Theophanu, Cunigunde of Luxembourg and Agnes of Poitou), presented as Säulen der Macht (pillars of power), commemorated by the city of Ingelheim am Rhein. There are six stelae at the Heidesheim Gate (Heidesheimer Tor) displaying their lives and work. All five empresses once stayed at the Kaiserpfalz (imperial residence) in Ingelheim.

== Bibliography and further reading ==
- Braunschweigisches Biographisches Lexikon, Appelhans 2006, ISBN 3-937664-46-7
- Brandenburg, Erich (1928). Probleme um die Kaiserin Gisela.
- NDB biography of Gisela
- Huschner, Wolfgang (1990). "Kaiserin Gisela: Klügste Beraterin Konrads II.". In Uitz, Erika (ed.). Herrscherinnen und Nonnen: Frauengestalten von der Ottonenzeit bis zu den Staufern (in German). Deutscher Verlag der Wissenschaften. p. 127. ISBN 978-3-326-00565-2.
- Falke, Otto von; Kunstwissenschaft, Deutscher Verein für (1913). Der Mainzer Goldschmuck der Kaiserin Gisela (in German). In Kommission der Verlags für Kunstwissenschaft.
- Ennen, Edith (1994). Frauen im Mittelalter (in German). C.H. Beck. ISBN 978-3-406-37799-0.
- Foerster, Anne (2018). Die Witwe des Königs zu Vorstellung, Anspruch und Performanz im englischen und deutschen Hochmittelalter. Ostfildern: Jan Thorbecke Verlag. ISBN 978-3799543767.
- Zey, Claudia (2008). "Frauen und Töchter der salischen Herrscher". In Struve, Tilman (ed.). Die Salier, das Reich und der Niederrhein (PDF) (in German). Böhlau. pp. 52, 53. ISBN 978-3-412-20201-9.
- Wolfram, Herwig (1 November 2010). Conrad II, 990-1039: Emperor of Three Kingdoms. Penn State Press. p. 367. ISBN 978-0-271-04818-5.
- Boshof, Egon (2008). Die Salier (in German). W. Kohlhammer Verlag. p. 312. ISBN 978-3-17-020183-5.
- Weinfurter, Stefan (1999). The Salian Century: Main Currents in an Age of Transition. University of Pennsylvania Press. p. 16. ISBN 978-0-8122-3508-1.
- Kagay, Donald Joseph; Villalon, L. J. Andrew, eds. (2003). Crusaders, Condottieri, and Cannon: Medieval Warfare in Societies around the Mediterranean. Koninklijke Brill NV.
- Nash, Penelope (2017). Empress Adelheid and Countess Matilda: Medieval Female Rulership and the Foundations of European Society. Palgrave Macmillan.
- "Women in power 1000–1100" from Guide2womenleaders.com, last accessed January 15, 2007

Gisela of Swabia Conradines Born: 11 November 989 or 990 Died: 14 February 1043
German royalty
Preceded by Cunigunde of Luxembourg	Queen consort of Germany; 1024–1028	Succeeded by Gunhilda of Denmark
Preceded by Cunigunde of Luxembourg	Holy Roman Empress; 1027–1039	Succeeded by Agnes of Poitou
Preceded by Ermengarde of Savoy	Queen consort of Burgundy; 1032–1038	Succeeded by Agnes of Poitou
