= Matilda of Franconia =

- Born: c. 1027
- Died: January 1034
- Burial: Worms Cathedral
- House: Salian dynasty
- Father: Conrad II, Holy Roman Emperor
- Mother: Gisela of Swabia

Matilda of Franconia (c. 1027 – 1034) was a daughter of Emperor Conrad II and Gisela of Swabia from the Salian dynasty. Matilda’s elder brother was Henry III, Holy Roman Emperor.

At a meeting with King Henry I of France in Deville in Lorraine in May 1033, Conrad agreed to marry five-year-old Matilda to Henry. However, before she could marry, she died in early 1034. Her marriage was arranged to confirm a peace compact agreed between Henry and Conrad.

She was buried in Worms Cathedral.

Conrad’s chaplain Wipo of Burgundy mentioned Matilda as filia imperatoris Chuonradi et Giselæ, Mahthilda.

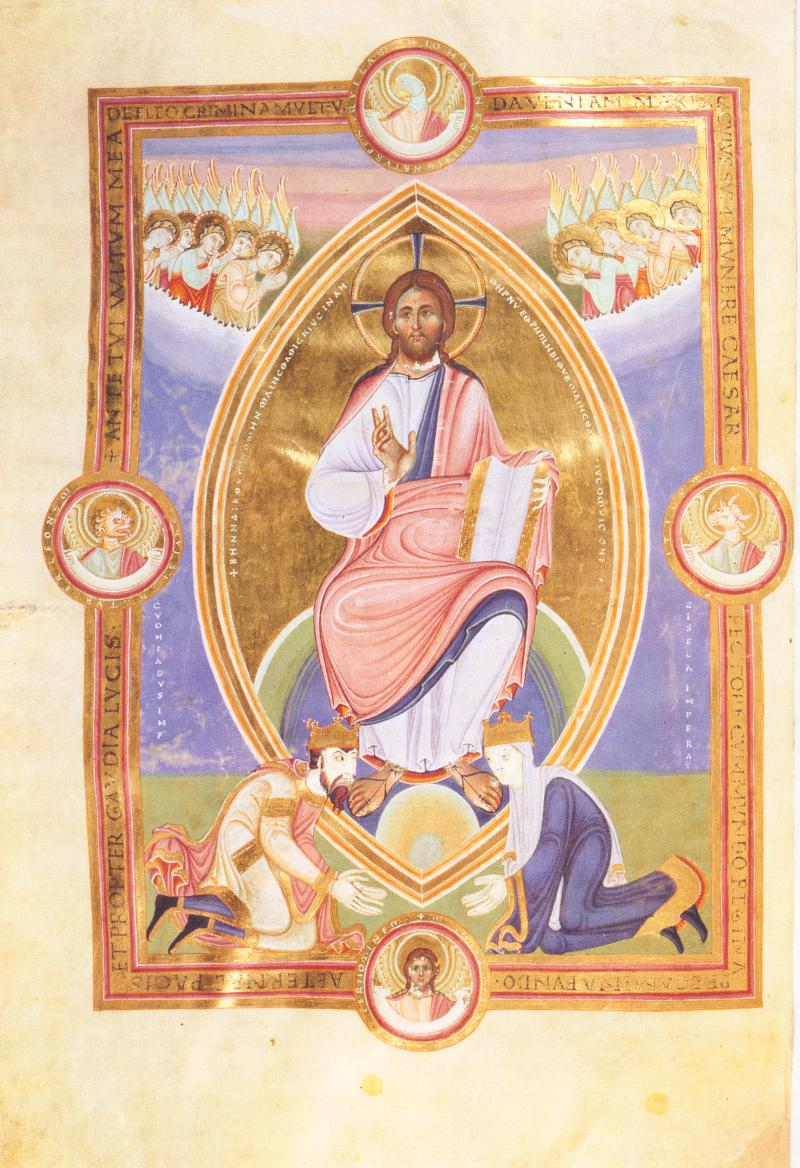
Matilda’s parents Conrad and Gisela are depicted here kneeling before Christ in Majesty
