= Egbert I of Meissen =

Margrave of Meissen from 1067 to 1068

Egbert I
- Margrave of Meissen
- Died: 11 January 1068
- Noble family: Brunonen
- Spouse: Immilla of Turin
- Issue: Egbert II; Gertrude
- Father: Liudolf, Margrave of Frisia
- Mother: Gertrude of Egisheim-Dagsburg

Egbert I (German: Ekbert) (died 11 January 1068) was the Margrave of Meissen from 1067 until his early death the next year. Egbert was the Count of Brunswick from about 1038, when his father, Liudolf, Margrave of Frisia, died.

Egbert was the scion of the influential Eastphalian family of the Brunonen. He inherited the familial lands in Brunswick and from about 1051 he shared the chief authority in the region with the Bishop of Hildesheim. Egbert also extended his authority and estates into Frisia under the suzerainty of the Archbishop of Hamburg-Bremen.

Although closely related to the Salian dynasty, Egbert participated in the coup d'état of Kaiserswerth in 1062, whereat a group of nobles acting under Anno II, Archbishop of Cologne, tried to seize authority in the kingdom from King Henry IV and his regent mother, the Empress Agnes.

In 1058, Egbert married Immilla, the daughter of Ulric Manfred II of Turin, and widow of Otto of Schweinfurt. Egbert tried to repudiate Immilla shortly before his death in 1068. His only son, Egbert II, succeeded him in Meissen. His daughter Gertrude later brought Meissen to her husband, Henry von Eilenburg.

== Sources ==
- Flathe. "Ekbert I." Deutsche Biographie. Allgemeine Deutsche Biographie 5.

Egbert I of Meissen Brunonen Died: 11 January 1068
Preceded by Otto I	Margrave of Meissen; 1067–1068	Succeeded by Egbert II
