= Liudolf, Margrave of Frisia =

11th Century Margrave of Frisia

Liudolf
- Margrave of Frisia; Count of Brunswick
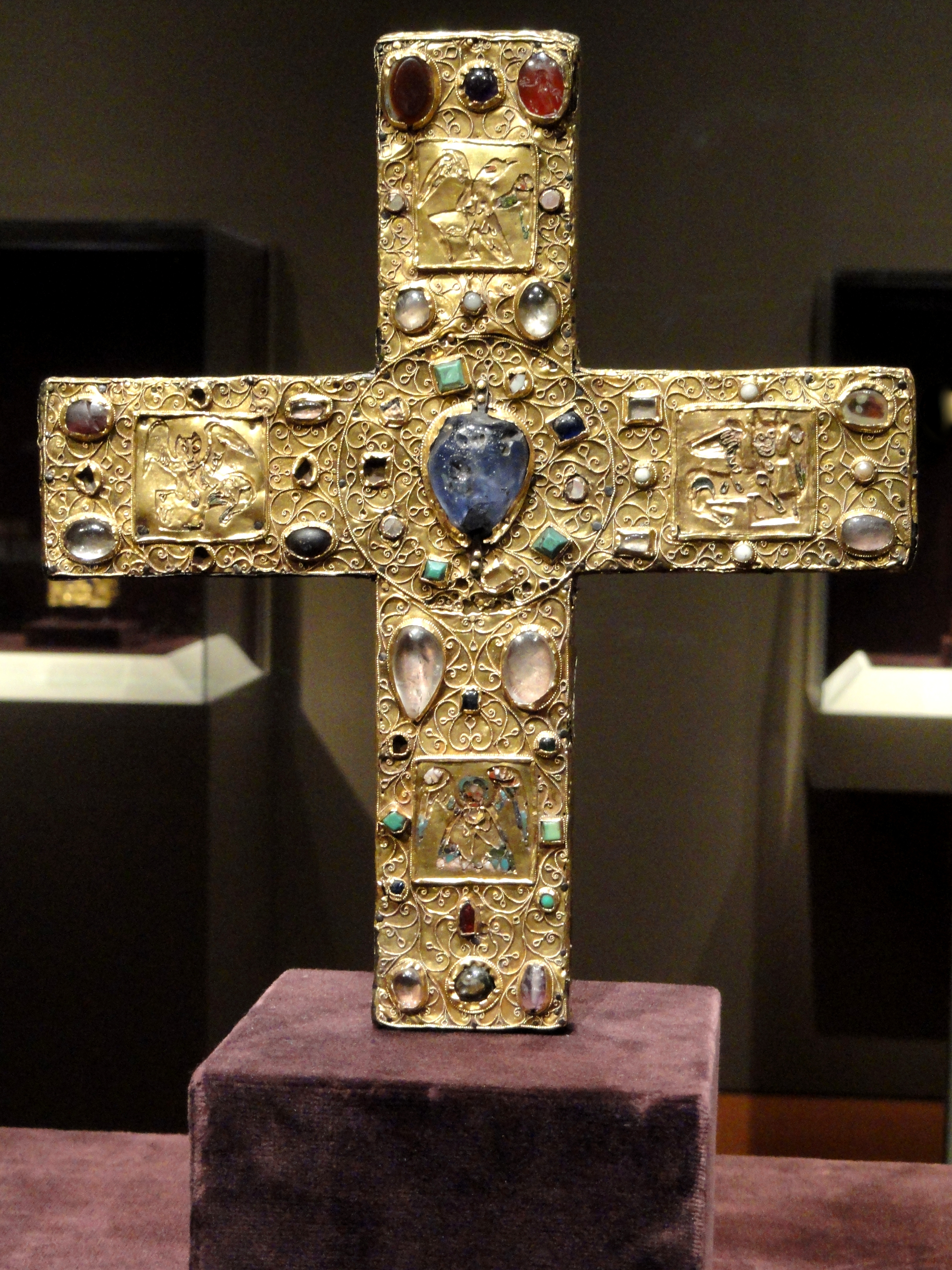
- Ceremonial Cross for Liudolf of Brunswick, commissioned by his wife shortly after his death in 1038
- Born: 11 October 1003
- Died: 23 April 1038 (aged 34–35)
- Noble family: Brunonen
- Spouse: Gertrude of Egisheim
- Issue: Brun II; Egbert I, Margrave of Meissen; Matilda of Frisia; Ida of Elsdorf
- Father: Bruno I, Count of Brunswick
- Mother: Gisela of Swabia

Liudolf of Brunswick (c. 1003 – 23 April 1038) was Margrave of Frisia, Count of Brunswick, Count in the Derlingau and the Gudingau.

Liudolf was a descendant of the Saxon family of the Brunonen. He was a son of Bruno I, Count of Brunswick, and Gisela of Swabia. After the death of his father, Liudolf's mother remarried several times, her last marriage was to Conrad II, Holy Roman Emperor. Therefore, Holy Roman Emperor Henry III was his younger half-brother. Liudolf married Gertrude of Egisheim and had four children. He controlled the Frisian counties Oostergo, Zuidergo and Westergo. For two more generations the Brunonen family line inherited the title. How the Brunonen came to their position in the counties is not known. There is a theory that Liudolf took advantage of the reign of violence by the Counts of Holland in the part of Friesland between the Vlie and the Lauwers. Not much is known about his life. He died in 1038 and was succeeded by his son, Bruno II.

== Family ==
Liudolf and Gertrude of Egisheim had the following children:

- Bruno II (around 1024 – 26 June 1057)
- Egbert I, Margrave of Meissen (died 1068)
- Matilda of Frisia (died 1044); married King Henry I of France.
- Ida of Elsdorf, married to Leopold (Luitpold, Lippold) of Babenberg †1043 Hungarian March. Their daughter Oda of Stade married Sviatoslav II Yaroslavich, Grand Prince of Kiev.
- (possibly) Agatha, wife of Edward the Exile, of the royal family of England, the mother of Edgar the Ætheling and Saint Margaret of Scotland.

== Bibliography ==
- Bautier, Robert-Henri (1985). "Anne de Kiev, Reine de France, et la Politique Royale au XI E SIÈCLE: Étude Critique De La Documentation". Revue des Études Slaves. 57 (4). Institut d'études slaves: 539–564. doi:10.3406/slave.1985.5520.
- Halbertsma, Herrius (2000). Frieslands oudheid: het rijk van de Friese koningen, opkomst en ondergang [Frieslands antiquity, Realm of the Frisian kings, rise and fall] (in Dutch and English) (New ed.). Utrecht: Matrijs. ISBN 9789053451670.
- Keene, Catherine (2013). Saint Margaret, Queen of the Scots: A Life in Perspective. Palgrave Macmillan.
- de Vajay, Szabolcs (1962). "Agatha, Mother St. Margaret, Queen of Scotland". Duquesne Review. 7 (2 (Spring)): 71–80.
- Die familiären Verbindungen der Brunonen
- Liudolf Graf von Braunschweig
- Braunschweigisches Biographisches Lexikon, Appelhans 2006, ISBN 3-937664-46-7
- Mladjov, "Reconsidering Agatha, Wife of Eadward the Exile". The Plantagenet Connection 11 (2003). p. 1–85.
