= Conrad I of Burgundy =

King of Burgundy from 937 to 993

Conrad I
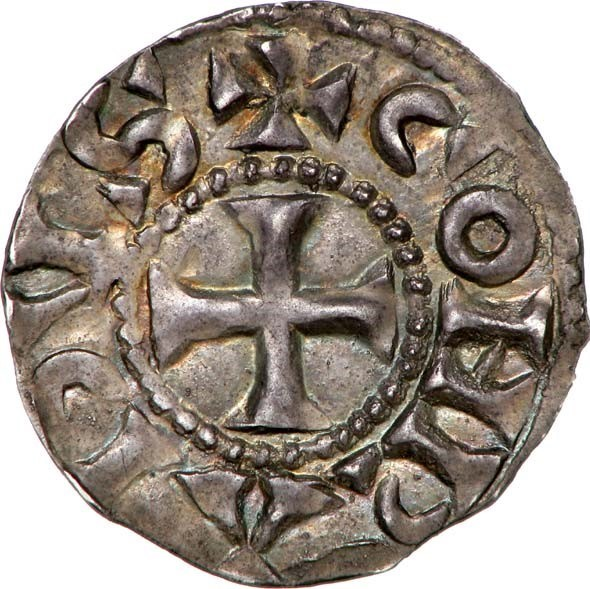
- Denier minted in the name of Conrad I

King of Burgundy
- Reign: 11 July 937 – 19 October 993
- Predecessor: Rudolph II
- Successor: Rudolph III
- Born: c. 925
- Died: 19 October 993 (aged 67 or 68)
- Burial: Vienne
- Spouses: Adelaide of Bellay; Matilda of France
- Issue: Gisela, Duchess of Bavaria; Bertha, Queen of France; Rudolph III of Burgundy; Gerberga, Duchess of Swabia
- House: Elder House of Welf
- Father: Rudolph II of Burgundy
- Mother: Bertha of Swabia

Conrad I, called the Peaceful (French: Conrad le Pacifique; German: Konrad der Friedfertige; Latin: Conradus; c. 925 – 19 October 993), was King of Burgundy (ruling a political unit also called the Kingdom of Arles) from 937 until his death in 993.

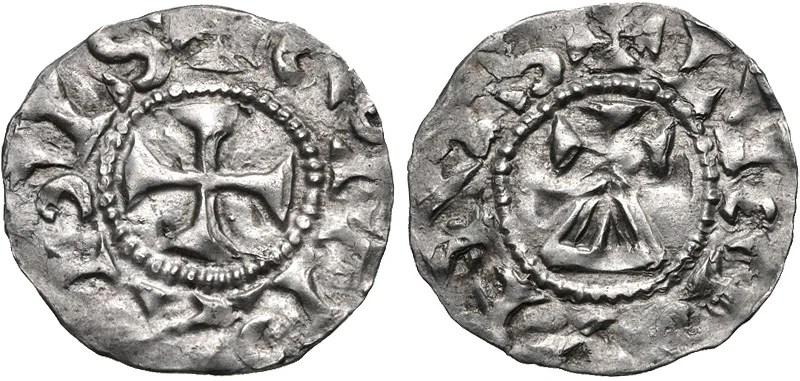
Denier of Conrad, with cross pattée and tower surmounted by cross, with Latin text CONRADVS and LUCDVNVS (Lyon).

== Life ==
A member of the Elder House of Welf, Conrad was the son of King Rudolph II, the first ruler over the united kingdom of Upper and Lower Burgundy since 933, and his consort Bertha, a daughter of Duke Burchard II of Swabia. Some sources call him Conrad III, since he was the third Conrad in his family: his great-grandfather was Duke Conrad II, whose father was Count Conrad I.

Conrad succeeded his father as King of Burgundy in 937, with his future brother-in-law, the German king Otto I (later Holy Roman Emperor), exercising the regency during Conrad's minority reign. Under Otto's regency, Conrad began a close collaboration with the Germanic kings. Burgundy also gained a central role in Otto I's Italian policy due to the Great Saint Bernard Pass. Conrad extended Burgundy's control over important monasteries, including Lure Abbey, Payerne Priory, Romainmôtier Priory and Moutier-Grandval Abbey.

According to the chronicler Ekkehard IV, in a story that is probably apocryphal, when Conrad learned that both the Magyars and the Arabs of Fraxinetum were marching against him, he sent envoys to both armies warning them of the other. The envoys offered Burgundian aid to each invader against the other and then informed them of the other's whereabouts. When the Magyars and Saracens met, the Burgundians held back and only attacked when the opposing forces were spent. In this way, both invading armies were destroyed and the captives sold into slavery. Conrad died on 19 October 993 and was buried at the Abbey of Saint-André-le-Bas, Vienne.

== Marriage and children ==
Conrad married firstly, Adelaide of Bellay. They were parents to at least one daughter:

- Gisela (d. 21 July 1006), married Henry II, Duke of Bavaria

He married Matilda by 966, daughter of Louis IV of France and Gerberga of Saxony. They had at least four children:

- Bertha (964 – 16 January 1016), married Odo I, Count of Blois, and then Robert II of France
- Matilda (born 969), possibly married Robert, Count of Geneva
- Rudolph III, King of Burgundy (971 – 6 September 1032)
- Gerberga (born 965), married Herman II, Duke of Swabia

By his concubine, Aldiud, he had a son:

- Burchard, Archbishop of Lyons

== Sources ==
- Bourchard, Constance Brittain (1999). "Burgundy and Provence, 879–1032". In Reuter, Timothy; McKitterick, Rosamond (eds.). The New Cambridge Medieval History: Volume 3, c.900-c.1024. Cambridge University Press.
- Cope, Christopher (1987). Phoenix Frustrated: The Lost Kingdom of Burgundy. Constable.
- Fichtenau, Heinrich (1991). Living in the Tenth Century: Mentalities and Social Orders. Translated by Geary, Patrick J. University of Chicago Press.
- Poole, Reginald L. (1911). "Burgundian Notes". The English Historical Review. 26 (102).
- Previté-Orton, C. W. (1912). Early History of the House of Savoy. Cambridge University Press.
- Reuter, Timothy; McKitterick, Rosamond, eds. (1999). "Appendix". The New Cambridge Medieval History: Volume 3, c.900-c.1024. Cambridge University Press.

Conrad I of Burgundy Elder House of Welf Born: c. 925 Died: 19 October 993
Regnal titles
Preceded by Rudolph II	King of Burgundy; 937–993	Succeeded by Rudolph III
