= Herman II of Swabia =

German noble (died 1003)

Herman II, Duke of Swabia
- Died: 4 May 1003
- Noble family: Conradines
- Spouse: Gerberga of Burgundy
- Issue: Gisela; Matilda; Herman III
- Father: Conrad I, Duke of Swabia

Herman II (German: Hermann II.; died 4 May 1003) was a member of the Conradine dynasty. He was Duke of Swabia from 997 to his death. In 1002, Herman unsuccessfully attempted to become king of Germany.

== Life ==
Herman II was the son of Conrad I. There is, however, some debate about the identity of Herman's mother. She is often said to be Reglint (or Richlind), daughter of Liudolf, Duke of Swabia, and thus a granddaughter of Emperor Otto I. Others argue that his mother was Judith, daughter of Adalbert of Marchtal (also known as Judith of Öhningen).

In 997, after Conrad I's death, Herman II succeeded his father as duke of Swabia. That same year, Herman II accompanied Emperor Otto III on his second Italian campaign.

=== Candidacy for the German throne ===
When Otto III died without heirs in January 1002, Herman II was one of the men, along with Henry II and Eckard of Meissen, who promoted themselves as candidates for the German throne. Both Herman II and Henry II claimed descent from Henry the Fowler, progenitor of the Ottonian dynasty. Eckard, though a powerful noble and military leader, was more distantly related to the Ottonians. Eckhard was assassinated in April 1002 by Saxons who opposed his candidacy. According to the chronicler Thietmar of Merseburg, the majority of the German nobles, who assembled at Aachen in April 1002, including the influential Archbishop Heribert of Cologne, supported Herman II. But his rival, Henry II, did not wait for the approval of the nobles. Instead, he had himself anointed and crowned king by Archbishop Willigis of Mainz on 7 June 1002. (Herman had tried, and failed, to prevent Henry II from reaching Mainz.) Herman initially refused to accept Henry II as king. He undertook military action against Henry and his supporters, including at Strasbourg, where Herman's men looted the episcopal church. Yet by October 1002, Herman II undertook a ritual act of submission (deditio) before Henry II at Bruchsal. Herman accepted Henry's kingship and promised to make reparation for the damage that had been inflicted on Strasbourg. In Christmas 1002, Herman was present at the imperial court at Frankfurt, signalling that he was on better terms with Henry II. In January 1003, Henry II required Herman to cede control of the female monastery St Stephen in Strasbourg to Bishop Werner of Strasbourg.

=== Marriage and children ===
He married Gerberga of Burgundy, daughter of King Conrad of Burgundy. With Gerberga, Herman had three children:

- Gisela who was the wife of Emperor Conrad II
- Matilda of Swabia who was the wife of Frederick II, Duke of Upper Lorraine
- Herman III, Duke of Swabia
- Beatrice (?) (died after 25 February 1025), who was married to Adalbert of Eppenstein.

== Death ==
Shortly after he ceded control of a female monastery in Strasbourg, on 4 May 1003, Herman died. Contemporaries saw his death as a divine punishment for his desecration of the episcopal church at Strasbourg. After Herman died, Henry II separated Alsace from Swabia and took control of the duchy. This situation continued through the reign of Herman's son and successor, Herman III, for whom Henry II acted as guardian during his minority.

== Notes ==
Herman II of Swabia Conradines Died: 4 May 1003
Preceded by Conrad I	Duke of Swabia; 997–1003	Succeeded by Herman III
