= Duke of the Franks =

Important title in medieval Western Europe

The title Duke (and Prince) of the Franks (Latin: dux (et princeps) Francorum) has been used for three different offices, always with "duke" implying military command and "prince" implying something approaching sovereign or regalian rights. The term "Franks" may refer to an ethnic group or to the inhabitants of a territory called Francia.

The first office was that of the mayors of the palace of the Merovingian kings of the Franks, whose powers increased as those of the kings declined. The second was that of the second-in-command to the early kings of France, the last incumbent of which succeeded to the throne in 987. This title was sometimes rendered as Duke of France (dux Franciae). The third instance was that of the rulers in East Francia (now Germany) of the so-called "tribal" duchy of Franconia.

== Dux et princeps Francorum ==
Up until the time after Dagobert I, the title princeps (prince) had royal connotations. The first time it was used to describe the mayors of the palace of Neustria was in mid-7th-century saints' lives. The Vita Eligii refers to unspecified principes of the palatium of Neustria, and the Vita Baldechildis and Passio Leudegarii describe the mayors Erchinoald and Ebroin as princes. Pippin II first used the title princeps after his victory at the Battle of Tertry in 687. Both the Liber historiae Francorum and the Vita Dagoberti tertii refer to him by this title, but the continuation of the Chronicle of Fredegar uses only the title "duke". The historian Bede refers to Pippin II as dux Francorum, but the ninth-century Anglo-Saxon translator of Bede uses the term Froncna cyning (king of the Franks). The continuator of Fredegar refers to Ragamfred as a prince, but he only calls his rival, Pippin's son Charles Martel, a prince after his victory over Ragamfred in 718. The princely title was used continuously from this point on for Charles and his descendants, the Carolingians, both in narrative and charter sources.

In 742, Pippin's grandson, Carloman, held his great Concilium Germanicum, at which he addressed the assembled "servants of God and my great men ... who are in my kingdom" as "duke and prince of the Franks". The council declared that "without the patronage of the prince of the Franks it is impossible to defend the people of the church, the presbyters, clerics, monks and nuns of God." When in 744 Carloman's brother, Pippin III, used the same title, he did not refer to "my kingdom", since by then a Merovingian king, Childeric III, had been appointed. The ducal/princely title used by the early Carolingians marked them off as peers of the duke–princes of Aquitaine, also nominally under the Merovingians, rather than as sovereigns over them.

== Dux Franciae ==
A charter from the reign of King Odo (888–898) for the church Saint-Aignan d'Orléans that titles Robert the Strong dux Francorum is a 17th-century forgery.

Between 936 and 943, the title dux Francorum was revived at the request of Hugh the Great, the most powerful magnate in France. A charter of King Louis IV of 936 refers to him that way, and a charter of Hugh's own from 937 employs the title. Its usage was not exclusive, however, since the title "count" (comes) continued to be used as well. In one charter, Louis explained that Hugh was second to him in all his kingdoms. This interpretation of the title dux Francorum was not universally accepted. According to Flodoard of Reims, the king only "invested Hugh with the duchy of France" in 943 in reward for the latter's help in returning the king from exile. The duchy of Francia (ducatus Franciae) comprised the region between the Loire and the Seine, the ancient kingdom of Neustria. On this contemporary understanding, Hugh's title was analogous to that of the dukes of Aquitaine, dux Aquitanorum, where the territorial designation ("of Aquitaine") was eschewed in favour of an ethnic one ("of the Aquitainians"). "Duke of the Franks" thus became the preferred title of the Robertian margraves of Neustria from 943. Walther Kienast suggested that the title served to connect Hugh with the previous duces Francorum, Pippin II and Charles Martel, and buttress his authority in Francia, from which he was frequently absent on visits to the royal court.

Hugh died in 956 and was succeeded by his son and heir, the child Hugh Capet. In 960, according to Flodoard, "the king [Lothair] made Hugh [Capet] a duke, and added for him the country of Poitou to the land which his father had held." The younger Hugh's first charter with the ducal title dates to 966, while the first royal charter with the title dates to 974. Lothair son, Louis V, already king of the Aquitainians, recognised Hugh as duke of the Franks in a charter of 979. The title fell into abeyance and the Neustrian march ceased to form an administrative unit after Hugh succeeded to the French throne in 987. Nevertheless, the officials and vassals (fideles) of the duchy of Francia became the chief men of the king of France after 987. Although the royal demesne was enlarged by Hugh's accession, royal action became more geographically restricted to Francia.

Modern historians have proffered two interpretations of the 10th-century use of dux Francorum. Jan Dhondt and Walther Kienast argued that the title was a royal concession recognising the actual power acquired by the Robertians over the region known as Francia, that is, old Neustria. Thus the title was territorial in nature, reflective of Hugh's real power and a royal (legal) grant. Ferdinand Lot argued that the title was viceregal and represented authority in theory over the entire realm and in fact power second only to that of the king.

== Dux Francorum orientalium ==
The emergence of the Duchy of Franconia from "a position of leadership amongst the Frankish nation in the eastern kingdom" in the late 9th century is poorly documented. The first clear duke was Conrad the Elder, who was also Duke of Thuringia. In 906 he died and was succeeded as duke by his son, Conrad the Younger, who was elected King of Germany in 911, without relinquishing his ducal office. Although it seems likely that Conrad's brother, Eberhard, held the duchy of Franconia during the reign of Henry I (919–36), the first reference to him with the title dux Francorum comes from early in the reign of Otto I (936–73).

In 956, Otto (II) the Salian inherited Nahegau from his father, Conrad the Red, then added Wormsgau, Speyergau, Niddagau and between the Neckar and the Rhine the counties of Elsenzgau, Kraichgau, Enzgau, Pfinzgau and perhaps Ufgau. Otto was Duke of Carinthia from 978 to 985, and after his retirement from Carinthian office was titled Wormatiensis dux Francorum ("Frankish duke of Worms"), the first titular dukedom in Germany. His son, Conrad, who succeeded him in Carinthia, was also titled "duke of Worms".

Conrad III of Germany, before his election as king, held the title "Duke of the East Franks" (dux Francorum orientalium).

== Sources ==
- Bautier, Robert-Henri (1961). "Le règne d'Eudes (888–898) à la lumière des diplômes expédiés par sa chancellerie". Comptes rendus des séances de l'Académie des Inscriptions et Belles-Lettres. 105 (2): 140–57. doi:10.3406/crai.1961.11298.
- Boniface (1976) [1940]. Ephraim Emerton (ed.). The Letters of Saint Boniface. New York: Norton.
- Boussard, Jacques (1968). "Les destinées de la Neustrie du IX^{e} au XI^{e} siècle". Cahiers de civilisation médiévale. 11 (41): 15–28. doi:10.3406/ccmed.1968.1435.
- Dunbabin, Jean (2000). France in the Making, 843–1180. Oxford University Press.
- Depreux, Philippe (2012). "Le princeps pippinide et l'Occident chrétien". De Mahoma a Carlomagno: Los primeros tiempos (siglos VII–IX) (Acts of the XXXIX Semana de Estudios Medievales de Estella, 17–20 July 2012). Pamplona: Gobierno de Navarra. pp. 61–97. ISBN 9788423533367.
- Jackman, Donald C. (1990). The Konradiner: A Study in Genealogical Methodology. Frankfurt: Vittorio Klostermann.
- Fanning, Steven (1995). "Neustria". In Kibler, William W.; Zinn, Grover A.; Earp, Lawrence (eds.). Medieval France: An Encyclopedia. Routledge. pp. 1249–50.
- Ganshof, François-Louis (1972). "À propos de ducs et de duchés au Haut Moyen Âge". Journal des savants. 1 (1): 13–24.
- Glenn, Jason (2001). "Robertians". In Jeep, John M. (ed.). Medieval Germany: An Encyclopedia. Routledge. pp. 1069–70.
- Higgins, John Seville (1933). "The Ultramontanism of Saint Boniface". Church History. 2 (4): 197–210. doi:10.1017/s0009640700120566.
- Lewis, Archibald R. (1976). "The Dukes in the Regnum Francorum, A.D. 550–751". Speculum. 51 (3): 381–410. doi:10.2307/2851704. JSTOR 2851704. S2CID 162248053.
- Loyn, H. R. (1953). "The Term Ealdorman in the Translations Prepared at the Time of King Alfred". The English Historical Review. 68 (269): 513–25. doi:10.1093/ehr/lxviii.cclxix.513.
- Lyon, Jonathan R. (2012). Princely Brothers and Sisters: The Sibling Bond in German Politics, 1100–1250. Cornell University Press.
- Pixton, Paul B. (2001). "Salians". In Jeep, John M. (ed.). Medieval Germany: An Encyclopedia. Routledge. pp. 1119–22.
- Wolfram, Herwig (1971). "The Shaping of the Early Medieval Principality as a Type of Non-Royal Rulership". Viator. 2: 33–51. doi:10.1484/J.VIATOR.2.301682.
