= Conrad I of Carinthia =

Medieval German nobleman

Conrad I
- Duke of Carinthia
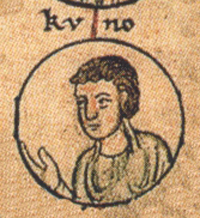
- Conrad I Dux, Chronica sancti Pantaleonis, Cologne, about 1237
- Born: c. 975
- Died: 12 or 15 December 1011
- Buried: St Peter's Dom, Worms
- Noble family: Salian dynasty
- Spouse: Matilda of Swabia
- Issue: Conrad II, Duke of Carinthia; Bruno of Würzburg
- Father: Otto I, Duke of Carinthia
- Mother: Judith

Conrad I (c. 975 – 12 or 15 December 1011), a member of the Salian dynasty, was Duke of Carinthia from 1004 until his death.

== Biography ==
He was the third son of Duke Otto I of Carinthia (d. 1004), who at the time of his birth ruled the Wormsgau in Rhenish Franconia. Conrad thereby was the younger brother of Count Henry of Speyer (d. about 990), the father of the first Salian emperor Conrad II, and brother of Bruno (d. 999), who prepared for an ecclesiastical career and became the first German Pope as Gregory V in 996. His Salian grandfather Conrad the Red had been a loyal supporter of King Otto I of Germany and in turn was enfeoffed with the Duchy of Lotharingia (Lorraine) in 944. He built close relations with the ruling Ottonian dynasty by marrying the king's daughter Liutgarde in 947. However, in 953 he was deposed upon his involvement in an unsuccessful rebellion by Otto's son Duke Liudolf of Swabia against his uncle Duke Henry I of Bavaria.

Conrad's father Otto of Worms ruled over several Frankish Gaue, he was first vested with the Duchy of Carinthia in 978 by Emperor Otto II after the deposition of the Luitpolding duke Henry the Younger in the War of the Three Henries. Otto of Worms remained a supporter of the Ottonian dynasty, even though he had to renounce the duchy, when the emperor's widow Theophanu reconciled with Henry the Younger in 985. Not until the death of the Ottonian duke Henry the Wrangler in 995, he was again vested with Carinthia and also ruled in the March of Verona.

Conrad had already outlived his elder brothers, when upon the sudden death of Emperor Otto III in 1002, his father Otto of Worms was candidate in the royal German election but renounced in favour of the Ottonian duke Henry IV of Bavaria, the son of late Duke Henry the Wrangler. In that year or thereabouts, Conrad married Matilda, daughter of Henry's rival, the Conradine duke Herman II of Swabia. Unlike his father, Conrad supported Herman's bid for the German throne. Finally, Henry was elected and crowned King of the Romans (as Henry II) on 7 June.

Conrad and Matilda had two sons:

- Conrad the Younger, Duke of Carinthia from 1036
- Bruno, Bishop of Würzburg from 1034.

Conrad's marriage with Matilda was consanguineous and was condemned by Henry II (her father's rival) at the synod of Thionville (January 1003). Nevertheless, the couple remained together until Conrad's death in 1011.

When Otto of Worms died in 1004, his only surviving son Conrad could succeed him as Carinthian duke and Margrave of Verona. Upon Conrad's early death, his minor son with Matilda, Conrad the Younger, was passed over in the succession for the Duchy of Carinthia. Instead King Henry II of Germany passed the duchy to Adalbert of Eppenstein, who was married to Matilda's sister, Beatrice. Conrad was buried in Worms Cathedral. His widow Matilda secondly married Duke Frederick II of Lorraine (d. 1026) and thirdly the Ascanian count Esico of Ballenstedt.

Conrad I of Carinthia Salian dynasty Born: c. 975 Died: 12 or 15 December 1011
Preceded by Otto I	Duke of Carinthia; 1004–1011	Succeeded by Adalbero
