= Wormsgau =

Coordinates: 49.6319°N 8.3652°E

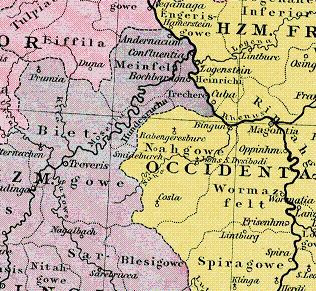
Wormsgau (Wormazfelt) in Rhenish Franconia, about 1000

The Wormsgau (Latin: pagus wormatiensis) was a medieval county in the East Frankish (German) stem duchy of Franconia, comprising the surroundings of the city of Worms and further territories on the left bank of the Upper Rhine river. Together with the neighbouring Nahegau and Speyergau, it belonged to the central Rhenish Franconian possessions of the Imperial Salian dynasty.

== Overview ==
The Wormsgau covered large parts of the present-day Rhenish Hesse and Palatinate regions, originally stretching northwards just before Coblenz in Lotharingia. The city of Mainz belonged likewise to it as, to the start of the 9th century, also Boppard, which in reality c. 825 was already lost again. In the 10th century, the Wormsgau lost extended lands in the North, mostly to the benefit of the Nahegau, like Ingelheim in 937, Spiesheim in 960, Saulheim in 973 and Flonheim in 996, until the Selz river defined the northern border. The losses could be partially compensated through expansion up the Rhine and to the West, especially in the Palatinate Forest range.

== Counts in Wormsgau ==
=== Robertians ===
1. Rupert I (Robert I) (722/757 attested, † before 764) 732 dux in Haspengau, 741/742 comes palatinus (Count Palatine), ca. 750 Count in Oberrhein- and Wormsgau, 757 royal missus in Italy, ∞ ca. 730 Williswint († after 768) founded in the 12 July 764 Abbey of Lorsch, heiress in the Upper Rhine and of Hahnheim in Rheinhessen, heiress of Count Adalhelm
2. Robert II (Rutbert II o. Hruodbertus) (770 attested, † 12 July 807), his grandson, 795/807 Count in Worms- and Oberrheingau, 795 Lord to Dienheim, ∞ I Theoderata (Tiedrada) (766/777 attested, † before 789), ∞ II Isengarde, 789
3. Robert III (Rutpert III) († before 834) his son, 812/830 Count in Wormsgau, Count in Oberrheingau, 825 imperial missus in Bishopric of Mainz, ∞ ca. 808 Wiltrud (Waldrada) of Orléans, 829/834 heiress of possessions in Orléans, daughter of Count Hadrian and of Waldrat from the House of the Widonen
4. Guntram, his son, Count in Wormsgau 815/837
5. Ruadbert (Robert), 817 Count in Saalgau, Oberrheingau and Wormsgau (frankish Babenberger)
6. Rutpert IV (Robert I der Starke) (X 15 September or 25 July 866 in the Battle of Brissarthe) brother of Guntram, 836-after 840 Count in Wormsgau, 852 Abbot of Saint-Martin-de-Marmoutier by Tours, 853 Count of Tours, 861/866 nobilis Franciae (Franzien, Île-de-France) and Count of Paris, ∞ I NN, probably Agane, ∞ II start of 864 Adelaide (Aelis) of Tours († after 866) daughter of Count Hugo of Tours (Etichonen) and of Bava, widow of Conrad I, Count of Aargau and Auxerre, Count of Linzgau (Welfen)
7. Walaho IV (Werner IV) († probably before 890), Salian dynasty (?), Count in Wormsgau after 840 ∞ Oda, daughter of Rutbert III
8. Megingoz I, 876, probably Count in Wormsgau (Wilhelminer), ∞ NN, probably a sister of Roberts des Starken

=== Salian dynasty ===
1. Werner V(† probably 920), Salier, Count in Nahegau, Speyergau and Wormsgau ca. 890/910, ∞ NN from the House of the Konradiner

=== Konradiner ===
1. Konrad Kurzbold († 30 June 948), 906/907 and 932 Count in Wormsgau, 910 Count in Niederlahngau, 927 Count in Ahrgau, Count in Lobdengau, founded 910 the Abbey St. Georg in Limburg an der Lahn, where he was also buried

=== Salian dynasty ===
1. Konrad der Rote († 955), son of Werner V, Count in Nahegau, Speyergau, Wormsgau and Niddagau, Count in Franconia, Duke of Lorraine, ∞ ca. 947 Liutgard of Saxony (* 931, † 953) daughter of King Otto I (Liudolfinger)
2. Otto „of Worms“ († 1004), his son, Count in Nahegau, Speyergau, Wormsgau, Elsenzgau, Kraichgau, Enzgau, Pfinzgau and Ufgau, Duke of Carinthia
1. Heinrich „von Worms“ († 989/1000) his son, Count in Wormsgau, ∞ Adelheid († probably 1039/1046), sister of the Counts Adalbert and Gerhard (Matfriede)
2. Conrad II der Jüngere (* probably 1003, † 1039) his nephew, Count in Nahegau, Speyergau and Wormsgau, Duke of Carinthia (1036-1039)

== Literature ==
- (in German) Geschichtlicher Atlas der Rheinlande, 7. Lieferung, IV9: Die mittelalterlichen Gaue, 2000, 1 Kartenblatt, 1 Beiheft, bearbeitet von Thomas Bauer, ISBN 3-7927-1818-9
