= Conrad II of Carinthia =

German duke (c. 1003–1039)

Conrad the Younger
- Duke of Carinthia
- Reign: 1035–1039
- Predecessor: Adalbero, Duke of Carinthia
- Successor: Henry III, Holy Roman Emperor
- Born: c. 1003
- Died: 20 July 1039
- Buried: Worms Cathedral
- Noble family: Salian dynasty
- Father: Conrad I, Duke of Carinthia
- Mother: Matilda of Swabia

Conrad II (c. 1003 – 20 July 1039), called the Younger (German: Konrad der Jüngere), a member of the Salian dynasty, was the duke of Carinthia and margrave of Verona from 1035 until his death.

== Biography ==
Conrad's parents were Duke Conrad I of Carinthia and his wife Matilda, a daughter of the Conradine duke Herman II of Swabia. His father died in 1011, when Conrad the Younger was still a minor, and King Henry II vested Adalbero of Eppenstein with the Carinthian duchy. Instead Conrad succeeded his father as count in the Salian home territories of Nahegau, Speyergau, and Wormsgau. In the conflict over the heritage of Duke Herman II of Swabia he allied with his Salian cousin Conrad the Elder (the son of his paternal uncle Henry of Speyer) against Duke Adalbero of Carinthia, whom they defeated in a 1019 battle near Ulm.

When Emperor Henry II died in 1024, Conrad the Younger, like his father Conrad I and his grandfather Otto I in 1002, was a candidate for the German kingship. Nevertheless, through the agency of Court Chaplain Wipo of Burgundy, he renounced in favour of his cousin Conrad the Elder, who was elected king. In compensation, Conrad the Younger may have been promised the succession in the Carinthian duchy. Nevertheless, while Conrad the Elder proceeded to his coronation in Rome in 1027, an open conflict arose between the cousins until Conrad the Younger finally submitted in September.

In May 1035, Duke Adalbero of Carinthia rebelled against Salian rule and was deprived of his duchy. Conrad the Younger was chosen to replace him and finally received Carinthia, though without the Carantanian march. In 1036-37 he accompanied the emperor on his expedition to Italy and acceded the custody of the arrested Archbishop Aribert of Milan, who however soon escaped. Conrad did not live long thereafter, dying in 1039. He was buried alongside his father and mother Matilda in Worms Cathedral. On his death, his natural heir was the Salian king Henry III, son and successor of Conrad the Elder.

No marriage is recorded of Conrad, though a son, named Cuno, appears in 1056, selling Bruchsal to King Henry IV. However, it is more likely that Cuno was the 'son of' Bishop Conrad of Speyer since Bruchsal was in the church's hands by this time.

== Sources ==
- Wolfram, Herwig (2015). "Conrad II (990-1039), the First Medieval Emperor of Three Kingdoms". In Halfond, Gregory I. (ed.). The Medieval Way of War: Studies in Medieval Military History in Honor of Bernard S. Bachrach. Ashgate Publishing, Ltd. ISBN 978-1472419606.

Conrad II of Carinthia Salian dynasty Born: c. 1003 Died: 20 July 1039
Preceded by Adalbero	Duke of Carinthia; 1035–1039	Succeeded by Henry IV
