= Speyergau =

Historical county in East Francia

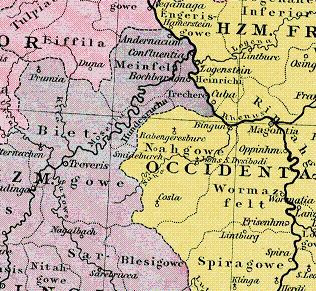
Speyergau (Spiragowe) in Rhenish Franconia, c. 1000

Speyergau was a medieval county in the East Frankish (German) stem duchy of Franconia. It was centred around the administrative centre of Speyer and roughly covered the former Roman administrative area of Civitas Nemetum, which is today the south-eastern portion of the Palatinate region between the Rhine river, the Palatinate Forest range, and some smaller parts of northern Alsace. The Speyergau, together with the neighbouring Wormsgau and Nahegau, was part of the major possessions held by the Salian dynasty of German kings and Holy Roman Emperors.

== Counts of Speyergau ==
Some renowned counts of Speyergau were:

1. Werner V (c. 899 - c. 935), the first definite progenitor of the Salian Dynasty, also count of Nahegau and Wormsgau, member of the house of Conradines.
2. Conrad the Red (X 955), son of Werner V, also count of Nahegau, Wormsgau and Niddagau, count in Franconia, duke of Lorraine, ∞ around 947 Liutgard of Saxony (born 931, died 953), daughter of Otto I, Holy Roman Emperor
3. Otto of Worms (died 1004), only son of Conrad the Red, also count of Nahegau, Wormsgau, Elsenzgau, Kraichgau, Enggau, Pfinzgau and Ufgau, duke of Carinthia
4. Conrad II the younger, (born probably 1003, died 1039), grandson of Otto I, also count of Nahegau, Wormsgau, duke of Carinthia (1036-1039)

== Rural reeves (Landvogt) of Speyergau ==
- Georg I. von Geroldseck, count of Veldenz, 1310/15
- Otto V. von Ochsenstein, died 1327, 1291/1302 Landvogt of Ortenau, 1315/27 Landvogt of Alsace, 1318 Landvogt of Speyergau
- Otto VI. von Ochsenstein, Landvogt of Alsace and Speyergau, died before 1377
