= Henry of Speyer =

Member of the Salian dynasty

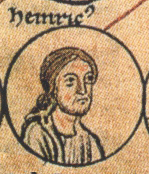
- Depiction in the Chronica sancti Pantaleonis, about 1237
- Born: c. 970
- Died: between 989 and 992
- Buried: Worms Cathedral
- Noble family: Salian dynasty
- Spouse: Adelaide of Metz
- Issue: Conrad II, Holy Roman Emperor; Judith of Speyer
- Father: Otto von Worms
- Mother: Judith (of Bavaria?)

Henry of Speyer (German: Heinrich von Speyer, also Heinrich von Worms; c. 970 – 989/992 or 28 March 997), a member of the Salian dynasty, was count in the Rhenish Franconian Wormsgau. He was the father of Emperor Conrad II.

== Life ==
According to the 977 donation deed of Lambrecht Abbey, Henry was the eldest son of Count Otto von Worms (d. 1004), Duke of Carinthia from 978 to 983 and again from 995, and his wife Judith. He married Adelaide of Metz (d. 1039/46), a sister of the Lotharingian counts Gerhard of the Mosel, Count of Metz and Adalbert, Count of the Saargau. The marriage produced a son, Conrad (c. 990 – 1039), who was elected King of the Romans in 1024 and crowned Holy Roman Emperor three years later, and a daughter, Judith. Henry's younger brother Bruno was elected Pope Gregory V in 996, his brother Conrad I succeeded their father as Duke of Carinthia in 1004.

Little is known of Henry's life, since he died at around the age of 20, even predeceasing his father Otto. He is buried in Worms Cathedral along with his daughter Judith. Adelaide outlived her husband by many years; she secondly married another Franconian count, possibly from the Elder House of Babenberg (Popponids), and died in 1046.

== Sources ==
- Wilson, Peter H. (2016). Heart of Europe: A History of the Holy Roman Empire. Harvard University Press.
- Wolfram, Herwig (2006). Conrad II, 990-1039: Emperor of Three Kingdoms. Translated by Kaiser, Denise A. The Pennsylvania State University Press.
