= Judith of Carinthia =

10th-century Carinthian noble woman

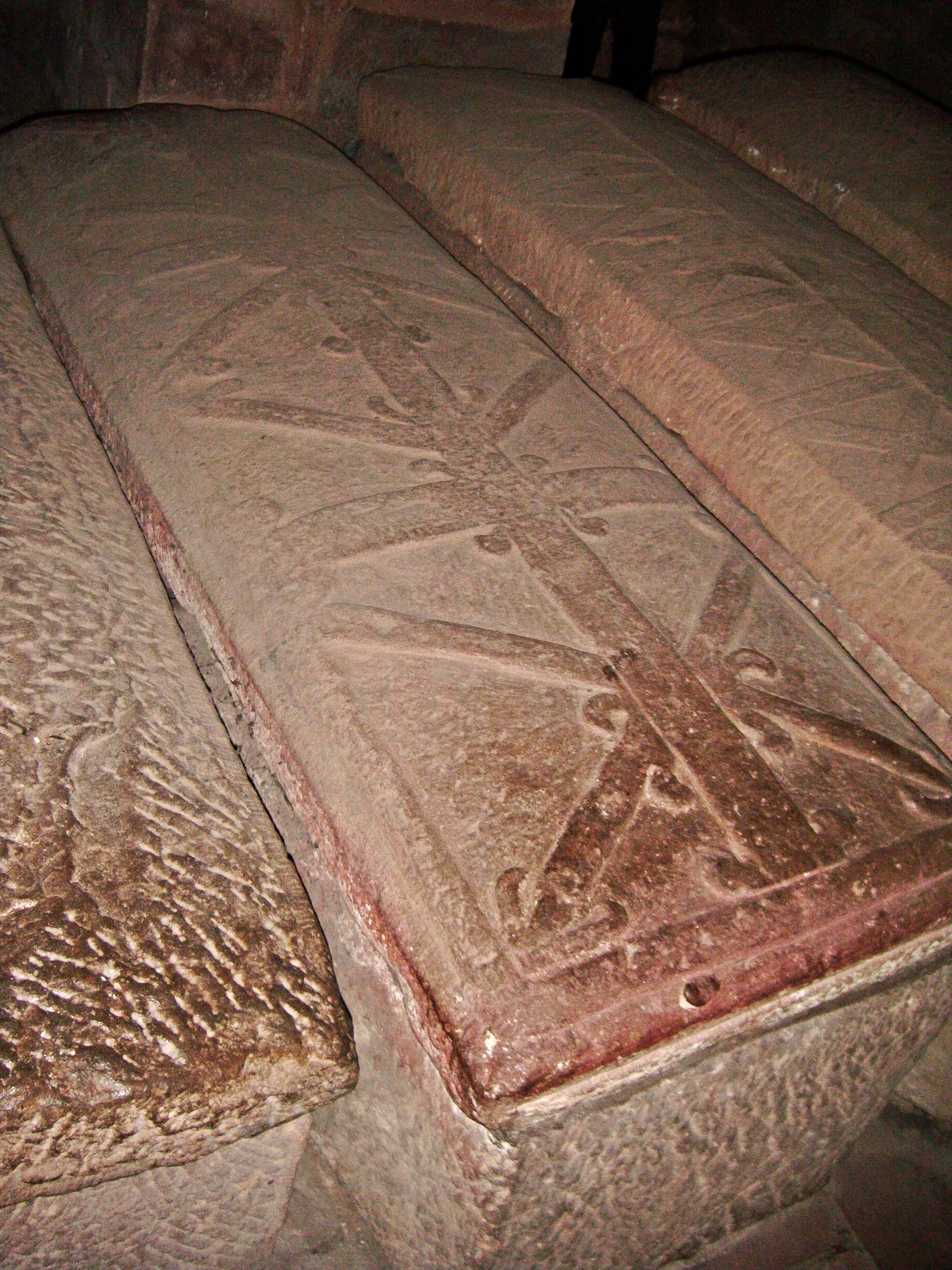
Judit's tomb in the cathedral of Worms

Judith von Kärnten (died 991), also Judith of Bavaria, was a Carinthian noble woman, likely from the Luitpolding dynasty, and Duchess of Carinthia.

== Life ==
Little definite information is known about her life. Scholars typically connect her to the Luitpolding dynasty due to her name which was common in this family and also due to the fact that her husband Otto was given the duchy of Carinthia, which would have been likely if she was from there. It is typically assumed that her grandfather was Arnulf, Duke of Bavaria and her father Arnulf's son Henry.

She married Count Otto of Wormsgau who was made duke of Carinthia in 978. It is possible that Judith and Otto lived in Carinthia already before that year, and the village Stainbach claims to be the birthplace of her son Bruno (born ca. 972) who would later become Pope Gregory V. Through her son Henry of Speyer she became the grandmother of the Holy Roman emperor Conrad II of the Salian dynasty. She died in 991.

According to a charter of Conrad II from 1034, she was buried in one of the six tombs in front of the altar in Worms Cathedral. When during construction in 1906 works several tombs were discovered, the project manager Philipp Brand matched these to those members of the Salian dynasty, among them Judith and her two sons Henry and Conrad.

== Issue ==
Together with her husband Otto she had the following known four children:

- Henry of Speyer (died before 1000), Count in the Wormsgau
- Pope Gregory V (died 999)
- Conrad I, Duke of Carinthia (died 1011)
- William I, Bishop of Strasbourg (died 1047)

== Sources ==
- König, Alexandra (2008). "Die textilen Grabfunden aus dem Dom zu Worms". Der Wormsgau (PDF).
- Moehs, Teta E. (1972). Gregorius V, 996-999: A Biographical Study. A. Hiersemann. ISBN 978-3-7772-7214-6.
- Wolfram, Herwig (1 November 2010). Conrad II, 990-1039: Emperor of Three Kingdoms. Penn State Press. ISBN 978-0-271-04818-5.
