= Werner V (Salian) =

German count

- Count
- Born: c. 899
- Died: c. 935
- Noble family: Salian dynasty
- Spouse: Hicha of Swabia
- Issue: Conrad the Red
- Father: presumably Werner IV
- Mother: presumably Oda

Werner V (c. 899 – c. 935) was a Rhenish Franconian count in Nahegau, Speyergau and Wormsgau. He is one of the earliest-documented ancestors of the Salian dynasty that provided German kings and emperors of the Holy Roman Empire from 1024 to 1125.

Werner's origins have not been conclusively established: his ancestor presumably was Werner IV (also called Walaho), who appeared as a count in the Wormsgau about 840 and was married to Oda, a daughter of the Robertian count Robert III of Worms. He inherited the Worms estates, after Oda's brother, Robert the Strong, left his home and rose to power in West Francia. His daughter Wiltrud married the Conradine noble Eberhard (d. 902/03), a count in the Niederlahngau and brother of Conrad the Elder; she thereby became the aunt of future king Conrad I of Germany.

Werner V first appeared as a count in 906; as he was related to the most powerful Franconian dynasties, he quickly assumed a leading position in the stem duchy, particularly after Conrad I had become duke and was elected king in 911. According to the contemporary chronicles by Flodoard, he had the Reims ecclesiastical lands in the Palatinate confiscated and the Bishop of Speyer blinded.

Werner married Hicha (c. 905 – 950), a daughter of Duke Burchard II of Swabia and his wife Regilinde of Zurich. Their only son was Conrad the Red, who was appointed Duke of Lotharingia in 944.
