= Nahegau =

German county

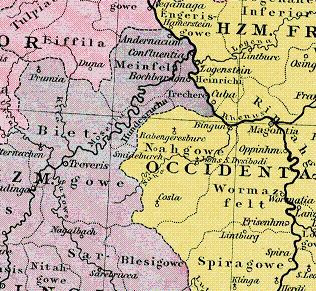
The Nahegau ("Nahgowe") next to the Hundesrucha c. 1000

The Nahegau was a county in the Middle Ages, which covered the environs of the Nahe and large parts of present-day Rhenish Hesse, after a successful expansion of the narrow territory, which did not reach the Rhine, to the disadvantage of the Wormsgau. Among other expansions were Ingelheim in 937, Spiesheim in 960, Saulheim in 973 and Flonheim in 996, until after the end of the expansion the Selz set the southern limit and the limit to the Wormsgau.

The Nahegau was among the central possessions of the Salian dynasty, to which from the mid-11th century the Emichones succeeded. The family of the Emichones divided itself later into the Counts of Veldenz, the Wildgraves and the Raugraves. Perhaps the Leiningen family descended from the Emichones as well.

Counts in Nahegau were:

1. Werner (died probably 920) Count in Nahegau, Speyergau and Wormsgau c. 890/910, married NN from the House of the Konradiner
2. Conrad der Rote (died 955), his son, Count in Nahegau, Speyergau, Wormsgau and Niddagau, Count in Franconia, Duke of Lorraine, married c. 947 Liutgard of Saxony (born 931, died 953) daughter of King Otto I (Liudolfinger)
3. Otto "of Worms" (died 1004), his son, Count in Nahegau, Speyergau, Wormsgau, Elsenzgau, Kraichgau, Enzgau, Pfinzgau and Ufgau, Duke of Carinthia
4. Conrad II. der Jüngere (born probably 1003, died 1039) his grandson, Count in Nahegau, Speyergau and Wormsgau, Duke of Carinthia 1036–1039

== Literature ==
- Bauer, Thomas: Geschichtlicher Atlas der Rheinlande, 7. Lieferung, IV.9: Die mittelalterlichen Gaue; 2000; ISBN 3-7927-1818-9
