= Judith of Bavaria =

Judith of Bavaria may refer to:

- Judith of Bavaria (died 843), wife of Louis the Pious
- Judith, Duchess of Bavaria (born 925), wife of Henry I of Bavaria
- Judith of Carinthia (died 991), probably of the Bavarian Luitpoldings, wife of Otto I, Duke of Carinthia
- Judith of Bavaria, Duchess of Swabia (1103–1131), wife of Frederick II, Duke of Swabia
