= War of the Three Henries (976–978) =

Rebellion of three German princes, all called Henry, against Emperor Otto II in 976–977

Holy Roman Empire 972–1032

The War of the Three Henries was a brief rebellion of three German princes, all called Henry, against Emperor Otto II in 976–977, with a final peace imposed in 978. The three Henries were: Henry I, Bishop of Augsburg, Henry II, Duke of Bavaria, and Henry I, Duke of Carinthia.

== Restlessness of the nobility ==
In 973 Otto II had succeeded his father Emperor Otto I without disturbance. However, like his father he had to cope with a restless Saxon nobility, hostile towards his "foreign" consort, Theophanu, and the unstable conditions in Italy culminating in the murder of Pope Benedict VI in 974.

== Hostility between Otto II and Henry II ==
He attempted a conciliation with his Ottonian cousin Henry II, Duke of Bavaria, but Henry—not for nothing called "the Wrangler"—challenged the Emperor by enthroning his Luitpolding relative Henry I as Bishop of Augsburg in 973 with the aid of Burchard III, Duke of Swabia. Otto had to approve the installation; when Duke Burchard III died in the same year, he denied the Burcharding heritage claims, by vesting his nephew Otto I with the Duchy of Swabia. This enfeoffment in turn was considered as an affront by Henry the Wrangler. He forged an alliance with Boleslaus II, Duke of Bohemia, and Mieszko I of Poland, but chose to submit before armed conflicts broke out.

== Armed conflict ==
Temporarily imprisoned in Ingelheim, Duke Henry returned to Bavaria in 976 and continued to plot against Otto, even scheming with Saxon nobles like Gunther, Margrave of Merseburg, Egbert the One-Eyed or Dedo I of Wettin. Otto marched against Bavaria and occupied Henry's residence in Regensburg; the duke had to flee to the court of his ally Boleslaus II of Bohemia. In Regenburg, Otto declared Henry deposed and decreed the separation of the Carinthian lands from Bavaria, about a third of the duchy's territory. He enfeoffed his nephew Otto I, Duke of Swabia since 973, with remaining Bavaria and vested the Luitpolding scion Henry the Younger with the newly established Duchy of Carinthia.

In 977, the conflict escalated. While the emperor's troops invaded the Duchy of Bohemia and enforced the submission of Duke Boleslaus II, a new conspiracy arose in Bavaria. The conspirators — Bishop Henry I of Augsburg, the recently deposed Henry the Wrangler, and the Carinthian Duke Henry I the Younger — even had the support of the Church. Emperor Otto could rely on the support of his nephew Otto I, then Duke of Swabia and Bavaria, and attacked Passau, where the rebels had assembled. Finally in September 977, the town surrendered due to his siege tactics, which included a bridge of boats. At the Easter court of 978, at Magdeburg, the three insurrectionists were punished. Both dukes were banished: Henry the Wrangeler was imprisoned in the custody of Bishop Folcmar of Utrecht; Henry of Carinthia lost his duchy to the Salian Count Otto of Worms, son of Conrad the Red, the former Duke of Lotharingia. Bishop Henry was arrested in Werden Abbey, but released in July.

== Legacy ==
The War of the Three Henries was quickly followed by a war with France. In August 978, King Lothair of France surprised Otto by taking his army of nearly 20,000 against Aachen. Otto fled to Dortmund to prepare a response. In September Otto counter-invaded the West Frankish kingdom, capturing Reims, Soissons, Laon and laying siege to Paris. But plague and the onset of winter forced Otto to lift the siege and withdraw back to Germany. Lothair gave chase and destroyed the German rearguard.

The chief result of the conflict was the complete subjection of Bavaria: henceforth it was no longer the indisputably greatest of the stem duchies. Unlike his father, Otto II made no attempt to reconcile with the Bavarian branch of his dynasty: Duke Henry's minor son and heir Henry II was sent to the Bishop of Hildesheim in order to prepare for an ecclesiastical career. His father Henry the Wrangler was not released until the emperor's death in 983.

== Sources ==
- Gwatkin, H. M., Whitney, J. P. (ed) et al. The Cambridge Medieval History: Volume III. Cambridge University Press, 1926.
- Reuter, Timothy (1993). Germany in the Early Middle Ages, 800–1056. London: Longman.
