= Liutgard of Saxony (died 953) =

Duchess consort of Lotharingia

Liutgarde
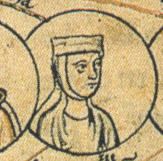
- Luitgarda of Saxony, Chronica sancti Pantaleonis, Cologne, c. 1237

Duchess consort of Lorraine
- Tenure: 947 – 18 November 953
- Born: 932; Magdeburg, Saxony
- Died: 18 November 953; Mainz, Franconia
- Burial: St. Alban's Abbey, Mainz
- Spouse: Conrad, Duke of Lorraine (m. 947)
- Issue: Otto I, Duke of Carinthia
- Dynasty: Ottonian
- Father: Otto the Great
- Mother: Eadgyth

Liutgarde of Saxony (Liudgard, 932 – 18 November 953), a member of the Ottonian dynasty, was Duchess of Lorraine from 947 until her death by her marriage with Duke Conrad the Red. She and Conrad became progenitors of the Salian dynasty.

== Life ==
Liutgarde was the only daughter of King Otto I of Germany from his first marriage with Edith of England, half-sister of King Æthelstan. To build closer ties to the Salian dynasty, King Otto in 947 married her off to Conrad the Red, whom he had installed as Duke of Lorraine three years before. The marriage was not particularly happy. Around 950 Liutgarde gave birth to a son, Otto of Worms. Her husband accompanied the king on his Italian campaign in 951; however, he fell out with Otto over the agreements made with King Berengar II.

Liutgarde died at Mainz in 953, where Conrad the Red had joined the rebellion of her elder brother Duke Liudolf of Swabia and Archbishop Frederick. She was buried in St. Alban's Abbey, Mainz Next year, Duke Conrad finally submitted himself to the authority of King Otto and remained a loyal supporter; he died at the 955 Battle of Lechfeld. Liutgarde's brother Liudolf died two years later, while on campaign in Italy.

Upon the death of Emperor Otto in 973, the Empire passed through his second wife Adelaide of Italy to their son Otto II. In turn, Liudolf's son Otto I was vested with the Duchy of Swabia, while Liutgarde's son Otto of Worms succeeded as Duke of Carinthia in 978. Upon the death of Emperor Otto III in 1002, Otto of Worms also appeared as a candidate in the royal election but renounced in favour of the Ottonian duke Henry IV of Bavaria, a grandson of Emperor Otto I's brother Duke Henry I. After Henry's death, Liutgarde's great-grandson Conrad II was elected King of the Romans, the first of the Salian dynasty.

== Sources ==
- Reuter, Timothy (1991). Germany in the Early Middle Ages, 800-1056. Longman Group UK Unlimited.
- Schutz, Herbert (2010). The Medieval Empire in Central Europe: Dynastic Continuity in the Post-Carolingian Frankish Realm, 900–1300. Cambridge Scholars Publishing. pp. 41–70. ISBN 978-1-4438-1966-4.

Liutgard of Saxony (died 953) Ottonian dynasty Born: 932 Died: 18 November 953
German royalty
Preceded by ?	Duchess of Lorraine; 947–953	Succeeded by Beatrice of Paris (from 959)
