= Adelaide of Metz =

Medieval French noblewoman

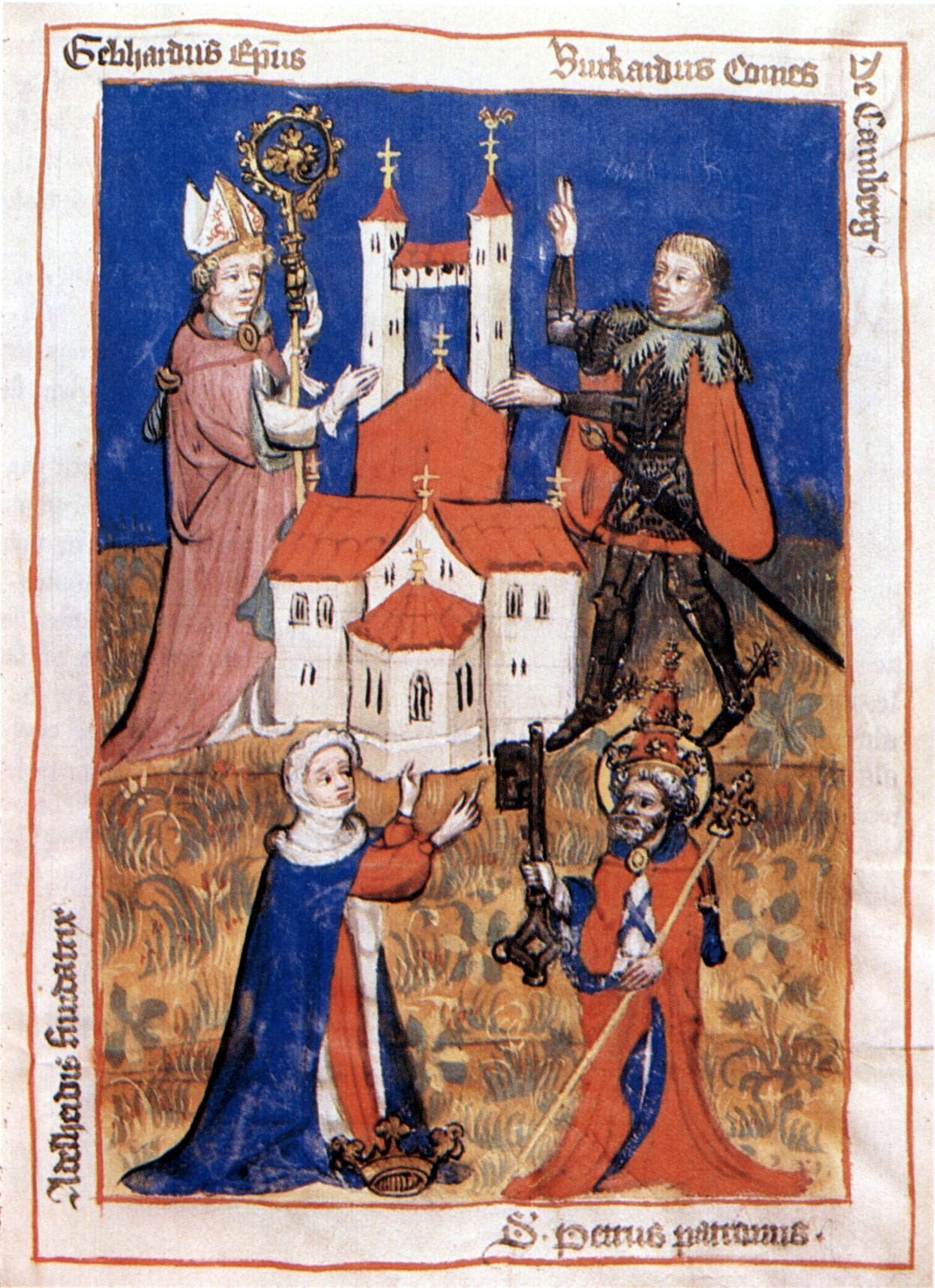
- Adelheid (bottom left) at the founding of the Öhringer Canon in 1037 (representation from circa 1420)
- Born: 970; Egisheim
- Died: 19 May 1046; Öhringen
- Buried: Öhringen
- Noble family: Matfriding
- Spouse: Henry of Speyer
- Issue: Conrad II, Holy Roman Emperor; Judith of Speyer; Gebhard III, Bishop of Regensburg

Adelaide of Metz (970 – 19 May 1046) was a French noblewoman.

Adelaide was born in 970 in Eguisheim. She was a member of the Matfriding dynasty, descending from Matfrid. Her parents are unknown but she was a sister of Adalbert and Gerhard. She married Henry of Speyer, a German count and member of the Salian dynasty. They had two children, Judith of Speyer and Conrad II, Holy Roman Emperor. After her husband's death, she married a Frankish count from the Babenberg dynasty and had another son, Gebhard III, Bishop of Regensburg. In 1037 she founded the Collegiate Church in Öhringen.

== Sources ==
- Bogdan, Henry (2007). La Lorraine des ducs (in French). Perrin. ISBN 978-2-262-04275-2.
