= Bruno (bishop of Würzburg) =

Roman Catholic saint

Saint Bruno of Würzburg
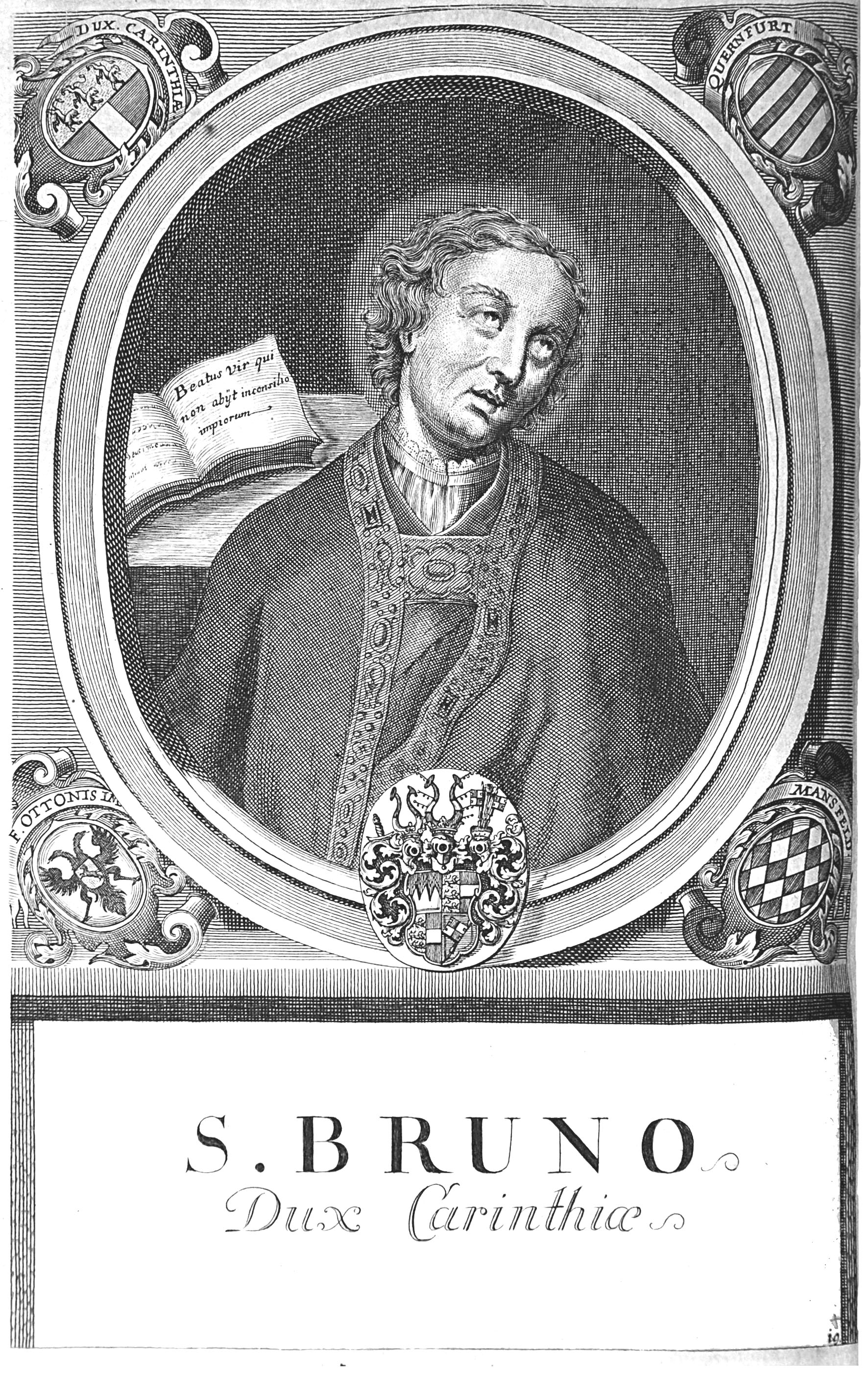
- Engraving by Würzburg court and university engraver Johann Salver (1670–1738) from the series of Würzburg prince-bishops
- Born: c. 1005
- Died: 27 May 1045
- Venerated in: Catholic Church
- Feast: 27 May

Bruno of Würzburg (c. 1005 – 27 May 1045), also known as Bruno of Carinthia, was imperial chancellor of Italy from 1027 to 1034 for Conrad II, Holy Roman Emperor, to whom he was related, and from 1034 until his death prince-bishop of Würzburg.

== Origin and Imperial politics ==
Bruno was the son of Conrad I, Duke of Carinthia, and Matilda of Swabia, and thus a cousin of the Salian Emperor Conrad II. He courted Agnes of Poitou on behalf of Conrad's son and successor Emperor Henry III. Bruno laid the cornerstone of Würzburg Cathedral, and in 1042 dedicated the Abbey of St. Burchard, rebuilt by Abbot Willemund.

He also accompanied Henry on his second Hungarian Campaign, during which Bruno died in an accident at Persenbeug on the Danube in the present Lower Austria.

== Death ==
The retinue of Henry III had stopped at the residence of Countess Richlinde of Ebersberg, who was faced with the task of distributing the estate of her recently deceased husband, Count Adalbero II of Ebersberg. During a great banquet given by the countess, a load-bearing pillar supporting the banqueting hall broke, causing the entire floor to collapse. The king was only slightly hurt, but the countess, Bishop Bruno and Abbot Altmann of Ebersberg Abbey were so badly injured that they did not survive more than a few days. The Annals of Niederaltaich add a legend to the story: before the feast, at the Strudengau on the Danube near Grein, the devil was supposed to have appeared to the bishop and threatened him already, but the bishop was able to repel him. Bruno's body was returned to his residence in Würzburg.

He was succeeded by his nephew, Adalbero of Würzburg.

== Burial and cultus ==
Many cathedrals were built in that period, and from 1040, Bruno began the construction of Würzburg Cathedral. The consecration of the crypt on 16 June 1045 was combined with his burial. Bruno was not formally canonised by the Roman Catholic Church, but is nevertheless revered as a saint. His feast day is 17 May (not the 27th, see Roman Martyrology).

== Works ==
Manuscript fragment of Bruno of Wurzburg's commentary on Psalms

Popularly attributed to Bruno (Note: Some scholars dispute his authorship.) is a well-known glossed commentary on Psalms, sometimes called Expositio Psalmorum. It consists largely of extracts from the writings of the Church Fathers. The work was unusually popular for a glossed psalter, being copied numerous times in manuscripts and early printed books.

== Sources ==
- Peter Kolb and Ernst-Günther Krenig (eds.), 1989: Unterfränkische Geschichte, pp. 229–232. Würzburg

Preceded by Meginhard I	Bishop of Würzburg; 1034–1045	Succeeded by Adalbero
