= William I (bishop of Strasbourg) =

Bishop of Strasbourg (died c.1046)

William I (died on 7 November 1046 or 1047) was bishop of Strasbourg from 1028 or 1029. Being a son of Otto of Worms, the first Salian duke of Carinthia, William was the uncle of Conrad II, Holy Roman Emperor who appointed him to the bishopric. His tenure was uneventful.

== Early life ==
William was the fourth son of Otto of Worms by his wife, Judith (whose parentage is uncertain). Otto of Worms was a maternal grandson of Otto I, Holy Roman Emperor. He held more than five counties in Franconia before he received Carinthia from his cousin, the future Emperor Otto III in 978. William and one of his elder brother, Bruno, were destined to Church career from their birth. Bruno, who was born in 972, became the first German pope and assumed the name Pope Gregory V in 996, but he died in 999. William started his Church career in the royal court. He became the archchaplain to Queen Gisella—the wife of his nephew, King Conrad II.

== Bishop ==
Werner I, Bishop of Strasbourg, died on a diplomatic mission in Constantinople on 28 October 1028. Strasbourg was one of the wealthiest German episcopal sees, owing the service of 100 armored knights to the royal army. King Conrad II offered the bishopric to Abbot Poppo of Stavelot, but Poppo informed the King that he was a priest's son, thus disqualifying himself from the office. William was the King's next candidate and he was ordained bishop in 1028 or 1029.

== Sources ==
- Weinfurter, Stefan (1999) [1992]. The Salian Century: Main Currents in an Age of Transition. Translated by Kaiser, Denise A. University of Pennsylvania Press. ISBN 0-8122-3508-8.
- Wolfram, Herwig (2006) [2000]. Conrad II, 990–1039: Emperor of Three Kingdoms. Translated by Bowlus, Barbara M. The Pennsylvania State University Press. ISBN 0-271-02738-X.

Catholic Church titles
Preceded by Werner I	Bishop of Strasbourg; 1028/29–1046/47	Succeeded by unknown
