= Salian dynasty =

German dynasty in the High Middle Ages

Salians Salier Reges salici
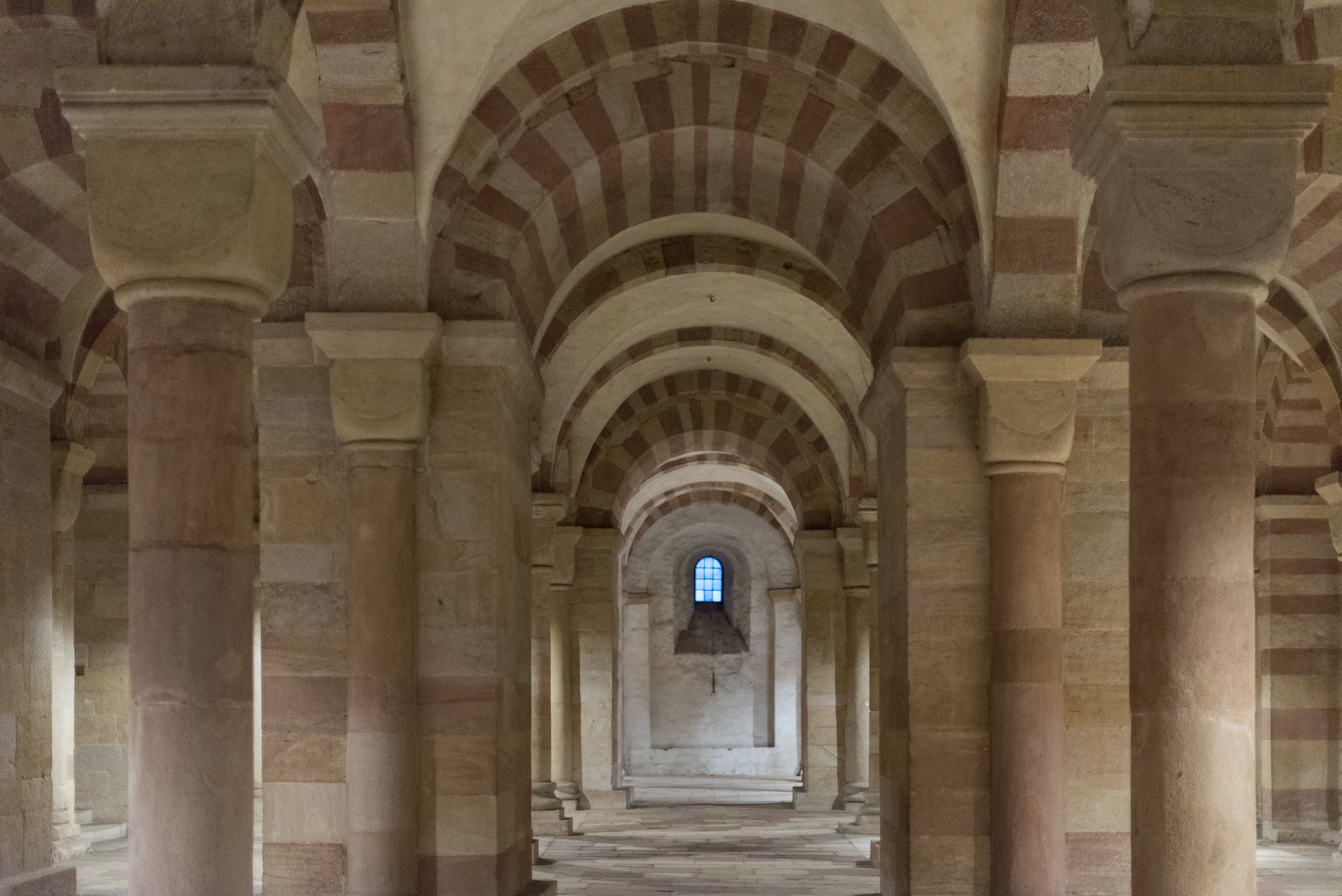
- The crypt of Speyer Cathedral, the Salian emperors' burial place
- Parent family: Widonids (?)
- Country: Holy Roman Empire; Germany; Italy; Burgundy; Carinthia; Bavaria; Swabia
- Origin: Franconia
- Founded: Early 10th century
- Founder: Count Werner
- Final ruler: Emperor Henry V
- Members: Pope Gregory V Emperor Conrad II; Emperor Henry III; Emperor Henry IV
- Connected families: Ottonian; Hohenstaufen; Babenberg
- Distinctions: Investiture Controversy
- Traditions: Roman Catholicism
- Dissolution: 1125; 901 years ago

The Salian dynasty or Salic dynasty (German: Salier) was a European royal dynasty in the High Middle Ages. The dynasty provided four kings of Germany (1024–1125), all of whom went on to be crowned Holy Roman emperors (1027–1125).

After the death of the last Ottonian emperor in 1024, the Kingdom of Germany and later the entire Holy Roman Empire passed to Conrad II, a Salian. He was followed by three more Salian rulers: Henry III, Henry IV, and Henry V. They established their monarchy as a major European power.

The Salian dynasty developed a permanent administrative system based on a class of public officials answerable to the crown. As well, traditional rules of succession, according to strict male primogeniture, initially found in a Frankish (and Carolingian) legal code named Salic law, were both used by the dynasty and helped give it its name.

== Origins and name ==
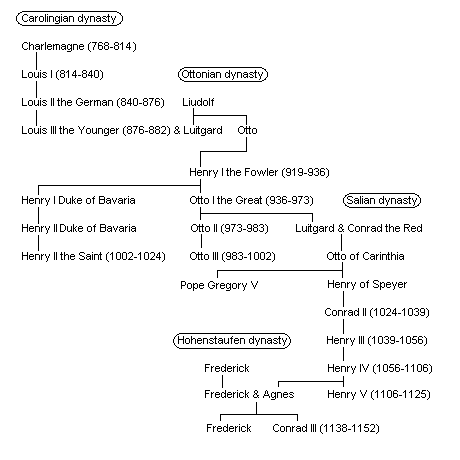
The family tree of the early imperial dynasties of the Holy Roman Empire: Carolingians, Ottonians, Salians and Hohenstaufen

Modern historians suppose that the Salians descended from the Widonids, a prominent noble kindred emerging in the 7th century. Their estates were located at the confluence of rivers Moselle and Saar and they supported the Carolingians. The Widonids' eastward expansion towards the river Rhine started after they founded Hornbach Abbey in the Bliesgau around 750. Hornbach remained their proprietary monastery and royal grants to the abbey established their presence in the Wormsgau. As time passed, several branches split off the Widonids. The late 9th-century Holy Roman Emperor Guy (or Wido) of Spoleto descended from one of these branches, the Lambertines. The Salians' forefathers remained in Rhenish Franconia.

Wipo of Burgundy, the biographer of the first Salian monarch, Emperor Conrad II, described Conrad's father and uncle as "distinguished noble lords from Rhenish Franconia" around 1044, but without calling them Salians. Wipo added that Conrad's mother, Adelaide of Metz, was "supposedly descended from the ancient royal house of Troy". The statement made a connection between Conrad and the royal Merovingians who had claimed a Trojan ancestry for themselves.

Historian Stefan Weinfurter proposes that the putative relationship between the Salians and the Merovingians gave rise to the family name, because the Salian Franks had been the most renowned Frankish group. Their memory was preserved through a Frankish law code, known as the Salic law. Peter H. Wilson states the Salians received their name due to their origins amongst the Franks living along the Rhine in western Franconia, a region "distinguished through its use of Salic law". A less likely etymology links the appellation to the old German word sal ("lordship"), proposing that the name can be traced to the Salian monarchs' well-documented inclination towards hierarchical structures.

The term reges salici (or Salian kings) was most probably coined early in the 12th century. A list of monarchs and archbishops from Mainz, which was completed around 1139–40, is the first extant document to contain it. Bishop Otto of Freising, a maternal descendant of the Salian monarchs, also used the term in his Chronicle or History of the Two Cities in the middle of the 12th century. In a narrow sense, only the four German monarchs who ruled from 1024 to 1125 could be called Salians, but the same appellation has already been expanded to their ancestors by modern historians. An earlier name of the family, appearing in 982, was the Wormsers, due to their main holdings being in the Diocese of Worms.

All male members of the family who were destined to a secular career were named Conrad or Henry. Emperor Conrad II's grandfather, Otto of Worms, established this tradition in the late 10th century. He named his eldest son, Henry of Worms, after his maternal great-grandfather, King Henry the Fowler; and he gave the name of his father, Conrad the Red, to one of his younger sons, Conrad of Carinthia. Conrad the Red was most probably named for King Conrad I of Germany.

== Early Salians ==
Early Salians

CONRADINES	WIDONIDS (?)	OTTONIANS
Conrad I K. of Germany (r. 911–918)	Sister (?)	Werner; C. in Nahegau, Speyergau, Wormsgau	OTTO I †973; Holy Roman Emperor (r. 962–973)	Eadgyth of England †946
Conrad the Red †955; D. of Lothanringia (r. 944/5–953/4)	Luidgard; *931 †953
Otto of Worms †1004; D. of Carinthia (r. 978–985, 1002–1004)	Judith †991
Salian dukes and bishops

=== Werner ===
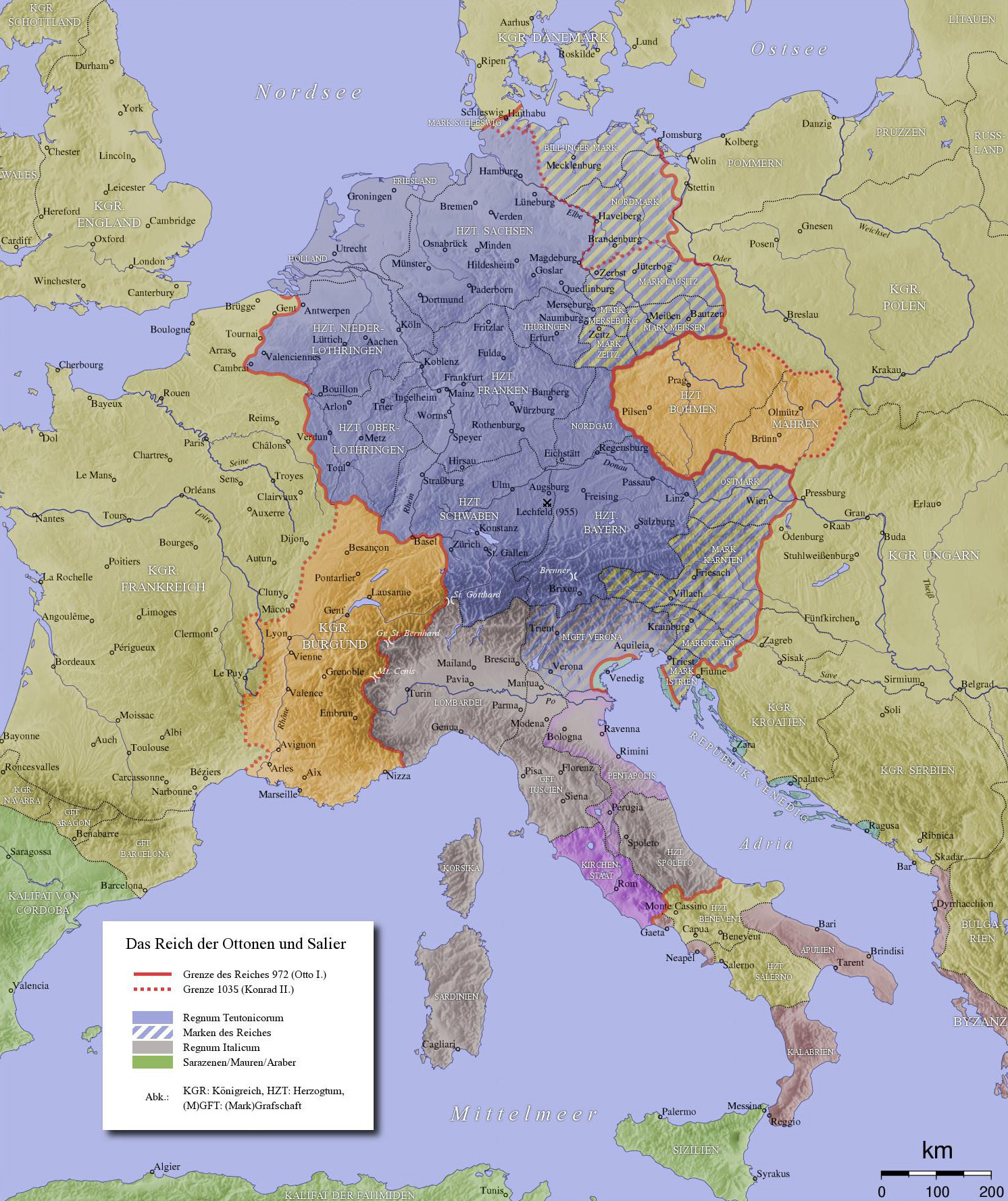
A map of the Holy Roman Empire in the 10th and 11th centuries: Germany (blue), Italy (grey), Burgundy (orange to the West), Bohemia (orange to the East), Papal States (purple).

Count Werner, who held estates in the Nahegau, Speyergau and Wormsgau early in the 10th century, is the Salian monarchs' first certainly identified ancestor. His family links to the Widonids cannot be securely established, but his patrimonial lands and his close relationship with the Hornbach Abbey provide indirect evidence of his Widonid ancestry. He married a kinswoman, most probably a sister, of King Conrad I of Germany. This marriage alliance with the Conradines introduced Conrad as a leading name in his family.

=== Conrad the Red ===
Werner's son, Conrad the Red, inherited his father’s Franconian estates. His family links with the Conradines facilitated his acquisition of large portions of their domains after King Otto I of Germany crushed their revolt in 939. The Conradines lost their preeminent position in Franconia and Conrad the Red emerged as Otto I's principal supporter in the region. He was awarded with the Duchy of Lotharingia in 944 or 945 and he married the King's daughter, Luidgard, in 947.

The marriage forged a link between the royal Ottonian dynasty and the Salians. He lost Lotharingia after he joined a revolt against his father-in-law in 953 or 954. He died fighting against the invading Magyars in the Battle of Lechfeld in 955. The contemporaneous Widukind of Corvey praised him for his bravery. He was buried in the Worms Cathedral, although mainly bishops and kings had so far been buried in cathedrals.

=== Otto of Worms ===
Conrad the Red's son, Otto of Worms, found favour with his maternal grandfather, King Otto I, Holy Roman Emperor from 962. Still a minor, Otto of Worms was mentioned as a count in the Nahegau in 956. He also seized Wormsgau, Speyergau, Niddagau, Elsenzgau, Kraichgau and Pfinzgau, thus uniting almost all lands between the rivers Rhine and Neckar by the time Otto I died in 973. The parentage of his wife, Judith, is uncertain: she may have been related either to Arnulf, Duke of Bavaria, to Count Henry of Arlon, or to Burchard, Margrave in the Eastern Marches.

Otto I's son and successor, Emperor Otto II, was worried about the concentration of lands in his nephew's hands in Franconia. The Emperor appointed Otto of Worms to administer the faraway Duchy of Carinthia and March of Verona in 978. The Emperor persuaded Otto to cede his right to administer justice in Worms, and also parts of his revenues in the town, to the local bishop. Otto was persuaded to renounce Carinthia and Verona, but he was lavishly compensated with a large forest in Wasgau, the royal palace at Kaiserslautern and the proprietary rights over Weissenburg Abbey.

He could also preserve the title of duke, thus becoming the first duke to bear the title without ruling a duchy in Germany. Otto was the cousin of Otto III, Holy Roman Emperor, thus he had a strong claim to the throne after the Emperor's death, but he concluded an agreement with the Ottonian candidate, Henry of Bavaria in 1002. Henry restored Carinthia to Otto in 1002 and he ruled the duchy until his death in 1004.

== Dukes and bishops ==
Salian dukes and bishops

Early Salians
Otto of Worms †1004; D. of Carinthia (r. 978–985, 1002–1004)	Judith †991
Adelaide of Metz †1039/1046	Henry of Worms †990/991 (?)	Pope Gregory V *972 †999 (r. 996–999)	Matilda of Swabia †1031/32	Conrad I †1011; D. of Carinthia (r. 1004–1011)	William †1046/47; B. of Strasbourg (r. 1028/29–1046/47)
Imperial Salians	Conrad II; *1002–05 †1039; D. of Carinthia (r. 1036–1039)	Bruno †1045; B. of Würzburg (r. 1034–1045)

=== Henry of Worms ===
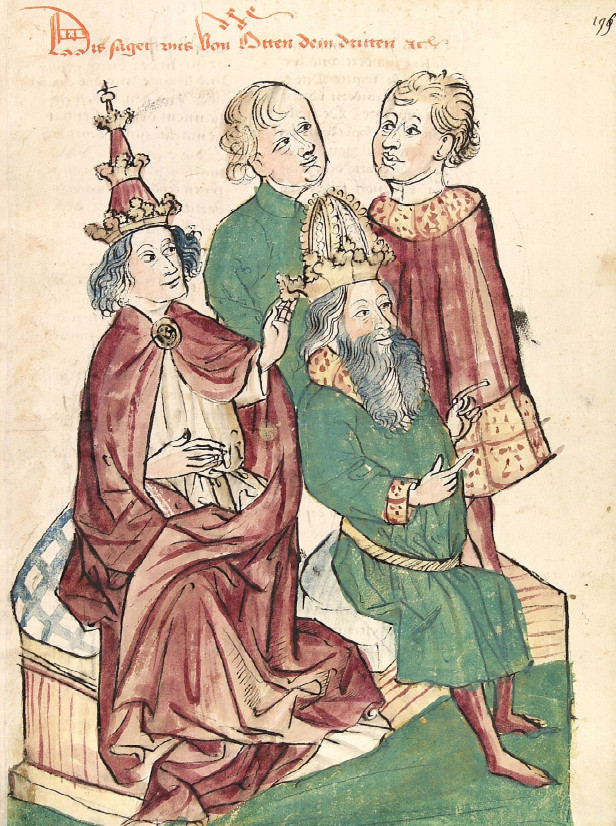
Pope Gregory V anoints Emperor Otto III (a miniature by an unidentified author, c. 1450).

Henry was Otto of Worms's eldest son. His wife, Adelaide, was born into a prominent Lotharingian family, being the daughter of Richard, Count of Metz. Their son, Conrad, would be the first Salian monarch, but Henry could not transfer his seniority rights to his son, because he predeceased his father most probably in 990 or 991.

=== Conrad of Carinthia ===
After Henry of Worms' premature death, his seniority rights shifted to his younger brother, Conrad, enabling him to inherit the major part of the patrimonial lands from his father. Conrad married Matilda, a daughter of Herman II, Duke of Swabia, most probably in 1002. Two years later, he succeeded his father as Duke of Carinthia—the duchy passed from father to son for the first time on this occasion. His rule in Carinthia is poorly documented and he died in 1011.

=== Pope Gregory V ===
Bruno—the future Pope Gregory V—was a younger son of Otto of Worms. His father's cousin, Otto III, placed him on the papal throne in 996, ignoring the provisions of his own Diploma Ottonianum on papal elections. Bruno, who was the first German pope, assumed his papal name in memory of Pope Gregory the Great. He crowned Otto III emperor on the Feast of the Ascension in the same year. The Roman aristocrat Crescentius the Younger expelled him from Rome, but the Emperor crushed the revolt and restored the papal throne to Gregory V. The Pope died at the age of twenty-six or twenty-seven in 999.

=== William of Strasbourg ===
William was Otto of Worms' youngest son. After serving in the royal court as archchaplain to Queen Gisella, William was made bishop of Strasbourg in 1028 or 1029. The see of Strasbourg was one of the wealthiest German bishoprics. His tenure was almost uneventful and he died in 1046 or 1047.

=== Conrad the Younger ===
Conrad, the elder son of Duke Conrad I of Carinthia and Matilda of Swabia, was born between 1002 and 1005. He was underage when his father died in 1011. He inherited his father's patrimonial lands, but Emperor Henry II made Adalbero of Eppelstein the new duke of Carinthia. After Emperor Henry II died in 1024, both Conrad and his cousin, Conrad the Elder, laid claim to the throne and Conrad the Elder was elected the new monarch.

== Imperial Salians ==
=== Conrad II ===
Conrad the Elder was the sole son of Henry of Worms. After his father's premature death, he was placed under the guardianship of Bishop Burchard of Worms. He married Gisela of Swabia in 1016. Both her father Herman II, Duke of Swabia and her mother Gerberga of Burgundy descended from Charlemagne. She was twice widowed. Gisela's first husband Brun I, Count of Brunswick had been a candidate to the imperial throne along with her father and the winning Henry II. Her second husband Ernest succeeded her childless brother Herman III as duke of Swabia.

Conrad the Elder was elected king of Germany against his cousin Conrad the Younger on 4 September 1024. Four days later, he was crowned in the Mainz Cathedral by Archbishop Aribo. On learning of Henry II the citizens of the Italian city Pavia demolished the local royal palace claiming that during the interregnum no king could own the palace. In his response to the rebels, Conrad emphasized that "Even if the king died, the kingdom remaind, just as the ship whose steersman falls remains". A group of Lombard aristocrats offered the throne first to Robert II of France or his eldest son, Hugh Magnus, then to William V, Duke of Aquitaine, but the Lombard bishops and most aristocrats supported Conrad's claim to rule.

After crushing a revolt by his stepson Ernest II, Duke of Swabia and Conrad the Younger in Germany, Conrad marched to Italy. He was crowned king of the Lombards in Milan by Archbishop Aribert probably on 25th March 1026. Resistance against his rule was quickly crushed. He reached Rome where he was crowned Holy Roman Emperor by Pope John XIX on 26th March 1027.

Imperial Salians

Salian dukes and bishops
Adelaide of Metz †1039/46	Henry of Worms †990/91 (?)
Gisela of Swabia *c. 990 †1043	CONRAD II; *990 †1039; Holy Roman Emperor (r. 1027–1039)
Gunhilda of Denmark †1038	HENRY III; *1017 †1056; Holy Roman Emperor (r. 1046–1056)	Agnes of Poitou †1077
Beatrix; *1037 †1061; A. of Quedlinburg and Gandersheim (r. 1044/45–1061)	Adelaide; *1045 †1096; A. of Quedlinburg and Gandersheim (r. 1061–1096)	Rudolf of Rheinfelden †1080; Antiking to Henry IV (r. 1078–1080)	Matilda; *1048 †1060	Bertha of Savoy †1087	HENRY IV; *1050 †1106; Holy Roman Emperor (r. 1084–1105)	Eupraxia of Kiev †1109	Conrad II; *1052 †1055; D. of Bavaria (r. 1054–1055)	Solomon; *1053 †1087; K. of Hungary (r. 1063–1074)	Judit; *1054 †1092/96	Władysław I Herman *c. 1044 †1102; D. of Poland (r. 1079–1102)
Frederick I *c. 1050 †1105; D. of Swabia (r. 1079–1105)	Agnes; *1072/73 †1143	Leopold III; *1073 †1136; M. of Austria (r. 1095–1136)	Maximilla of Sicily	Conrad II; *1074 †1101; K. of Italy (r. 1093–1098)	Matilda of England; *1102 †1167	HENRY V *1086 †1125; Holy Roman Emperor (r. 1111–1125)
HOHENSTAUFENS	BABENBERGS

== Salian monarchy ==
After the death of the last Saxon Emperor Henry II, the first Salian regent, Conrad II, was elected by the majority of the Prince-electors and was crowned German king in Mainz on 8 September 1024. Early in 1026 Conrad went to Milan, where Ariberto, archbishop of Milan, crowned him king of Italy. When Rudolph III, King of Burgundy died in 1032, Conrad II also claimed this kingship on the basis of an inheritance Henry II had extorted from the former in 1006. Despite some opposition, the Burgundian and Provençal nobles paid homage to Conrad in Zürich in 1034. This Kingdom of Burgundy would become known as the Kingdom of Arles from the 12th century.

Already in 1028 Conrad II had his son Henry III elected and anointed king of Germany. Henry's tenure led to an overstatement of previously unknown sacral kingship. So during this reign Speyer Cathedral was expanded to be the largest church in Western Christendom. Henry's conception of a legitimate power of royal disposition in the duchies was successful against the dukes, and thus secured royal control. However, in Lorraine, this led to years of conflict, from which Henry emerged as the winner. However, in southern Germany a powerful opposition group was formed in the years 1052–1055. In 1046 Henry ended the papal schism, freed the Papacy from dependence on the Roman nobility, and laid the basis for its universal applicability. His early death in 1056 was long regarded as a disaster for the Empire.

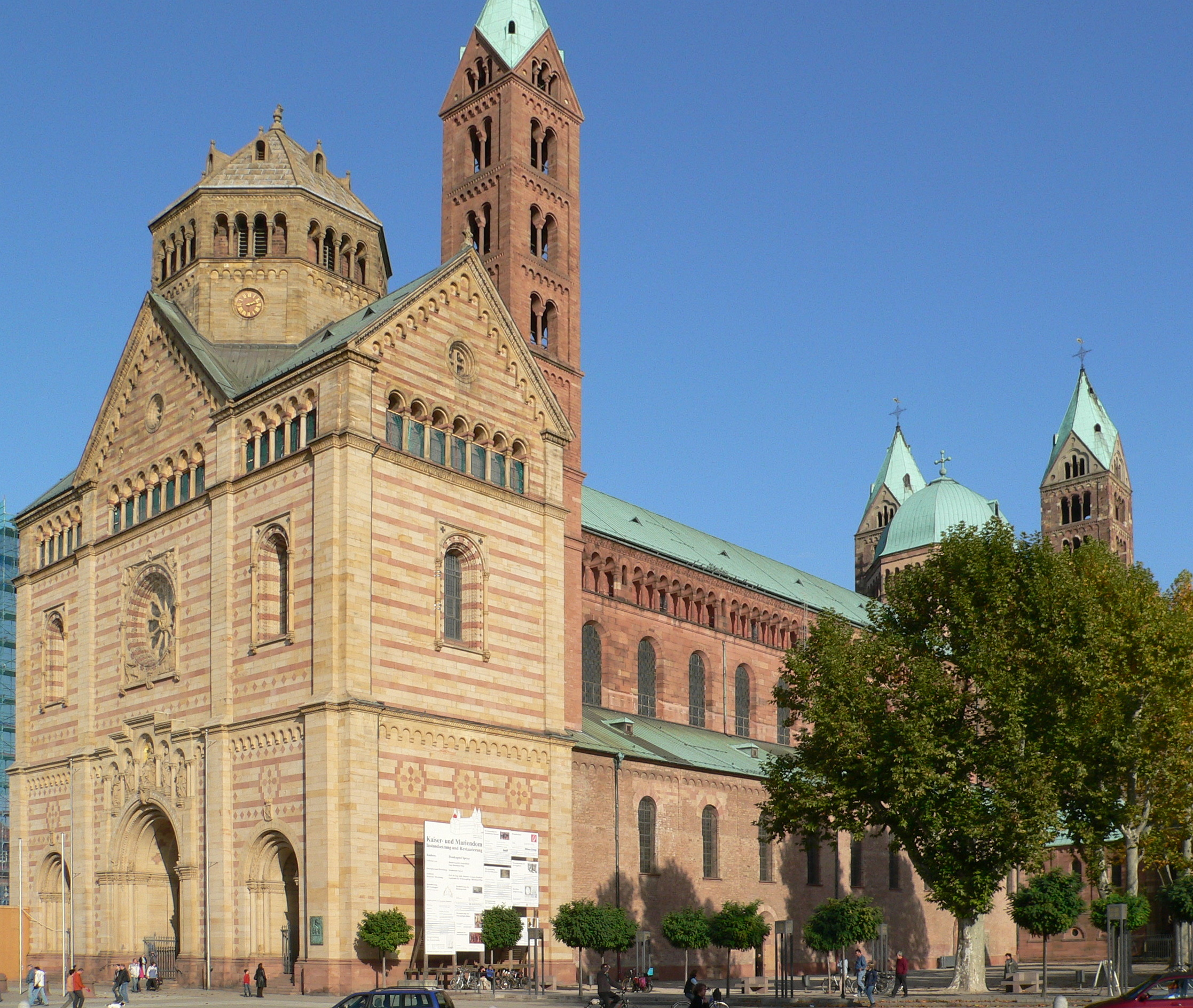
Speyer Cathedral, the burial place of all Salian Emperors

The early Salians owed much of their success to their alliance with the Church, a policy begun by Otto I, which gave them the material support they needed to subdue rebellious dukes. In time, however, the Church came to regret this close relationship. The alliance broke down in 1075 during what came to be known as the Investiture Controversy (or Investiture Dispute), a struggle in which the reformist Pope, Gregory VII, demanded that Emperor Henry IV renounce his rights over the Church in Germany. The pope also attacked the concept of monarchy by divine right and gained the support of significant elements of the German nobility interested in limiting imperial absolutism.

More importantly, the pope forbade ecclesiastical officials under pain of excommunication from supporting Henry as they had so freely done in the past. In the end, Henry IV journeyed to Canossa in northern Italy in 1077 to do penance and to receive absolution from the pope. However, he resumed the practice of lay investiture (appointment of religious officials by civil authorities) and arranged the election of an antipope (Antipope Clement III) in 1080.

The monarch's struggle with the papacy resulted in a war that ravaged through the Holy Roman Empire from 1077 until the Concordat of Worms in 1122. The reign of the last ruler of the Salian dynasty Henry V coincided with the final phase of the great Investiture Controversy, which had pitted pope against emperor. By the settlement of the Concordat of Worms, Henry V surrendered to the demands of the second generation of Gregorian reformers. This agreement stipulated that the pope would appoint high church officials but gave the German king the right to veto the papal choices.

Imperial control of Italy was lost for a time, and the imperial crown became dependent on the political support of competing aristocratic factions. Feudalism became more widespread as freemen sought protection by swearing allegiance to a lord. These powerful local rulers, having thereby acquired extensive territories and large military retinues, took over administration within their territories and organized it around an increasing number of castles. The most powerful of these local rulers came to be called princes rather than dukes.

According to the laws of the feudal system of the Holy Roman Empire, the king had no claims on the vassals of other princes, only on those living within his family's territory. Lacking the support of the formerly independent vassals and weakened by the increasing hostility of the Church, the monarchy lost its pre-eminence. Thus the Investiture Contest strengthened local power in the Holy Roman Empire – in contrast to the trend in France and England, where centralized royal power grew. The Investiture Contest had an additional effect. The long struggle between emperor and pope hurt the Holy Roman Empire's intellectual life, in this period largely confined to monasteries, and the empire no longer led or even kept pace with developments occurring in France and Italy. For instance, no universities were founded in the Holy Roman Empire until the fourteenth century.

The first Hohenstaufen king Conrad III was a grandson of the Salian Henry IV, Holy Roman Emperor. (Agnes, Henry IV's daughter and Henry V's sister, was the heiress to the Salian dynasty's lands: her first marriage produced the royal and imperial Hohenstaufen dynasty and her second marriage the ducal Babenberg potentates of the Duchy of Austria, which was elevated much due to these connections via the Privilegium Minus.)

== Salian Kings and Emperors ==
- Conrad II 1024–1039, crowned emperor on 26 March 1027
- Henry III 1039–1056, crowned emperor on 25 December 1046
- Henry IV 1056–1106, crowned emperor on 31 March 1084
  - Conrad (III) 1087–1098, nominal king under his father Henry IV
- Henry V 1106–1125, crowned emperor on 13 April 1111

Their regnal dates as emperor take into account elections and subsequent coronations.

== See also ==
- The Salian Law

== General references ==
- Schutz, Herbert (2010). The Medieval Empire in Central Europe: Dynastic Continuity in the Post-Carolingian Frankish Realm, 900–1300. Cambridge Scholars Publishing. ISBN 978-1-4438-1966-4.
- Weinfurter, Stefan (1999) [1992]. The Salian Century: Main Currents in an Age of Transition. Translated by Kaiser, Denise A. University of Pennsylvania Press. ISBN 0-8122-3508-8.
- Wilson, Peter H. (2016). The Holy Roman Empire: A Thousand Years of Europe's History. Allen Lane. ISBN 978-1-8461-4318-2.
- Wolfram, Herwig (2006) [2000]. Conrad II, 990–1039: Emperor of Three Kingdoms. Translated by Bowlus, Barbara M. The Pennsylvania State University Press. ISBN 0-271-02738-X.
