= Otto I of Carinthia =

Duke of Carinthia (c. 950 - 1004)

Otto of Worms
- Duke of Carinthia
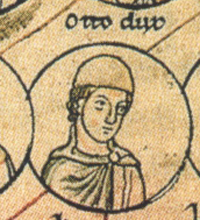
- Depiction in Chronica sancti Pantaleonis, c. 1237
- Born: c. 950
- Died: 4 November 1004 (aged 53–54)
- Buried: Bruchsal (?)
- Noble family: Salian dynasty
- Spouse: Judith of Carinthia
- Issue: Henry of Speyer; Pope Gregory V Conrad I, Duke of Carinthia
- Father: Conrad, Duke of Lorraine
- Mother: Liutgarde of Saxony

Otto I (c. 950 – 4 November 1004), called Otto of Worms, a member of the Salian dynasty, was Duke of Carinthia from 978 to 985 and again from 1002 until his death.

== Biography ==
Otto was the only son of Liutgarde, daughter of Emperor Otto I, and Conrad the Red, duke of Lotharingia. Otto's mother died three years after he was born and Otto lived much of his early life in his grandfather's court until the emperor's death in 973. His maternal uncle, Otto II, ascended the Imperial throne.

Otto of Worms is first documented as a count in the Nahegau about 956. He also held the Speyergau and Wormsgau, as well as several other counties in the area. In 978, Emperor Otto II appointed him duke of Carinthia and margrave of Verona, after his Luitpolding predecessor, Henry the Younger, had unsuccessfully rebelled against the Imperial authority during the War of the Three Henries and was deposed. In 985, however, Emperor Otto's widow, Empress Theophanu, in order to gain support for the succession of their minor son, Otto III, restored Carinthia to the Luitpoldings, and Otto lost the duchy. He retained the ducal title as "duke of Worms", received the Kaiserpfalz of Lautern and seized large estates of Wissembourg (Weißenburg) Abbey in compensation.

Upon the death of Duke Henry II of Bavaria in 995, Otto again received the Duchy of Carinthia (Note: Some sources state Otto was not restored to his duchy until 1002) and the March of Verona. When Emperor Otto III died in 1002, Otto of Worms and Duke Henry IV of Bavaria were candidates for the new king of Germany; Otto withdrew from the election and received the Duchy of Carinthia from Henry in return. Nevertheless, he was forced to cede his Rhenish possessions to his long-time rival Bishop Burchard of Worms.

Otto died two years later, he was succeeded as Carinthian duke by his son, Conrad.

== Family ==
Otto married Judith (died 991), probably a granddaughter of Duke Arnulf the Bad of Bavaria. They had the following known children:

- Henry of Speyer (died before 1000), Count in the Wormsgau
- Pope Gregory V (died 999)
- Conrad I, Duke of Carinthia (1004–1011)
- William, Bishop of Strasbourg (1028–1047)

== Sources ==
- Brooke, Christopher (2014). Europe in the Central Middle Ages: 962-1154. Routledge.
- Gwatkin, Henry Melvill; Whitney, James Pounder; Tanner, Joseph Robson; Previté-Orton, Charles William; Brooke, Zachary Nugent, eds. (1922). The Cambridge Medieval History. Vol. 3. The Macmillan Company.
- Jackman, Donald C. (2012). The Kleeberg Fragment of the Gleiberg County. Editions Enlaplage.
- Jeep, John M., ed. (2001). Medieval Germany: An Encyclopedia. Routledge.
- Reuter, Timothy (2013). Germany in the Early Middle Ages C. 800-1056. Routledge.
- Wilson, Peter H. (2016). Heart of Europe: A History of the Holy Roman Empire. Harvard University Press.

Preceded by Henry I	Duke of Carinthia; 978–985	Succeeded by Henry I
Preceded by Henry III	Duke of Carinthia; 1002–1004	Succeeded by Conrad I
