= Ufgau =

Former county in Franconia

Coordinates: 48°51′58.4928″N 8°20′20.6102″E

Ufgau (Old High German Ufgowe, Uffgau; Usgau, Osgau; pagus auciacensis) was a historical county (gowe) of the duchy of Franconia, along the Oos River and the lower Murg, delimited to the south by the counties of Albgau and Ortenau. It was part of the bishopric of Speyer. Modern cities located in the territory of Ufgau include Baden-Baden, Rastatt and Karlsruhe.

The county was ruled by members of the Conradine dynasty in the 10th century, passing to the Reginbodones in the 11th. Within the Holy Roman Empire, Ufgau became part of the Margraviate of Baden in the early 12th century.

Counts of Ufgau:

- Gebhard (d. after 947), joined the Conradines to the Carolingian lineage of Vermandois as he married a daughter of Herbert I in 940.
- Conrad I, Duke of Swabia (d. 997), grandson of Gebhard
- Adalbert (fl. 1041)
- Reginbodo I (fl. 1057)
- Reginbodo II (fl. 1110–1115)

== Literature ==
- Urte Schulz: Zwischen Alb und Oos - Ein Sagenführer. Auf Spurensuche alter Sagen und Geschichten im Ufgau, Verlag Regionalkultur, Ubstadt-Weiher, ISBN 978-3-89735-484-5
