= Rhenish Franconia =

Western half of the central German stem duchy of Franconia in the 10th and 11th century

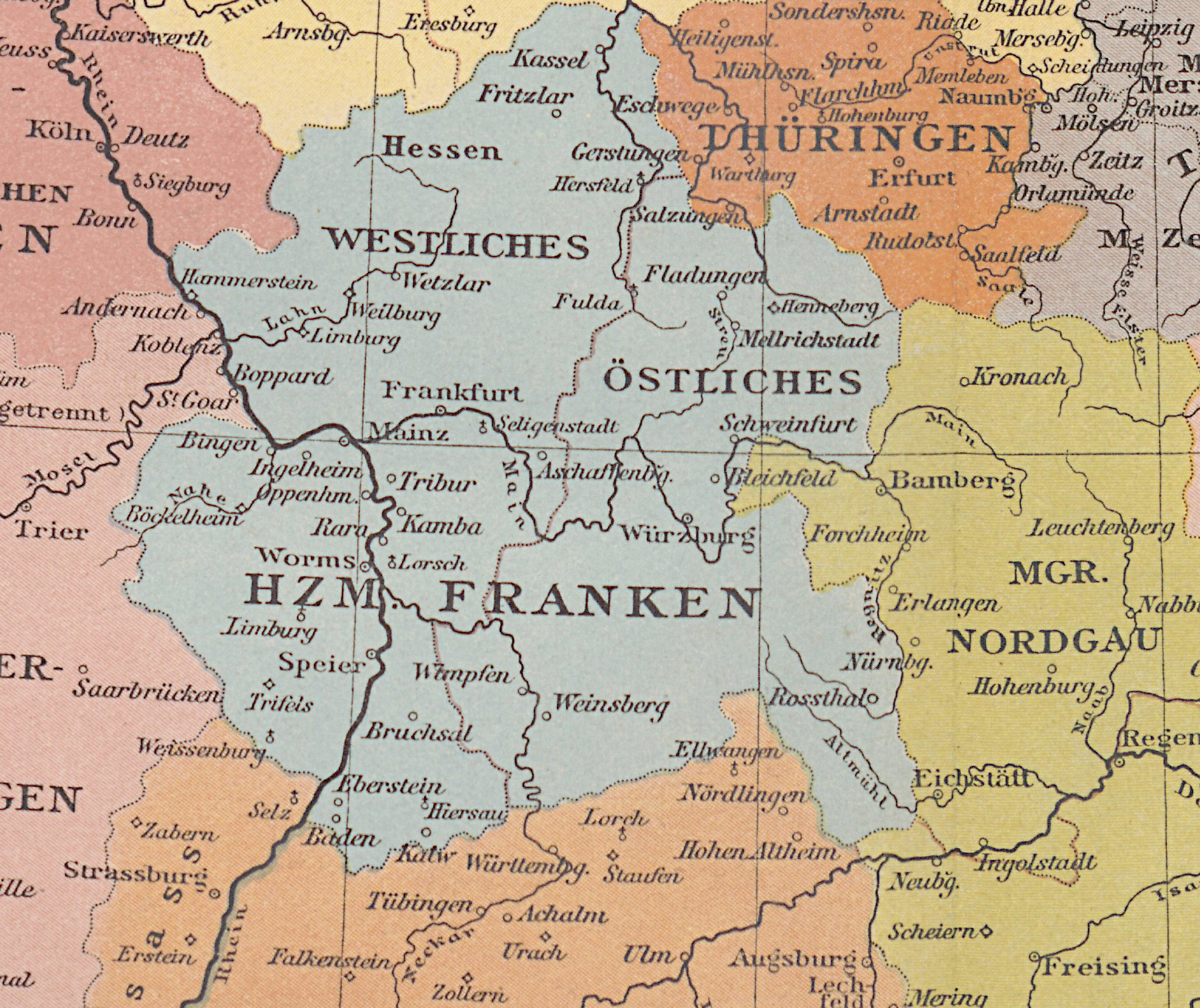
Western and Eastern Franconia, at about 800

Rhenish Franconia (German: Rheinfranken) or Western Franconia (German: Westfranken) denotes the western half of the central German stem duchy of Franconia in the 10th and 11th century, with its residence at the city of Worms. The territory located on the banks of Rhine river roughly corresponded with the present-day state of Hesse and the adjacent Palatinate region in the south.

== History ==
The Franconian stem duchy, part of former Frankish Austrasia, was seized by King Otto I of Germany after the unsuccessful revolt of the Conradine duke Eberhard had shattered at the 939 Battle of Andernach. With the advancement of Count Conrad the Red, Rhenish Franconia became the heartland of the Imperial Salian dynasty, which provided four emperors in the 11th and 12th centuries: Conrad II, Henry III, Henry IV, and Henry V. It contained the ancient cities of Mainz, Speyer and Worms, the latter two being the administrative centres of countships within the hands of the Salian descendants of Conrad the Red. These counts were sometimes referred to informally, on account of the great power in the region, as dukes of Franconia.

When Emperor Conrad II died in 1039, Rhenish Franconia was governed as a constellation of small states, like the cities of Frankfurt, Speyer and Worms, the Prince-bishoprics of Mainz, Speyer, and Worms, as well as the Landgraviate of Hesse, then part of Thuringia. Alongside these powerful entities there were many smaller, petty states. In 1093, Emperor Henry IV gave the Salian territories in Rhenish Franconia as a fief to Henry of Laach, the Count palatine of Lower Lorraine at Aachen, his lands then would evolve into the important principality of the Electoral Palatinate. While Emperor Frederick Barbarossa in 1168 granted the ducal title to the Prince-Bishops of Würzburg in Eastern Franconia, Rhenish Franconia was divided and extinguished. Its territories became part of the Imperial Upper Rhenish Circle in 1500.

== Successor states of Western Franconia ==
The following are the most important states that had formed on the territory of Western (or Rhenish) Franconia by the 13th century:

- Archbishopric of Mainz
- Bishopric of Speyer
- Abbacy of Hersfeld
- Margraviate of Baden
- County Palatine of the Rhine
- County of Calw
- Landgraviate of Hesse
- County of Katzenelnbogen
- County of Leiningen
- County of Nassau
- County of Nidda
- County of Wetterau
- Raugraviate
- Rhinegraviate
- County of Solms
- County of Sponheim
- County of Veldenz
- County of Waldeck
- County of Weissenburg
- County of Wied
- Wild County
- County of Wittgenstein
- County of Ziegenhain
- County of Zweibrücken

== Modern Franconia ==
The eastern half of the historic duchy of Franconia on the Main river around the city of Würzburg and Nuremberg forms the modern Franconian region of northern Bavaria; the Würzburg bishops retained the title of "Duke of Franconia".

== Literature ==
- (in German) Meyers Konversationslexikon. S. 902f. Leipzig 1897 (Karte von Ostfranken und Westfranken in "Deutschland um 1000")
- (in German) Herzogtümer Ost- und Rheinfranken. In: Meyers Konversations-Lexikon. 4th edition. Volume 6, Verlag des Bibliographischen Instituts, Leipzig/Vienna 1885–1892, p. 491.
