= Chronica sancti Pantaleonis =

Medieval Latin universal history

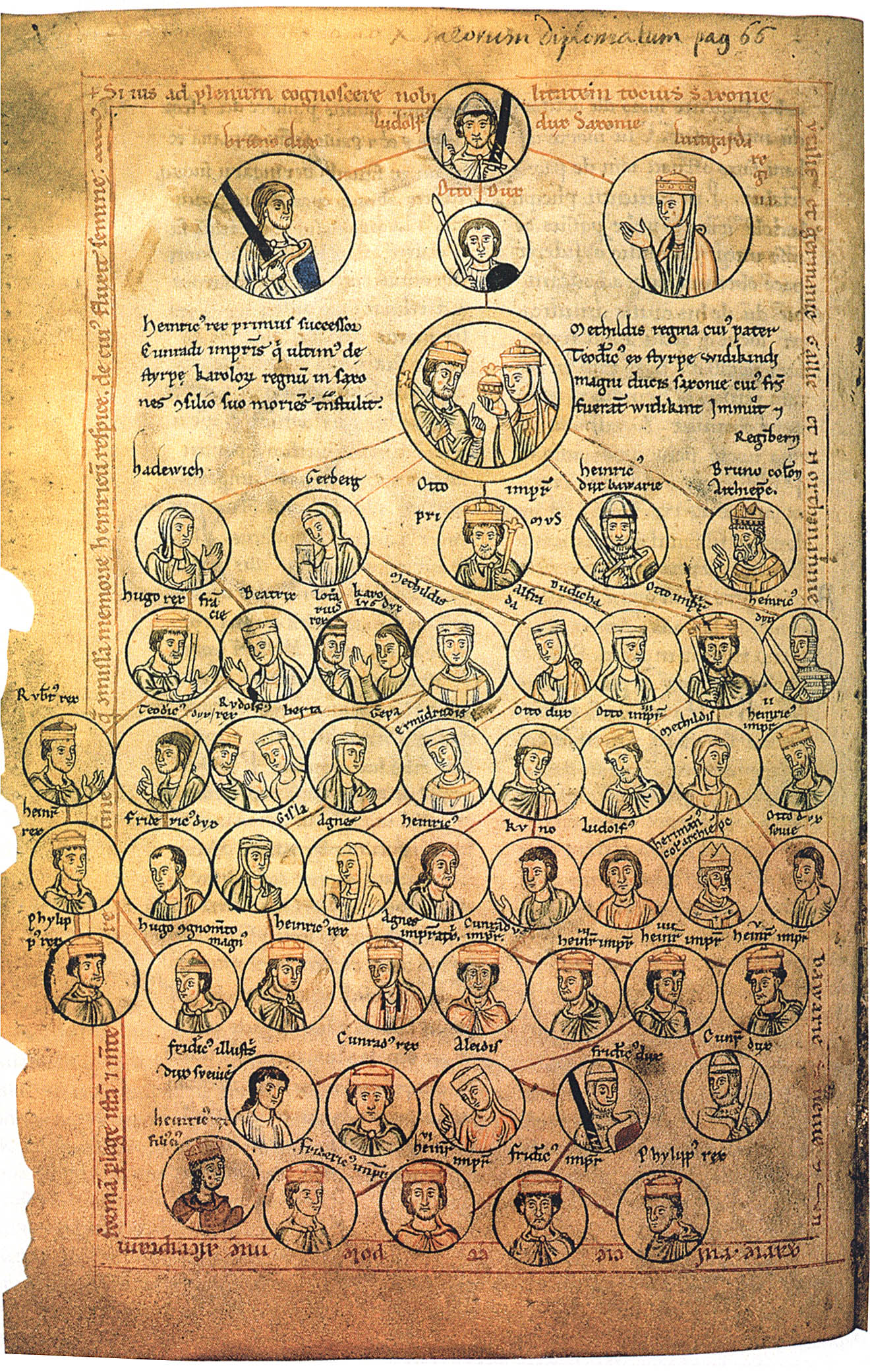
Family tree of the Ottonians, from the Wolfenbüttel manuscript (Cod. Guelf. 74.3 Aug., p. 226)

The Chronica sancti Pantaleonis, also called the Annales sancti Panthaleonis Coloniensis maximi, is a medieval Latin universal history written at the Benedictine monastery of Saint Pantaleon in Cologne. It was written in 1237 and covers the history of the world in a series of annals from Creation down to the year of composition. A continuation down to 1249 was added later. Up to the year 1199 it relies heavily on other sources; from 1200 it is an independent source.

The Chronica emphasises the four "great kingdoms" of Daniel (the regna maxima). For ancient history, it relies on Flavius Josephus, Paulus Orosius, Justinus, the Venerable Bede, Regino of Prüm and Petrus Comestor. For more recent events in Germany the annalist used the Chronicon universale of Frutolf von Michelsberg, the chronicle of Ekkehard von Aura and the Chronica regia Coloniensis.

The manuscripts from Brussels and Wolfenbüttel are richly illustrated with images of rulers and genealogical trees. The Chronica does not seem to have circulated widely outside of the region around Cologne.

== Sources ==
- Israel, Uwe. "Chronica S. Pantaleonis." Encyclopedia of the Medieval Chronicle. Graeme Dunphy, ed. Brill Online, 2013.
