= Pope Gregory V =

Head of the Catholic Church from 996 to 999

- Bishop of Rome
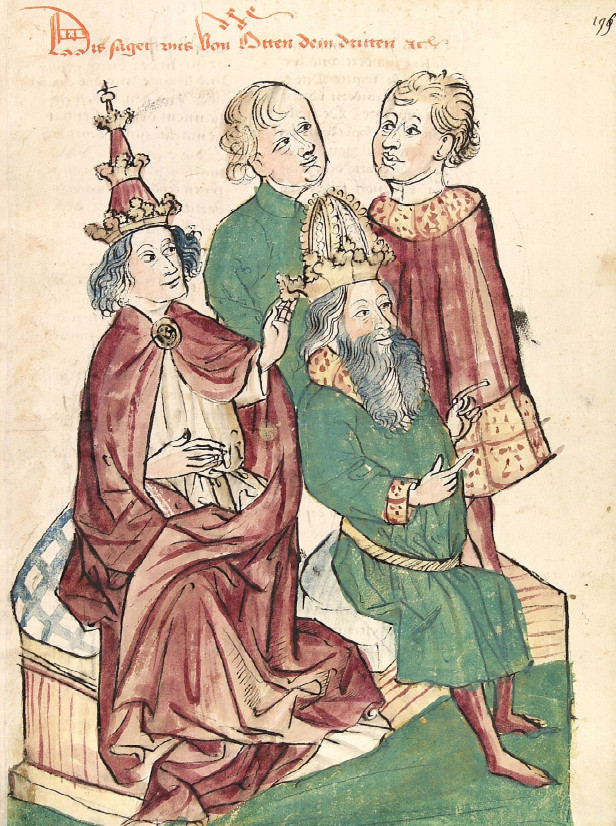
- Gregory V (left) anoints Otto III as Holy Roman Emperor (anachronistic drawing c. 1450; popes in the 10th century wore a white cap, not a papal tiara)
- Church: Catholic Church
- Papacy began: 3 May 996
- Papacy ended: 18 February 999
- Predecessor: John XV
- Successor: Sylvester II

Orders
- Created cardinal: 995

Personal details
- Born: Bruno of Carinthia c. 972 Stainach, Duchy of Carinthia, Holy Roman Empire
- Died: 18 February 999 (aged c. 27) Rome, Papal States
- Buried: St. Peter's Basilica
- Parents: Otto I, Duke of Carinthia; Judith of Carinthia

Pope Gregory V (Latin: Gregorius V; c. 972 – 18 February 999), born Bruno of Carinthia, was the bishop of Rome and ruler of the Papal States from 3 May 996 to his death. A member of the Salian dynasty, he was made pope by his cousin, Emperor Otto III.

== Family ==
Bruno was a son of Otto I, Duke of Carinthia, a member of the Salian dynasty who was a grandson of Otto I, Holy Roman Emperor, and his wife, Judith of Carinthia, most likely a member of the Luitpolding dynasty. He is the only pope who was born in modern Austria, and is sometimes referred to as "the first German pope" or as "the only Austrian pope". German and Austrian identities were not clearly differentiated at the time of Gregory's life.

== Papal election ==
Bruno was the chaplain of his cousin, Emperor Otto III, who presented him as a candidate and arranged his election. Bruno was elected and succeeded John XV as pope, taking the name Gregory V to honour Pope Gregory the Great; he thus became the first pope to choose a regnal name for a reason other than avoiding a name that was too pagan or that of Saint Peter. He is often counted as the first German pope (or the second if Boniface II, an Ostrogoth, is counted). Following Otto's return to Germany, Gregory was forced to flee Rome, after the election of antipope John XVI, whom Crescentius II and the nobles of Rome had chosen against the will of Otto III.

== Policies ==
Politically, Gregory acted consistently as the Emperor's representative in Rome and granted many exceptional privileges to monasteries within the Holy Roman Empire. One of his first acts was to crown Otto III emperor on 21 May 996. Together, they held a synod a few days after the coronation in which Arnulf, Archbishop of Reims, was ordered to be restored to his See of Reims, and Gerbert of Aurillac, was condemned as an intruder. King Robert II of France, who had been insisting on his right to appoint bishops, was ultimately obliged to retract his claim, and also to put aside his wife, Bertha of Burgundy, by the rigorous enforcement of a sentence of excommunication on the kingdom.

Until the conclusion of the council of Pavia in 997, John XVI and Crescentius were in possession of Rome. The revolt of Crescentius II was decisively suppressed by Otto III, who marched upon Rome. John XVI fled, and Crescentius shut himself up in the Castel Sant'Angelo. The Emperor's troops pursued the antipope, captured him, cut off his nose and ears, cut out his tongue, blinded him, and publicly degraded him before Otto III and Gregory V. When the much respected St. Nilus of Rossano castigated both the Emperor and Pope for their cruelty, John XVI was sent to the monastery of Fulda in Germany, where he lived until c. 1001. The Castel Sant'Angelo was besieged, and when it was taken in 998, Crescentius was hanged upon its walls.

== Death ==
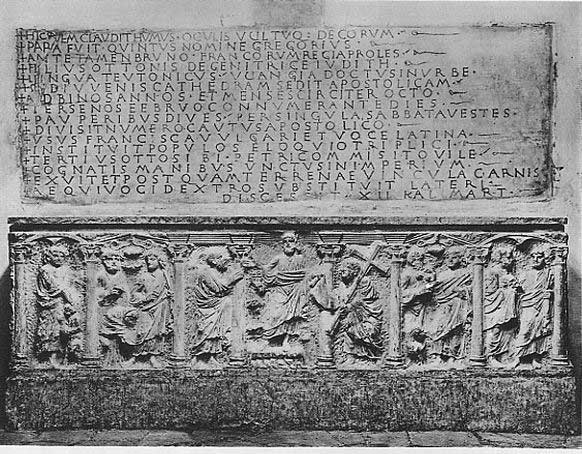
Tomb of Pope Gregory V

Pope Gregory V died suddenly on 18 February 999, at around 27 years old. The exact cause of his death is not known. Some later writers suggested he may have been poisoned, but there is no strong evidence to support this, and most modern historians treat it as uncertain.

He was buried in St. Peter’s Basilica in Rome, near the tomb of Pope Pelagius I. His original tomb no longer exists, as it was likely removed during major rebuilding work on the basilica in the 16th century. However, records from that time mention his epitaph and burial location.

Gregory was succeeded by Gerbert of Aurillac, who took the name Pope Sylvester II. This helped continue the strong connection between the papacy and the Holy Roman Empire under Emperor Otto III.

== Legacy ==
Pope Gregory V’s time as pope was important in the growing connection between the papacy and the Holy Roman Empire during the late 10th century. As the first pope from what is now Austria and Germany, his election showed how much influence the Ottonian emperors had over the Church at that time.

Pope Gregory V worked closely with his cousin, Emperor Otto III, and supported imperial policies in Church matters. He gave special rights to many monasteries in the empire and took part in settling disputes over who should be bishops, including in the important cities of Reims and Canterbury.

Many historians see Pope Gregory V as a figure who represented a turning point in the Church's history. His reign highlighted the close ties between the papacy and the empire, but also the problems that came with that relationship. Some of the issues that arose during his papacy, such as disputes over Church appointments and papal authority, would become major topics in later Church reforms

== See also ==
- List of Popes
- List of Popes by Country
- Papacy
- Prophecy of the Popes
- Papal name

== Sources ==
- Baumgartner, Frederic J. (2003). Behind Locked Doors: A History of the Papal Elections. Palgrave Macmillan.
- Brooke, Christopher (2014). Europe in the Central Middle Ages: 962-1154. Routledge.
- Duckett, Eleanor Shipley (1988). Death and Life in the Tenth Century. University of Michigan Press.
- Glenn, Jason (2004). Politics and History in the Tenth Century: The Work and World of Richer of Reims. Cambridge University Press.
- Levillain, Philippe, ed. (2002). The Papacy: An Encyclopedia. Routledge.
- McBrien, Richard P. (2000). Lives of the Popes: The Pontiffs from St. Peter to Benedict XVI. HarperCollins Publishers.
- Kalik, Judith; Uchitel, Alexander (2019). Slavic Gods and Heroes. Routledge.
- Collins, Roger (2001). Keepers Of The Keys Of Heaven: A History Of The Papacy. Basic Books.
- Kitchin, William P.H. (1922). "A Pope-Philosopher of the Tenth Century: Sylvester II (Gerbert of Aurillac)". The Catholic Historical Review. 8 (1, April). Catholic University of America Press: 42–54.

Pope Gregory V Salian dynasty Born: 972 Died: 999
Catholic Church titles
Preceded by John XV	Pope; 996–999	Succeeded by Sylvester II
