= Conrad, Duke of Lorraine =

Franconian noble (c. 922–955)

Conrad the Red
- Duke of Lorraine
- Reign: 944–953
- Born: c. 922
- Died: 10 August 955; Lechfeld plain, near Augsburg, Bavaria
- Buried: Worms Cathedral
- Noble family: Salian dynasty
- Spouse: Liutgarde of Saxony
- Issue: Otto I, Duke of Carinthia
- Father: Werner V
- Mother: Hicha of Swabia

Conrad (c. 922 – 10 August 955), called the Red (German: Konrad der Rote), was Duke of Lorraine from 944 until 953. He became the progenitor of the Imperial Salian dynasty.

== Life ==
He was the son of Werner V (died about 935), a Franconian count in the Nahegau, Speyergau, and Wormsgau territories on the Upper Rhine. His mother presumably was Hicha, a daughter of the Hunfriding duke Burchard II of Swabia and his wife Regelinda of Zürich. The descent of Count Werner V, the first documented Salian, is uncertain; he probably was related to the Frankish Widonid dynasty, his father, Werner IV (Walaho), was married to an unknown sister of King Conrad I of Germany.

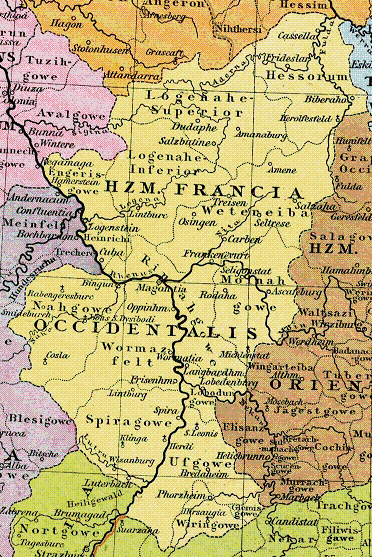
Rhenish Franconia, about 1000

In 941, Conrad appeared as his father's successor in the Rhenish counties and obtained additional territory in the Wetterau on the right bank of the Rhine. Conrad took his residence at Worms and rivalled with Archbishop Frederick of Mainz for supremacy in Rhenish Franconia. The Salian counts had been able to strengthen their position in the Franconian lands, while their Conradine relatives had failed to maintain the royal dignity upon King Conrad's death in 918 and the rise of the Ottonian dynasty. The late king's younger brother Eberhard was able to succeed him as Duke of Franconia and was temporarily enfeoffed with the Lotharingian duchy, nevertheless he joined the revolt of Duke Gilbert of Lorraine against the rule of King Otto I of Germany and was killed at the 939 Battle of Andernach.

While Lotharingia passed to Otto's younger brother Henry, Conrad the Red remained a loyal supporter of King Otto and acted as Franconian regent after Duke Eberhard's death, with some chance to obtain the ducal title. He also helped to ensure the waiver of Lotharingia by the West Frankish king Louis IV and also to uncover a plot by the king's brother Henry on Otto's life. In turn, the adolescens was vested with Lotharingia in 944. Rejected by the local nobility, however, he remained dependent on the king's support. About three years later, he married Liutgarde (d. 953), Otto's daughter with his first wife Edith of Wessex, a daughter of the English king Edward the Elder. He and Liutgard had one son, Otto of Worms, born in 948, later Duke of Carinthia.

Conrad proved his talent, in 951 he accompanied King Otto on his first Italian campaign and entered into negotiations with King Berengar II, who by his agency appeared at the 952 Imperial Diet in Augsburg and paid homage to the German king. Conrad, however, was duped by his king, when Otto took the occasion to additionally enforce the cession of the Italian March of Verona to his brother Henry. The next year, Conrad therefore joined his brother-in-law, Duke Liudolf of Swabia, in rebellion against King Otto, who, according to the chronicler Widukind of Corvey, bitterly complained about Conrad's ingratitude. The revolt reached large circles, it nevertheless was quashed after the insurgents began to deal with hostile Hungarian forces. Liudolf and Conrad were deprived of their duchies at the Diet of Fritzlar and Lotharingia was instead granted to the king's own brother, Archbishop Bruno of Cologne, while Conrad was immediately driven out by the local nobles. Eventually, the Salian submitted to Otto at Langenzenn and both were reconciled. Conrad retained his estates; however, he never regained the ducal title. In 954 he participated in a successful campaign of Margrave Gero against the Slavic Ukrani tribes in the Uckerland.

Conrad the Red was killed in the 955 Battle of Lechfeld near Augsburg, while fighting under King Otto as commander of the Franconian contingent against the invading Hungarian forces. According to Widukind of Corvey:

"Duke Conrad, the foremost of all in combat, suffering from battle fatigue caused by an unusually hot sun, loosened the straps of his armor to catch his breath when an arrow pierced his throat and killed him instantly."

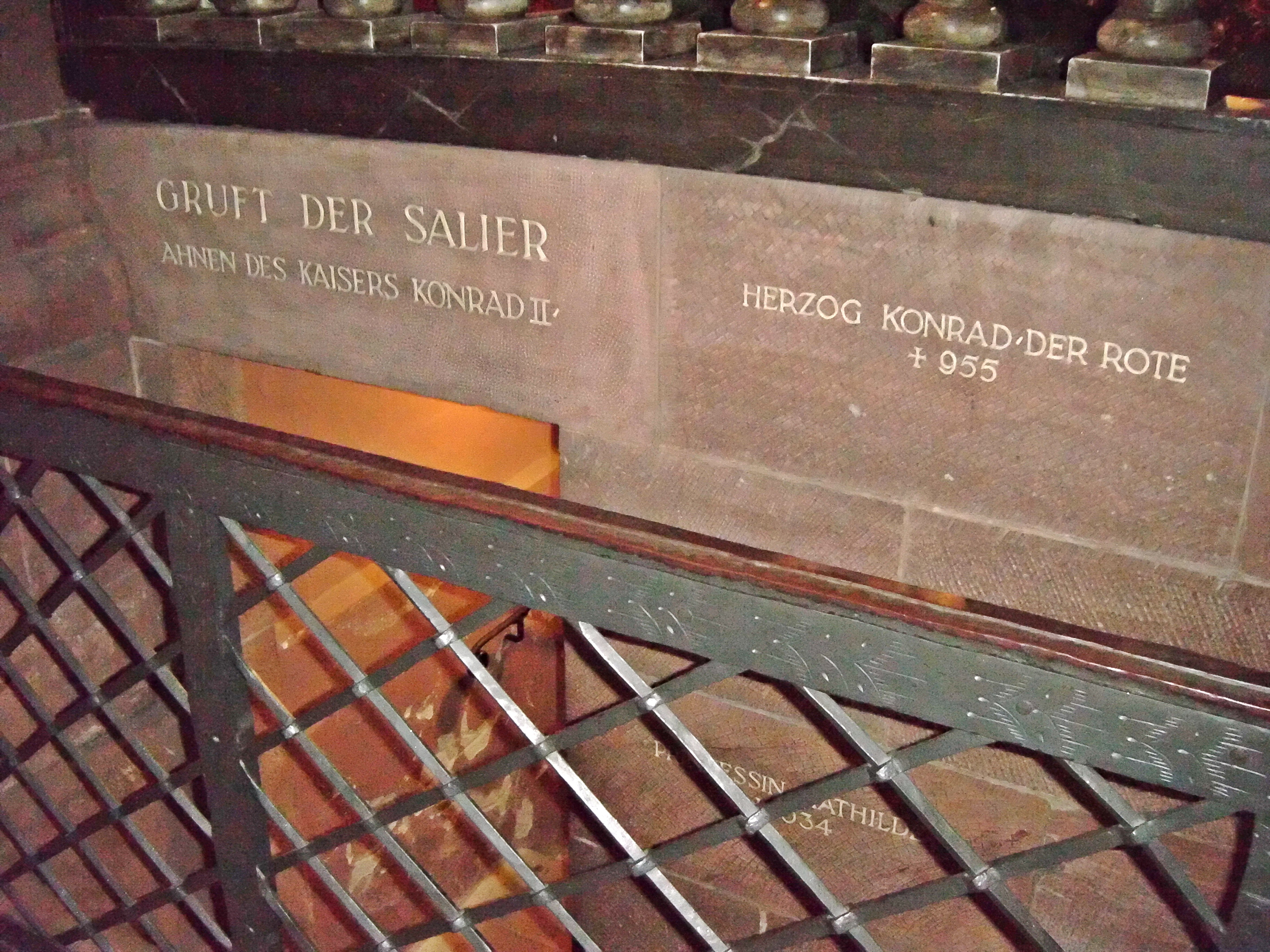
Entry to the Salian Crypt in Worms Cathedral

Conrad's body was carried in state to Worms, where he was given a lavish funeral and buried at Worms Cathedral by his son and heir Otto. This kind of extraordinary burial was at this time a privilege of bishops and kings. Conrad was the great-grandfather of Conrad II, Holy Roman Emperor.

== Sources ==
- Widukind (of Corvey) (2014). Deeds of the Saxons. Translated by Bachrach, Bernard S.; Bachrach, David S. The Catholic University of America Press.
- Prutz, Hans (1905). The Age of Charlemagne. Vol. VIII. Translated by Wright, John Henry. Lea Brothers & Company.
- Wolfram, Herwig (2015). "Conrad II (990-1039), the First Medieval Emperor of Three Kingdoms". In Halfond, Gregory I. (ed.). The Medieval Way of War: Studies in Medieval Military History in Honor of Bernard S. Bachrach. Ashgate Publishing Limited.

Conrad, Duke of Lorraine Salian dynasty Born: c. 922 Died: 955
Regnal titles
Preceded by Otto of Verdun	Duke of Lorraine; 944–953	Succeeded by Bruno the Great
