= Pfinz =

River in Germany

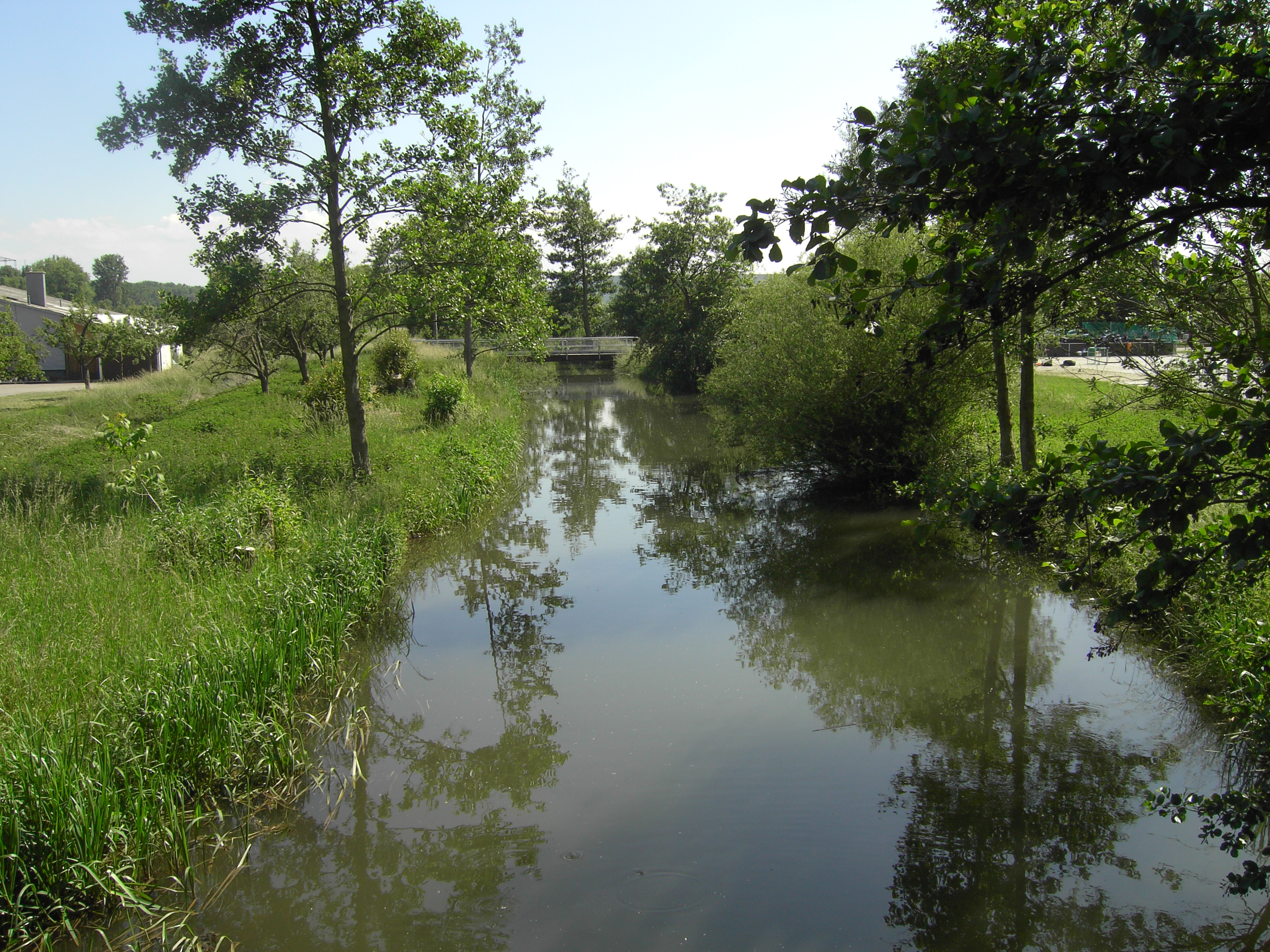

Location
- Country: Germany
- State: Baden-Württemberg

Physical characteristics
- Source
  - location: Black Forest
  - elevation: approx. 450 m (1,480 ft)
- Mouth
  - location: Rhine
  - coordinates: 49°11′35″N 8°24′35″E
- Length: 60.4 km (37.5 mi)
- Basin size: 362 km^{2} (140 sq mi)

Basin features
- Progression: Rhine→ North Sea

The Pfinz is a right tributary of the Rhine in Baden-Württemberg. Its origin is located at the northern edge of the Black Forest near the Straubenhardt borough of Pfinzweiler. Near Durlach it enters the Upper Rhine Plain and continues, splitting into several beds and canals, in northwesterly direction through several towns and villages north of Karlsruhe for example Staffort. The Pfinz discharges into the Rhine near Dettenheim-Rußheim. Over the course of its path the Pfinz crosses underneath two canals: one near the Karlsruhe borough of Hagsfeld and one by Dettenheim-Rußheim.

The river flows through Pfinztal and lent its name to the town of Pfinztal. The town was created by combining four previously independent villages on or near the Pfinz during the Baden-Württemberg district reform in the 1970s.

The area along the river is traditionally referred to as the Pfinzgau.
