= Conrad II, Holy Roman Emperor =

Holy Roman Emperor from 1027 to 1039

Conrad II
- Imperator Romanorum
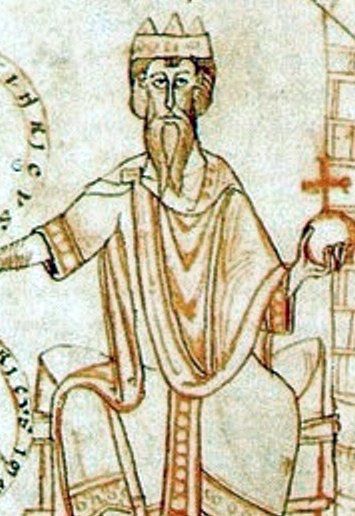
- Miniature depiction, c. 1130

Holy Roman Emperor
- Reign: 26 March 1027 – 4 June 1039
- Coronation: 26 March 1027; Old St. Peter's Basilica, Rome
- Predecessor: Henry II
- Successor: Henry III

King of Burgundy
- Reign: 6 September 1032 – 4 June 1039
- Predecessor: Rudolph III
- Successor: Henry III

King of Italy
- Reign: 25 March 1026 – 4 June 1039
- Coronation: 25 March 1026; Basilica of Sant'Ambrogio, Milan
- Predecessor: Henry II
- Successor: Henry III

King of Germany
- Reign: 8 September 1024 – 4 June 1039
- Coronation: 8 September 1024; Mainz Cathedral, Mainz
- Predecessor: Henry II
- Successor: Henry III
- Born: c. 990; Speyer, Duchy of Franconia, Kingdom of Germany, Holy Roman Empire
- Died: 4 June 1039 (aged 48–49); Utrecht, Lower Lorraine, Kingdom of Germany, Holy Roman Empire
- Burial: Speyer Cathedral
- Spouse: Gisela of Swabia (m. 1016)
- Issue: Henry III, Holy Roman Emperor; Matilda of Franconia
- House: Salian
- Father: Henry, Count of Speyer
- Mother: Adelaide of Metz
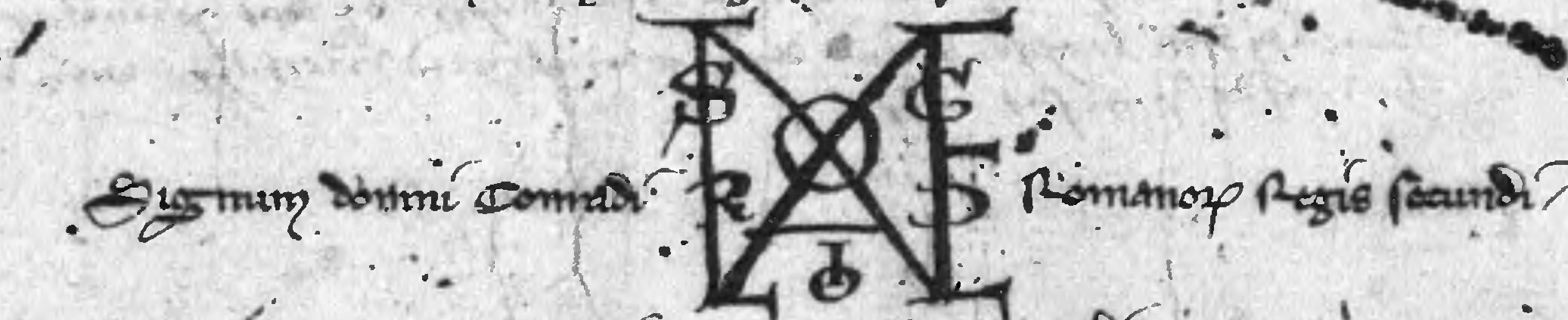
- Signature

Conrad II (German: Konrad II, c. 990 – 4 June 1039), also known as Conrad the Elder and Conrad the Salic, was the emperor of the Holy Roman Empire from 1027 until his death in 1039. The first of a succession of four Salian emperors, who reigned for one century until 1125, Conrad ruled the kingdoms of Germany (from 1024), Italy (from 1026) and Burgundy (from 1033).

The son of Franconian count Henry of Speyer (also Henry of Worms) and Adelaide of Metz of the Matfriding dynasty, that had ruled the Duchy of Lorraine from 959 until 972, Conrad inherited the titles of count of Speyer and Worms during childhood after his father had died around the year 990, two major towns near each other on the Rhine. He extended his influence beyond his inherited lands, as he came into favour of the princes of the kingdom. When the imperial dynastic line was left without a successor after Emperor Henry II's death in 1024, on 4 September an assembly of the imperial princes appointed the 34-year-old Conrad king (Rex romanorum). He was the great-great grandson of Otto the Great.

Conrad II adopted many aspects of his Ottonian predecessor Henry II regarding the role and organisation of the Church as well as general rulership practices, which in turn had been associated with Charlemagne. While the emperor was not anti-monastic, he immediately abandoned the favouritism that had been shown to men of the Church under Henry II. In Italy, he initially relied on the bishops (mostly of German origin) to maintain imperial power. Beginning with his second Italian expedition in 1036, he changed his strategy and managed to win the support of the valvassores (lesser nobles) and the military elite, who challenged the power of the bishops. His reign marked a high point of medieval imperial rule during a relatively peaceful period for the empire. Upon the death of the childless King Rudolph III of Burgundy in 1032, Conrad claimed dominion over the Kingdom of Burgundy, conquered it with German and Italian troops, and incorporated it into the empire. The three kingdoms (Germany, Italy and Burgundy) formed the basis of the empire as the "royal triad" (regna tria).

== Early life ==
=== Family background ===
Conrad's parents

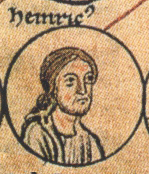
Father Henry of Speyer, c.1237

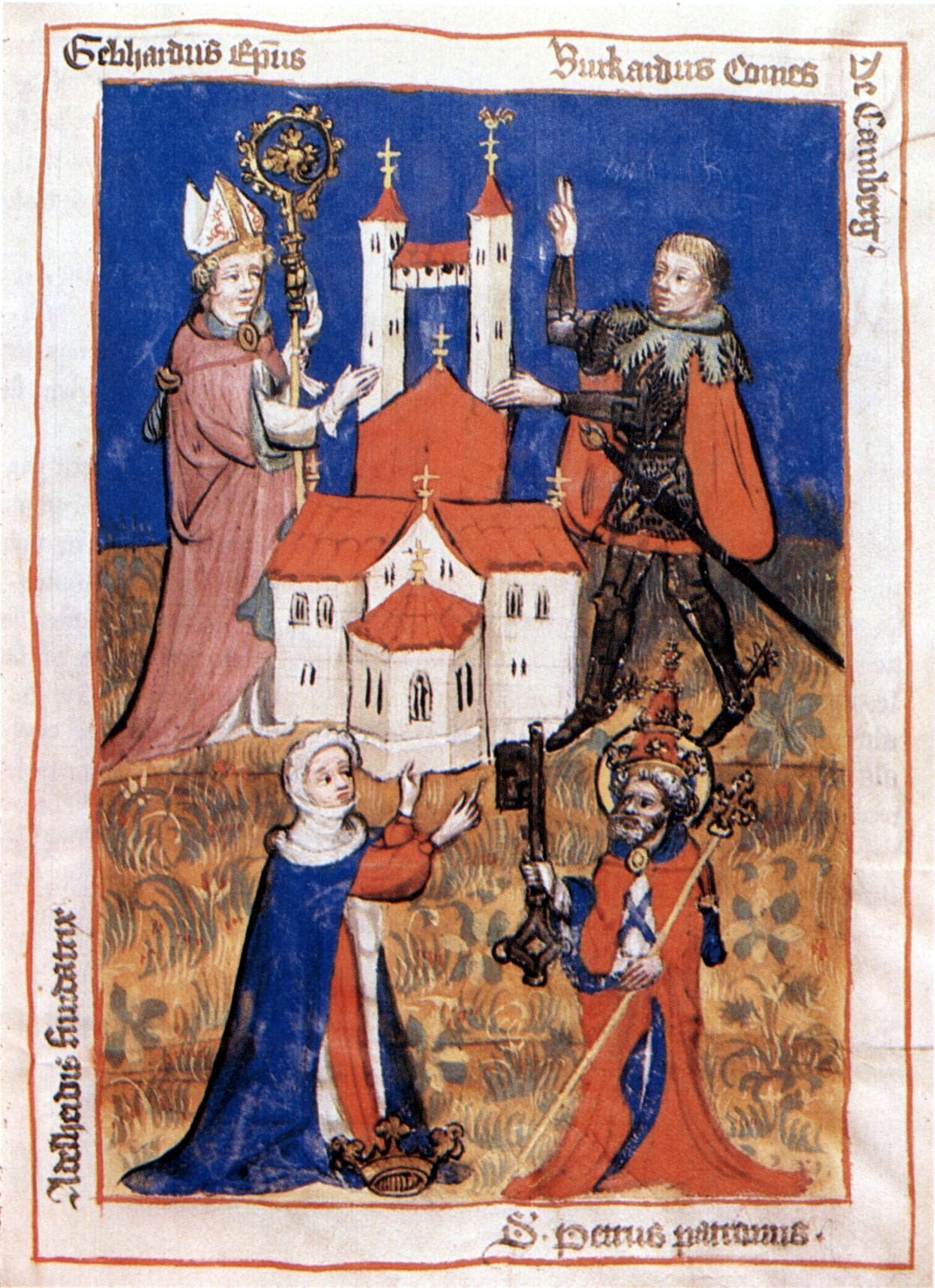
Mother Adelaide of Metz (b,l), 1037 foundation of the Öhringen Convent of canons

The origins of the Salian dynasty can be traced back to Count Werner V of Worms, a Frankish nobleman from the Duchy of Franconia to the east of the Rhine. His son, Conrad the Red, succeeded him as Count in 941. King Otto I (the future Holy Roman Emperor) elevated him to Duke of Lorraine in 944. He subsequently married Liutgarde, one of Otto's daughters, in 947 and rose to become one of the king's closest allies. The relationship, however, deteriorated, when Otto refused to honour a peace treaty that Conrad, as Otto's representative, had negotiated with Berengar II of Italy. Conrad also resented the growing influence of Otto's brother Henry I of Bavaria, whom he regarded as a threat to his position. In 953 Conrad joined the king's son Liudolf in rebellion against Otto. The rebellion was crushed and Conrad was stripped of his ducal title. Conrad and Otto eventually reconciled. Conrad fought alongside Otto and fell in the decisive Battle of Lechfeld in 955 that put an end to the Hungarian invasions into Europe. Conrad was succeeded as Count of Worms in 956 by his son Otto of Worms, who was also the grandson of Otto I. In between 965 and 970, Otto of Worms' first son and Conrad II's father Henry of Speyer was born, of whom only very little is known. He died at the age of 20 between 985 and 990. Conrad II's mother was Adelaide of Metz. After Henry's death, Adelaide married a Frankish nobleman and the relationship with Conrad declined.

In 978 Emperor Otto II appointed his nephew Otto of Worms as Duke of Carinthia. He succeeded the rebellious Duke Henry I of Carinthia, who had been deposed after the War of the Three Henries. Upon receiving the ducal title, however, Otto lost his countship at Worms, which was given to Bishop Hildebald, emperor Otto II's imperial chancellor. When Otto II died suddenly in 983, his infant son Otto III succeeded him, with his mother Theophanu serving as regent. Theophanu sought to reconcile the imperial house with Henry I, restoring him as Duke of Carinthia in 985, with Otto of Worms allowed to regain his ancestral position as Count of Worms. However, Otto was allowed to style himself "Duke of Worms" and his original territory was expanded according to his rank. Otto of Worms loyally served the new Emperor and received the March of Verona in 955, as the actual Duchy of Carinthia was given to Henry IV of Bavaria. In 996, Otto III invested Otto of Worms' son Bruno as Pope Gregory V. When Emperor Otto III died in 1002, both Otto of Worms, Conrad's grandfather, and Henry IV became eligible for Kingship of Germany. In a compromise, Otto withdrew and in return received the Duchy of Carinthia from the newly elected king Henry IV, who ruled as Henry II of Germany. As a result, Otto of Worms renounced his fiefs at Worms to Bishop Burchard of Worms, a long-time political rival.

After the early death of his uncle Conrad I, Duke of Carinthia, Conrad's infant son, Conrad II, Duke of Carinthia the Younger, was named Count of Worms by Emperor Henry II while the Duchy of Carinthia passed to Adalbero of Eppenstein due to Conrad the Younger's infancy. Conrad the Younger was taken care of by his cousin Conrad II, Holy Roman Emperor the Elder.

=== Adulthood ===
In 1016 Conrad married the twice-widowed duchess Gisela of Swabia, daughter of Duke Herman II of Swabia who, in 1002, had unsuccessfully claimed the German throne upon Emperor Otto III's death, and had lost the election to Emperor Henry II. Gisela had first been married to Count Bruno I of Brunswick the same year. Following Bruno's death around 1010, Gisela married Ernest I of the House of Babenberg. Through this marriage, Ernest I inherited the Duchy of Swabia upon the death of Gisela's brother Duke Herman III of Swabia in 1012. The marriage produced two sons: Ernest II and Herman. After the death of Ernest I in 1015, Emperor Henry II named Ernest II as Duke of Swabia. As Gisela's new husband, Conrad hoped to serve as regent for his minor stepson in the administration of the duchy, seeing it as an opportunity to increase his own rank and subsequently make a claim for his own duchy. Emperor Henry II blocked this attempt by placing the guardianship of Ernest II, and regency over Swabia, in the hands of Archbishop Poppo of Trier in 1016. This action further strained the already rough relationship between the imperial House of Otto and the Salian family.

Conrad II's hopes to obtain his own duchy failed, but the marriage to Gisela brought him wealth. Her mother, Gerberga of Burgundy, was the daughter of reigning Burgundian king Conrad and granddaughter of the late Frankish king Louis IV. Gisela also claimed descent from Charlemagne through both her mother and father. The marriage was opposed by many because of the familial relationship shared by Gisela and Conrad. Both were descendants of King Henry I – Conrad in the fifth generation and Gisela in the fourth. According to canon law, marriage was forbidden among relatives from the first to the seventh generation. Though Conrad's marriage differed little from the usual practice of the time, strict canonists frowned upon the marriage and Emperor Henry II relied on this violation of canon law when he forced Conrad into temporary exile. During this exile, Gisela bore Conrad a son, the future emperor Henry III, on 28 October 1017. Conrad and Emperor Henry II eventually reconciled and he returned to Germany.

== Reign as king ==
=== Royal election ===
The 1024 German royal election was an imperial election held on 4 September 1024 at Kamba to select the successor to the German throne. The election resulted in the victory of Conrad the Elder, marking the historic transition of power from the Ottonian dynasty to the Salian dynasty.

Emperor Henry II died childless in 1024, bringing an end to the Ottonian dynasty that had ruled Germany since 919. Without a clear successor to the German throne, Henry's widow Cunigunde of Luxembourg ruled as regent while the German dukes gathered to elect a new king. Cunigunde was assisted by her brothers Bishop Dietrich I of Metz and Duke Henry V of Bavaria. Archbishop Aribo of Mainz, the primate of Germany, also assisted Cunigunde.

On 4 September 1024, the German princes gathered at Kamba, a historical name for an area on the east banks of the Rhine opposite the modern German town of Oppenheim. Now the location of Kamba is marked with a small equestrian statue of Conrad II. The chronicler and Conrad's chaplain, Wipo of Burgundy, attended the meeting and documented the event. Archbishop Aribo presided over the assembly. Conrad presented himself as a candidate for election, as did his younger cousin Conrad. Both were descendants of Emperor Otto I by their common grandfather Otto of Worms, son of Liutgarde, one of Otto's daughters. Although further members of the Ottonian dynasty existed, none were seriously considered eligible. The Duchy of Saxony adopted a neutral strategy while the Duchy of Lorraine favoured the younger Conrad. A majority of the assembled princes favoured the elder Conrad, as the father of a seven-year-old son implied a more stable dynastic future for the kingdom. As president of the assembly, Archbishop Aribo cast the first vote and supported the elder Conrad. He was joined by the other clerics in support of him. The secular dukes then cast their votes for the elder Conrad as well. Archbishop Pilgrim of Cologne, Duke Gothelo I of Lower Lorraine and Duke Frederick II of Upper Lorraine did not support him.

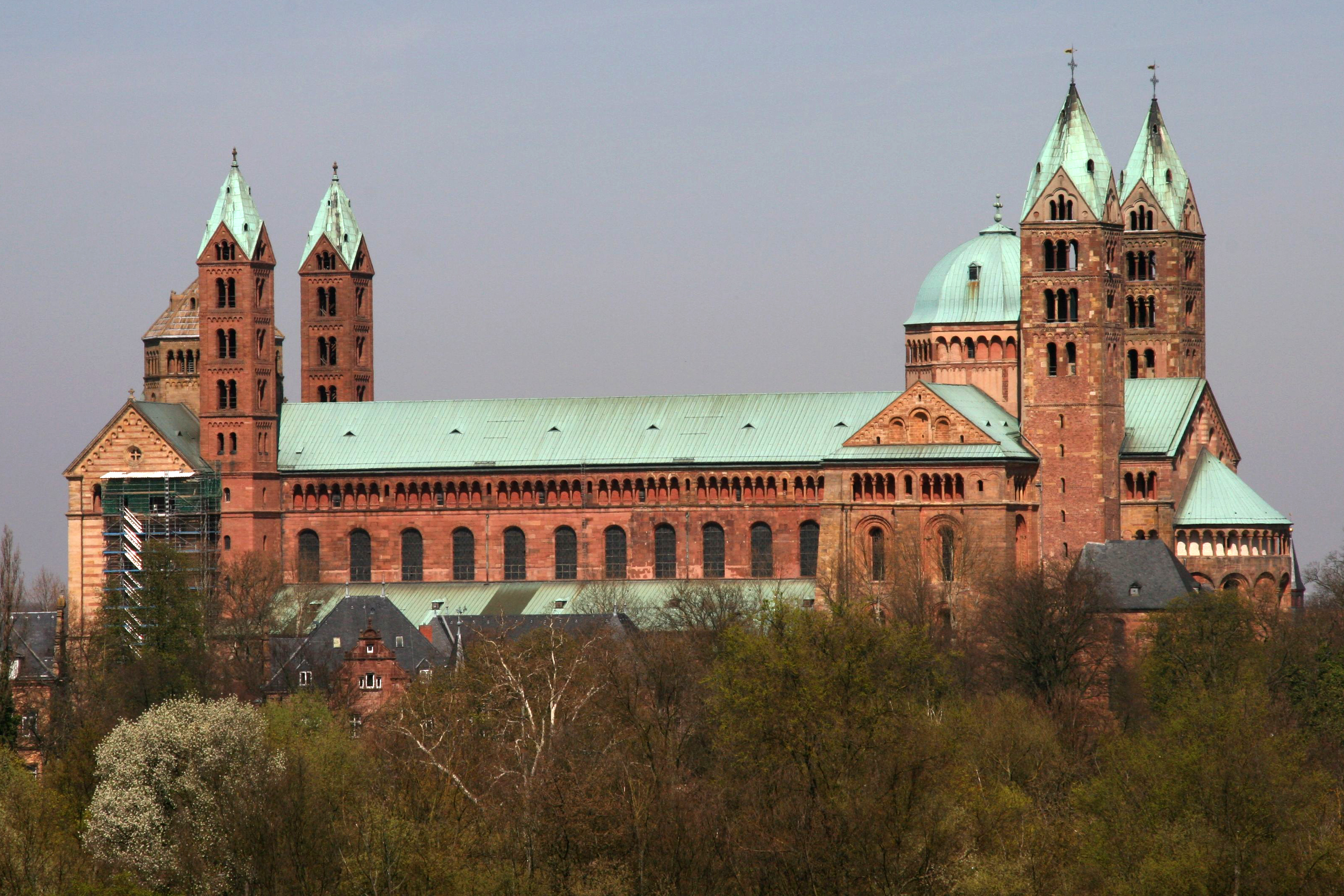
Speyer Cathedral, consecrated in 1061

Conrad was crowned king of Germany by Archbishop Aribo in Mainz Cathedral on 8 September 1024 at the age of 34. To mark his election, Conrad commissioned the construction of Speyer Cathedral, near his ancestral home of Worms. Construction began in 1030. Archbishop Aribo, as archbishop of Mainz, was already the chancellor of Germany. Conrad wanted to reward the archbishop for his electoral support, so he made Aribo chancellor of Italy as well, making Aribo the second most powerful man in the Holy Roman Empire as the imperial chancellor.

Aribo refused to crown Conrad's wife Gisela as queen as their marriage violated canon law. Conrad refused to accept Archbishop Aribo's position. Archbishop Pilgrim of Cologne saw the situation as an opportunity to restore his relationship with the king, after refusing to support Conrad's election, and he crowned Gisela queen on 21 September 1024. The political reorientation of Pilgrim also weakened the opposition towards the new king.

=== Early reign ===
Conrad inherited a kingdom troubled by problems. The dukes of Saxony and Lorraine and his cousin Conrad of Carinthia opposed his rule. In order to strengthen his position, Conrad and Gisela embarked on a royal tour. At Augsburg Conrad received the support of Bishop Bruno and at Strasbourg he acquired the support of Bishop Werner. Both men were brothers of former emperor Henry II and Conrad appointed them to high office at his court. After visiting Cologne Conrad stopped at Aachen, where he, as a successor of the empire's founder Charlemagne, announced that he would continue the tradition of claiming East Francia. The princes of the Duchy of Lorraine rejected his claim, though. Conrad then moved north to Saxony, visiting abbesses Adelaide I of Quedlinburg and Sophia I of Gandersheim, daughters of Emperor Otto II. They supported Conrad, which helped to rally the Saxon nobility behind him. During Christmas at Minden, the Saxon nobles, led by Duke Bernard II, officially recognized him as sovereign. He in turn had vowed to respect and honour the ancient Saxon customs and laws. Conrad and Gisela would remain in Saxony until March 1025, when they moved on to the Duchy of Swabia, celebrating Easter at Augsburg and then proceeded on to the Duchy of Bavaria, spending the feast of Pentecost at Regensburg. The royal couple finally visited Zürich, where after ten months they ended their tour. Conrad then entered Burgundy in order to renew the royal claim, that, in 1016, Emperor Henry II had forced the childless Burgundian King Rudolph III to name him as his heir.

Conrad needed to address the longstanding "Gandersheim Conflict", as he had assumed the German throne. The decade-old unsettled dispute on who controlled Gandersheim Abbey and its estates dated back to the reign of Emperor Otto III. Both the Archbishop of Mainz and the Bishop of Hildesheim claimed authority over the Abbey, including the right to invest and anoint the abbey's nuns. Though Otto III had once eased tensions among the warring parties by declaring that both bishops would be entitled to anoint the Abbess and her sisters, the conflict still lingered. Archbishop Aribo of Mainz, the new Primate of Germany, counted on Conrad, who was indebted to Aribo for his support during the royal election. In January 1027, the king summoned a synod at Frankfurt to end the dispute, but a conclusion could not be reached. He called another synod in September 1028, which also failed. Only a third synod in 1030 solved the conflict when Bishop Gotthard of Hildesheim renounced his claims in favour of Aribo.

During his royal tour at Augsburg, Conrad and his younger cousin Conrad the Younger engaged in an argument, that, although not entirely clear, was related to the younger Conrad's demands of yet-unpaid compensation that Conrad II had promised him for withdrawing from the 1024 election. The lack of conflict between them after September 1027 suggests that they reconciled by then.

=== Unrest in Italy ===
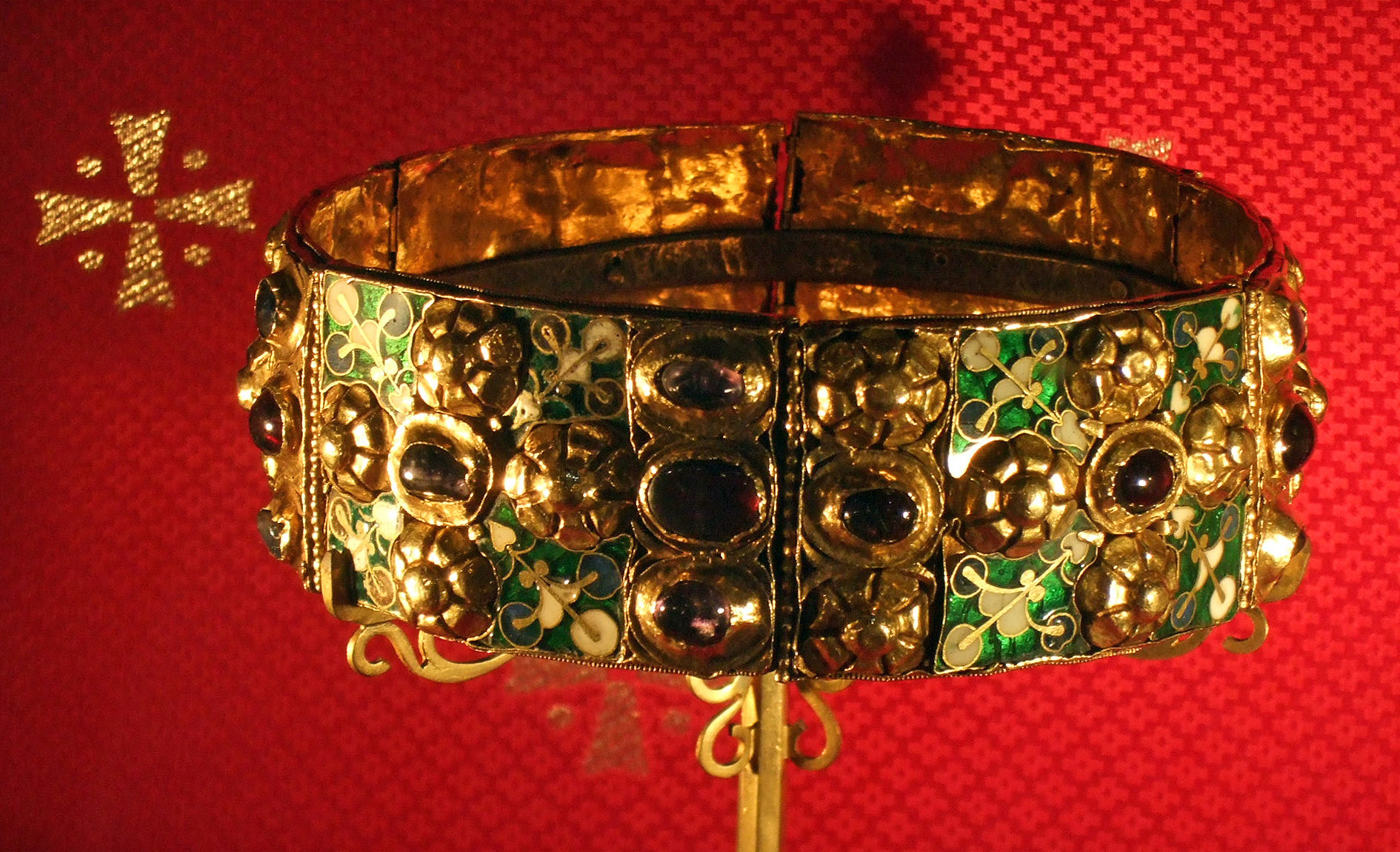
Following his expedition into Italy in early 1026, Conrad II was crowned with the Iron Crown of Lombardy as the King of the Lombards.

In Bavaria, Conrad came into contact with members of the Italian ruling elite for the first time. In June 1025, bishops from Northern Italy, led by Archbishop Aribert of Milan, crossed the Alps in order to pay homage to Conrad. In exchange for certain administrative privileges, Aribert agreed to crown Conrad King. However, the situation in Italy had become increasingly unstable after the death of Henry II. Amidst occasional riots, many Italian aristocrats demanded the secession of the Kingdom of Italy from the Holy Roman Empire. The local aristocrats and merchants increasingly considered the idea of Frankish ultramontan protection against Saracen and Byzantine threats to be obsolete. The Italian throne was now viewed as vacant and not Conrad's as a matter of right. The Lombard cities wanted to elect a king from the ranks of their own magnates, and when this motion failed, they tried to invite a prince from Aquitaine or other French realms. They offered the Italian crown to the Capetian king Robert II of France and his son Hugh Magnus. After the offer was rejected, they approached Duke William V of Aquitaine, who, initially intrigued by the offer, rejected it as well.

When the news of Henry's death spread, the citizens of Pavia revolted and destroyed the local imperial palace of the Ostrogothic king Theodoric the Great, built during the 5th century. Though Pavia was no longer the seat of imperial administration in Italy since the Ottonian dynasty, the palace had been perceived as a symbol of imperial authority in Italy and its mere presence within the city walls had been deemed intolerable. Pavia had—thanks to its strategic location on the trade routes from Italy to Burgundy and France—become an important commercial centre. The local merchants and aristocrats demanded the greatest possible autonomy from imperial control. Schutz notes that Pavia disliked the financial burden they had to bear whenever the monarchs came to the citadel. The bishops protested the separatist movement though, as they fared better under imperial protection than under local princes.

In the wake of the ecclesiastical mission, a party of noblemen from Pavia travelled north to meet Conrad and asked for severance from the Empire. The emissaries justified the actions of their fellow citizens by claiming that Pavia had always been loyal to the Italian king, as long as the king was alive and present, and that the revolt had taken place when the Italian throne was vacant. Conrad rejected the argument, that just as a ship remains devoted to its captain after his death, the Empire remains imperial property after the death of an emperor. The kingdom of Italy, according to Conrad, belonged to the empire as a matter of legal right. In his Constitutio de feudis ("Edict on the Benefices of the Italian Kingdom") of 1038 he would determine his regulations of the feudal contracts in Italy. Conrad also declared that the Ostrogothic palace was property of the Empire and therefore the king had the right to punish those responsible for its destruction. The Pavian embassy returned to Italy in opposition to Salian rule.

In February 1026, Conrad assembled a large army of armoured knights for an expedition into Italy, including troops commanded by both Archbishop Aribo of Mainz and Archbishop Pilgrim of Cologne. Conrad's army moved south and a contingent besieged Pavia and blocked all trade in the area, as he continued his campaign. By March 1026, Conrad arrived in Milan and was crowned with the Iron Crown of the Lombards by Archbishop Aribert of Milan as King of the Lombards. From Milan, Conrad travelled to Vercelli, where he celebrated Easter with the aged Bishop Leo of Vercelli, who had been a chief advisor to the late Emperor Otto III. When Leo died a few days later, Archbishop Aribert became the chief supporter of the Salian dynasty in Italy. With Conrad's assistance, Aribert rose to the highest-ranking religious office in Italy and oversaw the expansion of the Basilica of Sant'Ambrogio in Milan. In June 1026, Conrad led his army to Ravenna, but quartering his soldiers among the Ravennese population caused tensions in the city. Conrad then marched north to mitigate the risk the summer heat might pose to his army. In autumn Conrad left his summer camp in the Po Valley and marched to the Burgundian border. Conrad then celebrated Christmas at Ivrea. By the end of winter, the Italian aristocrats voluntarily ended their opposition to Conrad's reign. Pavia, however, remained in revolt until early 1027 when Abbot Odilo of Cluny brokered a peace deal between the city and Conrad.

== Reign as emperor ==
=== Imperial coronation ===
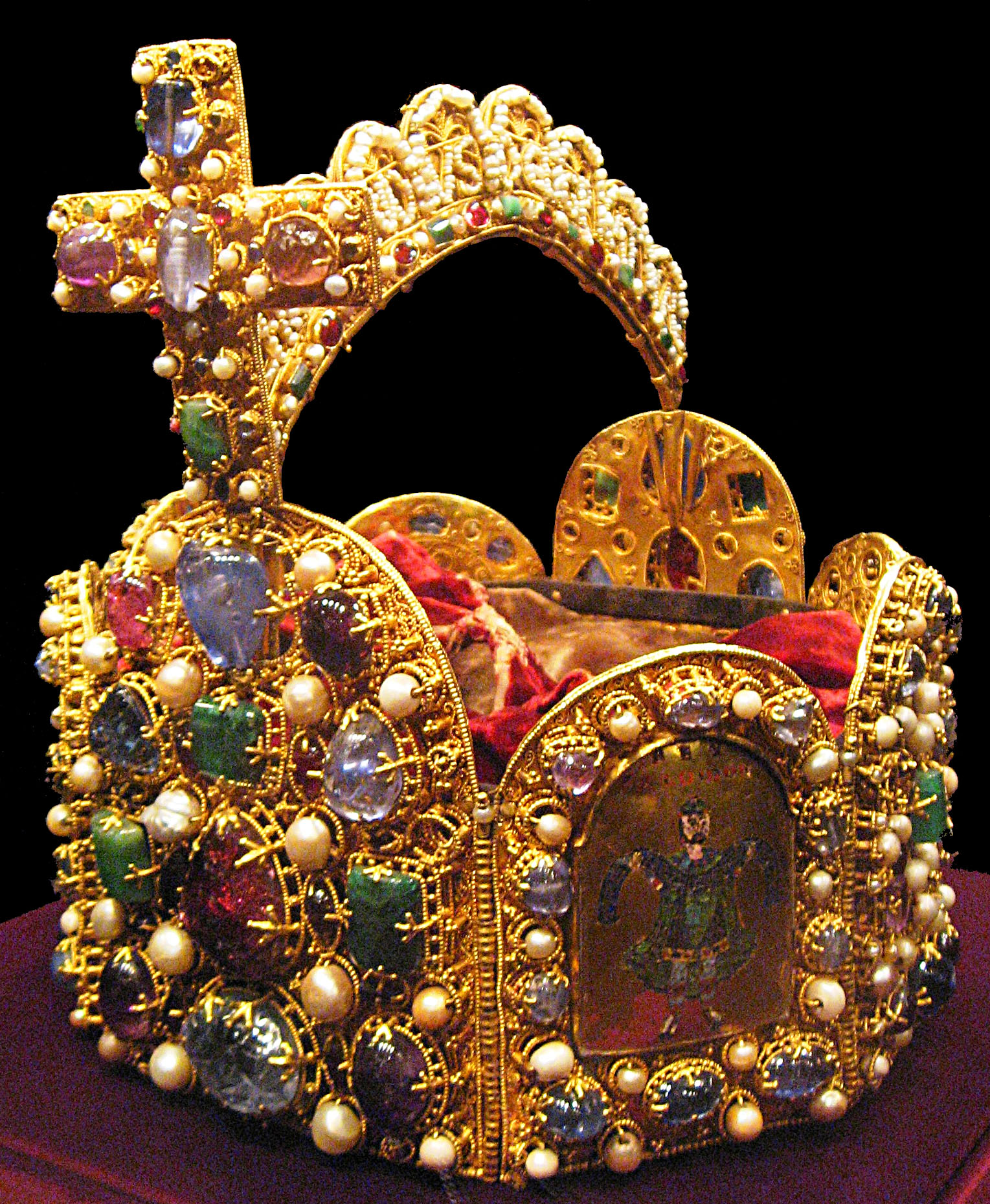
The Imperial Crown of the Holy Roman Empire. Conrad was crowned as Emperor on 26 March 1027, by Pope John XIX.

On 26 March 1027, Pope John XIX crowned Conrad and his wife Gisela as emperor and empress, respectively, in Old Saint Peter's Basilica in Rome. The event lasted seven days and was attended by Conrad's son and heir Henry; Cnut the Great, King of England, Denmark and Norway; Rudolph III of Burgundy and around 70 senior clerics, including the Archbishops of Cologne, Mainz, Trier, Magdeburg, Salzburg, Milan and Ravenna. Rudolph of Burgundy's attendance suggested surprisingly good relations between Burgundy and the Holy Roman Empire. During the festivities, a power struggle between the archbishops of Milan and Ravenna ensued and was settled in favour of Milan. Subsequently, Conrad left Rome and toured south to receive homage from the Southern Italian principalities of Capua and Salerno and the Duchy of Benevento.

After his coronation, Conrad issued decrees reorganising the monasteries and dioceses of Italy, with the explicit objective of bringing the Patriarchate of Venice under imperial control (see the Schism of the Three Chapters). On 6 April 1027, at a synod held in the Lateran Basilica with Pope John XIX, the emperor addressed the matter by declaring the Patriarchate of Aquileia superior to the Patriarchate of Grado, an ally of the Byzantine Empire. The Aquileian Poppo had been a loyal supporter of Emperor Henry II, who had appointed him patriarch in 1020. Conrad's action placed the patriarchate at Grado under Poppo's authority, securing Poppo's loyalty by making him the Emperor's top official in northern Italy. The synod also limited the political autonomy of Venice. In so doing, Conrad broke with the policies of his predecessors and revoked Venice's privileged trading status.

In May 1027 Conrad returned to Germany in order to attend the funeral of Duke Henry V of Bavaria at Regensburg. Conrad asserted his right to appoint the new Duke of Bavaria. He made the unprecedented decision of choosing his 10-year-old son Henry, ignoring several suitable candidates who held valid claims to the fief.

The young prince assumed Bavarian rule on 24 June 1027. Following Henry's appointment, Conrad held court at Regensburg and decreed that all imperial property in the duchy must be documented. This required the various counts and bishops to report all imperial property in their domains, castles and abbeys. Even the dowager empress Cunigunde of Luxembourg was required to report to Conrad, who even claimed that Cunegonde's wittum (money and property she had inherited from her deceased husband Emperor Henry II) belonged to him. These dubious claims to property and the excessive promotion of imperial authority over ducal and clerical affairs throughout Bavaria caused, unsurprisingly, new tension between him and the German aristocracy.

=== Uprising in Swabia ===
In 1025, Duke Ernest II of Swabia, Conrad's stepson from his marriage to Gisela of Swabia, rebelled against his stepfather when he was elected king of Germany. By 1026, Conrad had defeated the resistance and Ernest submitted to his reign. Due to the intervention of his mother Gisela, Ernest was allowed to accompany Conrad on his expedition to Italy in 1026. During the expedition, the rebellion led by Conrad of Carinthia and Count Welf II of Swabia continued. Conrad had named Bishop Bruno of Augsburg regent of Germany while he marched south to Italy. When Bruno was defeated by the rebels, Conrad sent Ernest back to Germany in September 1026 to end the revolt. When Ernest returned, however, he joined the rebels.

In 1027 Conrad returned to Germany after his imperial coronation and held court at Augsburg, calling upon the rebels to surrender. Ernest, trusting in the number and fidelity of his vassals, rejected the peace offer and appealed to his Swabian counts to join him in the rebellion. According to Wipo of Burgundy, the counts refused, stating that while they had sworn loyalty to Ernest, they would not rebel against their Emperor. Without the support of the Swabian counts, Ernest, Conrad of Carinthia and Count Welf surrendered to Conrad at Worms on 9 September 1027, ending the rebellion. Conrad stripped Ernest of his ducal title and imprisoned him at Giebichenstein Castle in Saxony. Gisela supported Conrad against her son but did not want Ernest to be entirely humiliated. As a result of his mother's intervention, Conrad allowed Ernest to retain his title while imprisoned, with Gisela serving as regent over the duchy.

In 1028, after Conrad's son Henry was crowned in Aachen as King of Germany, Gisela again intervened on Ernest's behalf. Conrad pardoned Ernest and released him from prison in 1028, but Gisela retained regency over Swabia. Ernest served as duke in name only. On Easter 1030, Conrad offered to restore to Ernest his full powers as Duke of Swabia if he would crack down on the Emperor's enemies there. Ernest's refusal, especially against his friend Count Werner of Kyburg, resulted in his final downfall. Conrad stripped his stepson of his title, declared him a public enemy, and had him excommunicated. Even his mother Gisela did not come to his rescue. Within a few months, both Ernest and Werner, who had retreated to Falkenstein Castle, south of modern Schramberg in the Black Forest, were killed in a battle against a contingent of the Bishop of Constance. The fall of Ernest greatly weakened the sovereignty of Swabia. Conrad appointed Ernest's younger brother Herman as a new Swabian prince. As Herman was still a minor, the Bishop of Constance was assigned to be his regent. Eight years later in 1038, Herman died and Conrad installed his own son Henry as duke, securing imperial control over the duchy.

=== Conflict with Adalbero ===
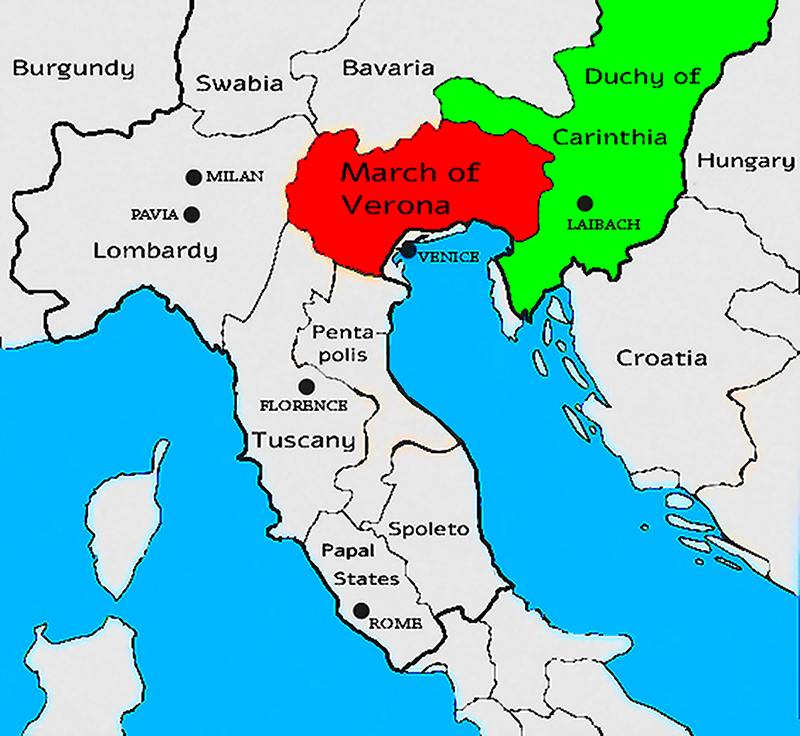
Emperor Conrad disapproved of Duke Adalbero's increasingly indiscreet and quasi-independent rule of his estates Carinthia and Verona, that compromised the stability at the crossroads of the empire

Conrad had to enforce his royal prerogatives in the Duchy of Carinthia and the Duchy of Swabia. Duke Adalbero of Carinthia had been appointed as duke in 1012 under Emperor Henry II and remained loyal to imperial authority, supporting Conrad's election as German king in 1024. At a synod in Frankfurt in September 1027, Conrad attempted to resolve the decades-long "Gandersheim Conflict". Adalbero accompanied the Emperor and acted as his sword-bearer during the proceeding, indicating Conrad's trust in him. From 1028 on, Adalbero governed his duchy as an independent state.

In particular, he attempted to conduct peaceful relations with King Stephen I of the Hungary. Under Emperor Henry II, who was the brother-in-law to Stephen, relations between the Empire and Hungary had been friendly. Upon Henry's death in 1024, Stephen I adopted a more aggressive policy, prompting border raids into the Empire from Hungary. The raids particularly affected Adalbero's domain of Carinthia, which shared a long, eastern border with Hungary.

Conrad summoned Adalbero to court at Bamberg on 18 May 1035, to answer an indictment of treason for his actions regarding Hungary. In the presence of the German dukes, Conrad demanded that Adalbero be stripped of all his titles and lands. The dukes demurred and demanded that Conrad's son Henry, Germany's co-king and Conrad's designated successor, join the assembly before a decision was made. Henry refused to depose Adalbero, citing an earlier agreement with Adelbero to be his ally in negotiating a settlement between him and his father. Conrad resorted to exhortations, pleas and threats to convince Henry to support Adalbero's deposition. Henry's support was soon followed by that of the other dukes. Conrad then ordered Adalbero to be removed as Duke and sentenced him and his son to exile. After attacking Conrad's allies in Carinthia, Adalbero fled to his mother's estates in Ebersberg in the Duchy of Bavaria, where he remained until his death in 1039. The ducal seat of Carinthia remained unoccupied until 2 February 1036, when Conrad named his cousin Conrad the Younger as the new duke. With the appointment, the three southern German duchies of Swabia, Bavaria and Carinthia were all under the control of Emperor Conrad through his family members (his stepson Herman in Swabia, his son Henry in Bavaria, and his cousin Conrad in Carinthia).

Control of the southern duchies allowed Conrad to continue the process begun under the Ottonian dynasty, centralizing the Emperor's authority over the Empire at the expense of the regional dukes. Conrad broke with Ottonian tradition, however, in favouring a more strict means of controlling rebellious vassals. Whereas the Ottonians followed a policy of informal public submission and subsequent reconciliation, Conrad used treason trials to declare rebels as "public enemies" to legitimize his subsequent harsh treatment, as he had done with Ernest II of Swabia and Adalbero. The nobles saw the use of these treason trials not as mere power shifts in favour of the Emperor, but as a cruel breach of German tradition.

=== Policy towards the Church ===
Conrad continued the Ottonian dynasty's imperial church system—a policy of using the German Church as a vehicle for imperial control. Beginning in the 950s, the Ottonians had favoured Church officials over secular nobles for appointment to the Empire's most important offices. Claiming "divine right" to rule the Empire, the Ottonians increasingly viewed themselves as protectors of the church and thus demanded loyalty from the Church officials. In return, the various bishoprics and abbeys of the Empire were granted extensive landholdings and secular authority, providing immunity from the jurisdiction of the secular nobles. As such, the Church officials reported exclusively to the Emperor, acting as his personal vassals. As the Emperor's vassals, the Church officials were subject to the provision of two services: the servitium regis (royal service) and servitium militum (military service). Under royal service, the bishops and abbots were required to provide hospitality and accommodations to the Emperor and his court when he arrived. It also required the Church officials to act as quasi-bureaucracy for the Empire. Under military service, the Church was required to supply soldiers for the Emperor's army or to act as diplomats at his direction. Conrad energetically continued this tradition.

In his biography of Conrad, the chronicler Wipo of Burgundy stated the promotion of the Church was of little value to the Emperor. Conrad and the other members of the Salian dynasty had little interest in the founding of new monasteries. Through their hundred-year dynasty, the Salians only founded one: Limburg Abbey which was converted from a fortress to a monastery in 1025. The Ottonians established at least eight in their hundred-year reign. Additionally, the Ottonians were active in the establishment of Church affairs, but Conrad was uninterested, only calling five synods during his reign and usually only to restore peace. Conrad's decisions on Church policy were often left to his wife Gisela of Swabia. When Archbishop Aribo of Mainz, Primate of Germany, died in 1031, Conrad considered both Abbot Bardo of Hersfeld Abbey and the renowned theologian Wazo of Liège, then serving as the dean of the cathedral chapter for the Bishop of Liege. Though Conrad favoured Wazo to lead the German Church as Archbishop and Primate, Gisela convinced him to appoint Bardo instead.

=== Relations with Poland ===
==== War with Mieszko Lambert ====
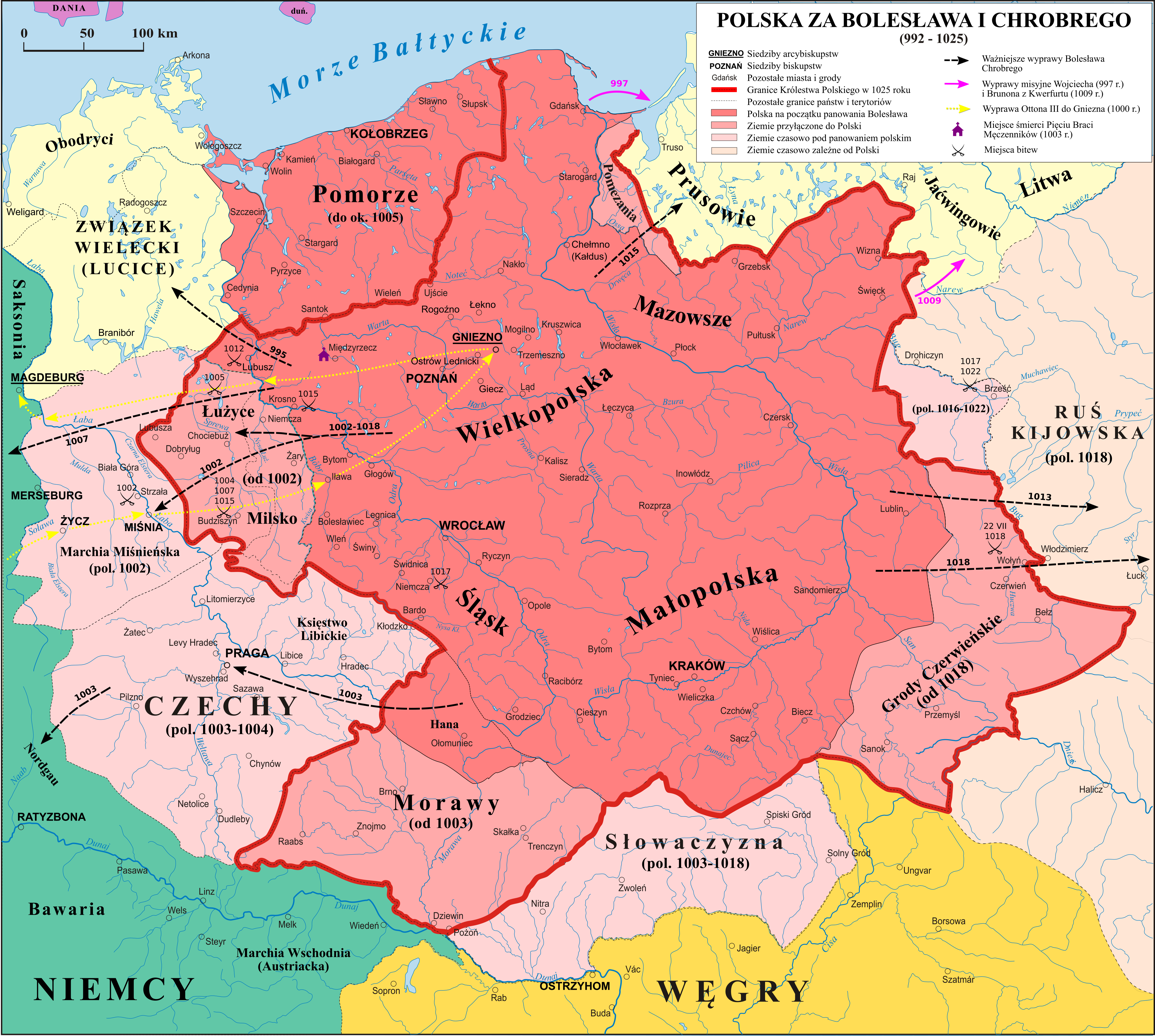
The Duchy of Poland at its greatest extent under Bolesław I and his son Mieszko II Lambert

Duke Bolesław I of Poland of the Piast dynasty repeatedly clashed with Emperor Henry II during the German–Polish Wars of 1002 to 1018. In January 1018, Henry II and Bolesław I signed the peace treaty of Bautzen, that settled the permanent coexistence of the Empire and Poland as Bolesław recognized Henry II as his nominal feudal lord. In return, Henry II generously invested Bolesław with territories on the Empire's eastern border. In order to reinforce his dynastic bonds with the German nobility, Bolesław, a widower, married Oda of Meissen, daughter of the Saxon margrave Eckard I of Meissen. The Empire and Poland enjoyed peace for the remainder of Henry's reign. However, Bolesław then seized the opportunity presented by Henry's death in 1024 and the subsequent interregnum to consolidate his own power, crowning himself King on Easter, 25 April 1025. Bolesław was thus the first Polish king, as his predecessors only held the ducal title of the political entity, called Civitas Schinesghe at the time, that had only a few decades ago revealed itself to the world and the Holy See in Rome. Bolesław died within two months of his coronation, most likely due to an illness. His son, Mieszko II Lambert, succeeded him as King, crowned on Christmas, 1025. Upon assuming the Polish throne, Mieszko expelled his older half-brother Bezprym and his younger brother Otto Bolesławowic. Otto went west to seek Conrad II's protection.

Conrad considered the assumption of the title "king" by Mieszko an act of war and a disregard of his imperial authority, but had to address domestic issues before dealing with Mieszko. In 1026 Conrad II marched into Italy to consolidate imperial authority south of the Alps and to claim the imperial crown from the Pope. In his absence, Duke Ernest II of Swabia, Conrad the Younger and Duke Frederick II of Upper Lorraine rebelled against his authority.

The rebels sought the support of Mieszko, which the Polish king granted, promising to take military action against Conrad. Conrad returned to Germany in mid-1027, putting an end to the rebellion before Mieszko could deploy his forces. In preparation for his own invasion of Poland, Conrad developed a closer relationship with King Cnut of England and Denmark (whose kingdom lay beyond the Empire's northern border). Cnut accompanied Conrad at his imperial coronation in 1027, and Conrad granted Cnut authority over the March of Schleswig, the land bridge between Denmark and Germany.

Fearing the possibility of a joint German-Danish attack, in 1028 Mieszko took the initiative and invaded Lusatia in the eastern Empire and occupied the territories of the Lutician Federation, where West Slavic Polabian tribes had settled and represented the majority of the population since the 10th century after centuries of steady immigration. Slavs had long been the targets of imperial military campaigns, particularly for the punishment and subjugation of pagan tribes. Emperor Otto I's lieutenants, Herman Billung and Gero, harassed Slavic settlers beginning in the 940s. As part of the Slavic revolt of 983, the Lutici rebelled against the Empire. In the ensuing war (983–995), the Lutici succeeded in reclaiming their independence and gained control of the Billung March and Northern March from the Empire. Though Emperor Otto III allied with Duke Bolesław I of Poland to reintegrate them into the Empire, Otto III's death ended the friendly relationship between Poland and the Empire. Instead, Bolesław competed with Otto III's successor, Emperor Henry II, for dominion over the Lutici, causing Henry II to ally the Empire with the Lutici against Poland. Under the Peace of Bautzen in 1018, all three parties remained in uneasy peace, with Poland allowed to retain the Margraviate of Meissen. Of the eastern marches, the Empire only kept the March of Lusatia. Mieszko's 1028 invasion ended the peace. The Lutici sent ambassadors to seek Conrad's protection against Mieszko, which Conrad granted and renewed the German-Lutician alliance.

Conrad, seeking to relieve pressure on the Lutici, counter-invaded Poland in 1029 and besieged Bautzen in the Margraviate of Meissen. However, faced with a potential invasion by Hungary and the failure of the Lutici to provide their promised contingent of troops, Conrad retreated. In 1030, Poland secured an alliance with Hungary, with Stephen I invading Bavaria while Mieszko invaded Saxony. Conrad responded by allying with Yaroslav the Wise, Grand Prince of Kiev, who captured Red Ruthenia, on Poland's eastern border. In 1031, Conrad concluded a peace treaty with Hungary by ceding the lands between the rivers Lajta and Fischa to Hungarian control. Freed from the threat of Hungarian attack, the Emperor was able to focus his attention on Poland. Marching on Mieszko in autumn 1031, Conrad again besieged Bautzen. Mieszko was crushed by the Holy Roman and Kievan invaders and his exiled brother Bezprym's rebellion. He surrendered to Conrad in the fall of 1031. The Treaty of Merseburg provided that Mieszko return the Margraviate of Meissen and the March of Lusatia to the Empire.

==== Treaty of Merseburg ====
Soon after Mieszko had concluded peace with the Empire, he was deposed by Bezprym, who had been in exile in the Kievan Rus' since 1025. Bezprym, with Conrad's approval, had persuaded the Kievan Grand Prince Yaroslav I the Wise to invade Poland and install Bezprym as sovereign. Mieszko fled to Bohemia where he was imprisoned and castrated by Duke Oldřich in retribution for Mieszko's father Bolesław's blinding of Duke Boleslaus III, Oldřich's brother, thirty years earlier. Shortly after taking power, Bezprym sent the Polish regalia to Conrad, officially renouncing the title "king" in favour of the traditional title "duke" and accepting the overlordship of the Empire over Poland. The royal regalia were delivered by Mieszko II's wife, Richeza of Lotharingia.

Bezprym's reign, however, was short. His extreme cruelty caused his half-brother Otto Bolesławowic to conspire against him. Bezprym's own men murdered him in the spring of 1032, which created a power vacuum in Poland. Conrad responded by holding a diet at Merseburg in 1033 to address the situation. Conrad's wife, Empress Gisela of Swabia, interceded on Mieszko's behalf and requested he be freed from imprisonment in Bohemia and allowed to regain the Polish throne. Under the terms of the Treaty of Merseburg, Conrad divided Poland among Mieszko, Otto and Detric, another half-brother. Mieszko was allowed to retain the title of Duke and nominal authority over all of Poland. Now that the Empire had a strong central leader, the treaty significantly increased the Empire's influence over Poland.

The regulation was short-lived as in 1033 Otto was killed by one of his own men, and Mieszko II took over his domains. Shortly after, Mieszko expelled Detric and reunited the whole country. Though Mieszko regained his territory, he still was opposed by the nobility and his own subjects. Mieszko did not adopt Bezprym's renunciation of the Polish crown and continued to style himself as King. Mieszko II died soon after in 1034, and upon his death, a Pagan reaction in Poland erupted. Subsequently, his wife Richeza and son Casimir I fled to the Empire.

=== Relations with Eastern Europe ===
==== Bohemia ====
The Duchy of Bohemia was incorporated into the Holy Roman Empire in 1004 during the German–Polish Wars, that lasted from 1002 to 1018. Emperor Henry II installed Jaromír as Duke of Bohemia and guaranteed protection against Polish aggression. Jaromír ruled only a small territory, however, as Poland had occupied the traditional Czech territories of Moravia, Silesia, Lesser Poland and Lusatia. In 1012, Jaromír was deposed by his brother Oldřich, who assumed the Bohemian throne for himself. Following the resumption of hostilities between the Empire and Poland in 1028, Oldřich went on the offensive against Poland, reconquering Moravia by 1029, which helped to stabilize his duchy. The war ended in 1031 when the Polish king Mieszko II surrendered to Conrad. During the following civil war, Mieszko was forced to flee Poland for Bohemia, where Oldřich had him imprisoned and castrated in revenge for the torture Mieszko's father, Bolesław I of Poland, inflicted upon Duke Boleslaus III, Oldřich's brother, thirty years before.

Poland did not stabilize in the wake of Mieszko's exile, forcing Conrad to convene an assembly in July 1033 to issue the Treaty of Merseburg which restored Mieszko to the Polish throne. Conrad summoned Oldřich to appear at the assembly, but Oldřich refused. His absence raised the ire of the Emperor; Conrad, busy with securing his succession to the Burgundian throne, charged his son Duke Henry of Bavaria with punishing the recalcitrant Bohemian. At age 17, Henry's march on Bohemia was his first independent military command. The expedition was a complete success, as Henry deposed Oldřich and restored his brother Jaromír to the Bohemian throne. Oldřich's son Bretislaus I was appointed as Count of Moravia. Oldřich himself was imprisoned in Bavaria, but in 1034 was pardoned and allowed to return to Bohemia. Oldřich deposed and blinded Jaromír, reclaimed the Bohemian throne, and exiled his son Bretislaus. While the reason for the conflict between father and son has been lost, it is assumed Bretislaus had supported Jaromír over his father. However, Oldřich died suddenly on 9 November 1034, allowing Bretislaus to return from exile. Though Jaromír was offered the throne, he declined in favour of his nephew. Bretislaus was then confirmed as the new Duke of Bohemia by Conrad II.

==== Hungary ====
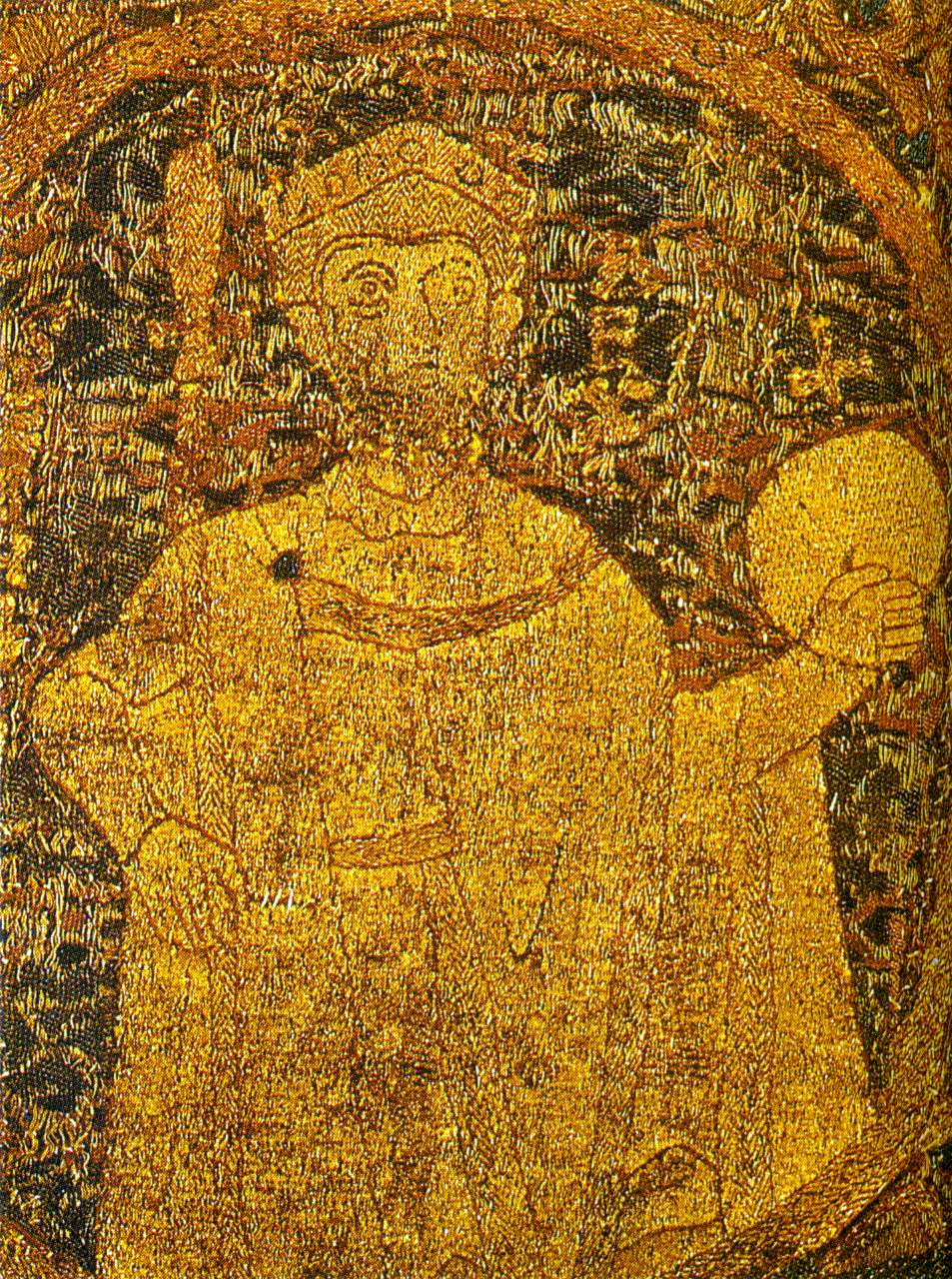
Stephen as depicted on the coronation pall

With emperor Otto III's approval, Stephen was crowned as the first Christian king of Hungary on Christmas Day, 1000. Otto III's successor, Emperor Henry II, was Stephen's brother-in-law by Stephen's marriage to Henry's sister Gisela, furthering the friendly relationship between the Empire and Hungary. Under Conrad II, however, relations quickly turned hostile as Conrad pursued a more aggressive policy regarding eastern Europe. Conrad II expelled the Venetian doge Otto Orseolo, the husband of Stephen's sister Grimelda of Hungary from Venice in 1026. Conrad also persuaded the Bavarians to accept his own infant son, Henry, as their duke in 1027, although Stephen's son, Emeric of Hungary, had a legitimate claim to the Duchy of Bavaria through his mother.

Emperor Conrad planned a marriage alliance with the Byzantine Empire and dispatched one of his advisors, Bishop Werner of Strasbourg, to Constantinople. The bishop presented himself as a pilgrim, but Stephen, who had been informed of his actual purpose, refused to let him enter the country in the autumn of 1027. Conrad's biographer Wipo of Burgundy recorded that the Bavarians incited skirmishes along the common Imperial-Hungarian border in 1029, causing a rapid deterioration in relations between the two countries. In 1030, open conflict erupted. Conrad launched an invasion into Hungary but was forced to retreat when the Hungarians successfully used scorched earth tactics. Conrad departed to address the problem with his stepson Ernest II, the deposed Duke of Swabia, leaving matters in Hungary to his son Henry. Henry settled the conflict by 1031 by bestowing titles to eastern Bavarian lands between the Lajta and Fischa rivers to the Hungarian nobility. Hungary and the Empire remained at peace from 1031 to Henry's own reign as Emperor in 1040.

=== Conquest of Burgundy ===
In 1016 King Rudolph III of Burgundy, ruler of the Kingdom of Burgundy, was left without a male heir, and so Henry II seized the opportunity and forced Rudolph to name him as successor. Henry II, the son of Rudolph's sister Gisela of Burgundy, was his nephew and closest living male relative. However, Henry predeceased Rudolph in 1024. Soon, Henry's successor Conrad II claimed to have acquired Henry's rights to the Burgundian succession, which Rudolph disputed. Count Odo II of Blois, who had strong family ties with Rudolph, also claimed the succession. Conrad II met Rudolph III in August 1027 near Basel to settle the dispute. Henry II's widowed wife, Empress Cunigunde of Luxembourg, mediated between the two parties. An agreement was reached that allowed Conrad II to succeed to the Burgundian throne upon Rudolph's death under the same conditions as Henry II. In return, Rudolph was allowed to retain independent rule over his kingdom.

Rudolph died on 6 September 1032, while Conrad was on campaign against Duke Mieszko II of Poland. Upon Mieszko's surrender, Conrad marched his army to Burgundy during the winter of 1032/1033. Conrad's rival to the Burgundian throne, Count Odo II of Blois had already invaded the kingdom to secure his rule and controlled large sections of the kingdom's western territories. On 2 February 1033, Conrad arrived at Vaud, where he held an assembly at the Abbey of Payerne and was crowned King of Burgundy.

Initially, Conrad made little progress against Odo and had to withdraw to Zürich in March. In April 1033 he negotiated a treaty of alliance with Henry I of France, which was completed at the end of May in a personal interview at Deville on the Meuse. Both monarchs had Odo for an enemy, since he had supported the claims of Henry I's younger brother to the French crown. Conrad might therefore have been given a free hand by his ally to invade Odo's French fiefs. In two large-scale military summer campaigns in 1033 and 1034, Conrad defeated Odo. On 1 August 1034, Conrad officially incorporated Burgundy into the Holy Roman Empire at a ceremony held in the Cathedral of Geneva.

Though Burgundy had been brought under full imperial control, the kingdom was allowed a remarkable degree of autonomy. Conrad rarely intervened in its affairs following his coronation, returning only in 1038 to announce his son Henry as the kingdom's future ruler. Crucially, the conquest of Burgundy augmented the influence and dignity of the Emperor to the benefit of the Empire. With Burgundy secured, Conrad controlled the western Alpine passes into Italy and could easily block foreign invasions.

== Politics ==
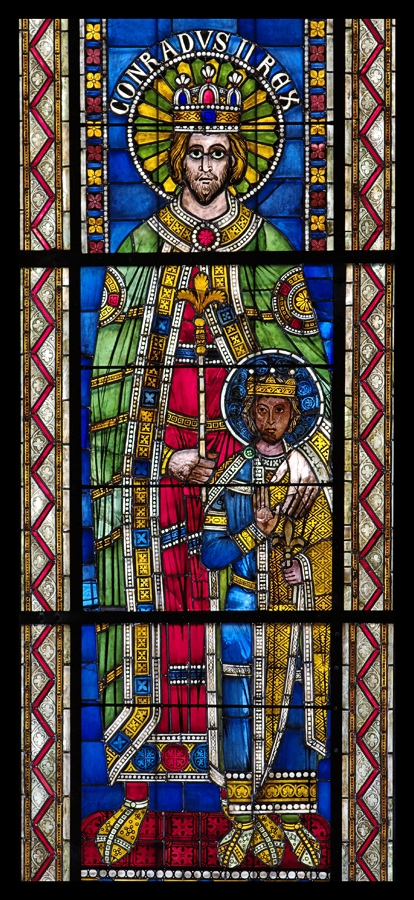
Conrad II, 12th-century stained glass window, Strasbourg Cathedral

Conrad formally confirmed the popular legal traditions of Saxony and issued new constitutions for Lombardy. In 1028 at Aachen, he had his son Henry elected and anointed king of Germany. Henry married Gunhilda of Denmark, daughter of King Cnut the Great of England, Denmark and Norway by Emma of Normandy. This was an arrangement that Conrad had made many years prior when he gave Canute parts of northern Germany to administer. Henry, who would later become Emperor Henry III, became his father's chief counselor.

When King Rudolph III of Burgundy died on 2 February 1032, Conrad claimed the kingship on the basis of an inheritance that Henry II had extorted from Rudolph in 1006, after Henry invaded Burgundy to enforce his claim in 1016. Despite some opposition, the Burgundian and Provençal nobles paid homage to Conrad in Zürich in 1034. This Kingdom of Burgundy, later known as the Kingdom of Arles from the 12th century, corresponded to most of the southeastern quarter of modern France and included western Switzerland, the Franche-Comté and Dauphiné. It did not include the smaller Duchy of Burgundy to the north, ruled by a cadet branch of the Capetian King of France. (Most of the former Kingdom of Burgundy/Arles was incorporated into France piecemeal over the next centuries, but "King of Burgundy" remained one of the Holy Roman Emperor's subsidiary titles until the dissolution of the Empire in 1806.)

Conrad upheld the rights of the valvassores (knights and burghers of the cities) of Italy against Archbishop Aribert of Milan and the local nobles. The nobles, as vassal lords, and the bishop had conspired to rescind rights from the burghers. Conrad restored order with skilful diplomacy and luck.

== Late life ==
=== Securing the imperial succession ===
On 14 January 1040, Conrad II's heir Henry issued a charter, in which he announced his official designation as Rex romanorum ("King of the Romans"), thus effectively elevating the traditional Frankish kingship to Imperial authority. This was the exclusive method for claiming the office of Holy Roman Emperor.

=== Second Italian expedition ===
In 1038, Prince Guaimar IV of Salerno requested that Conrad adjudicate in a dispute over Capua with its Prince Pandulf, whom Conrad had released from imprisonment in 1024, immediately after his coronation. Hearing that Michael IV the Paphlagonian of the Byzantine Empire had received the same request, Conrad went to Southern Italy, to Salerno and Aversa. He appointed Richer, from Germany, as abbot of Monte Cassino, as abbot Theobald was imprisoned by Pandulf. At Troia, he ordered Pandulf to restore stolen property to Monte Cassino. Pandulf sent his wife and son to ask for peace, offering 300 lb (140 kg) of gold and two of his children as hostages. The Emperor accepted Pandulf's offer, but the hostages escaped as Pandulf hid in his outlying castle of Sant'Agata de' Goti. Conrad besieged and conquered Capua and bestowed the place and the title of Prince on Guaimar. He also recognized Aversa as a county of Salerno under Rainulf Drengot, the Norman adventurer. Pandulf, meanwhile, fled to Constantinople. Conrad thus left the Mezzogiorno firmly in Guaimar's hands and loyal, for once, to the Holy Roman Empire.

=== Death ===
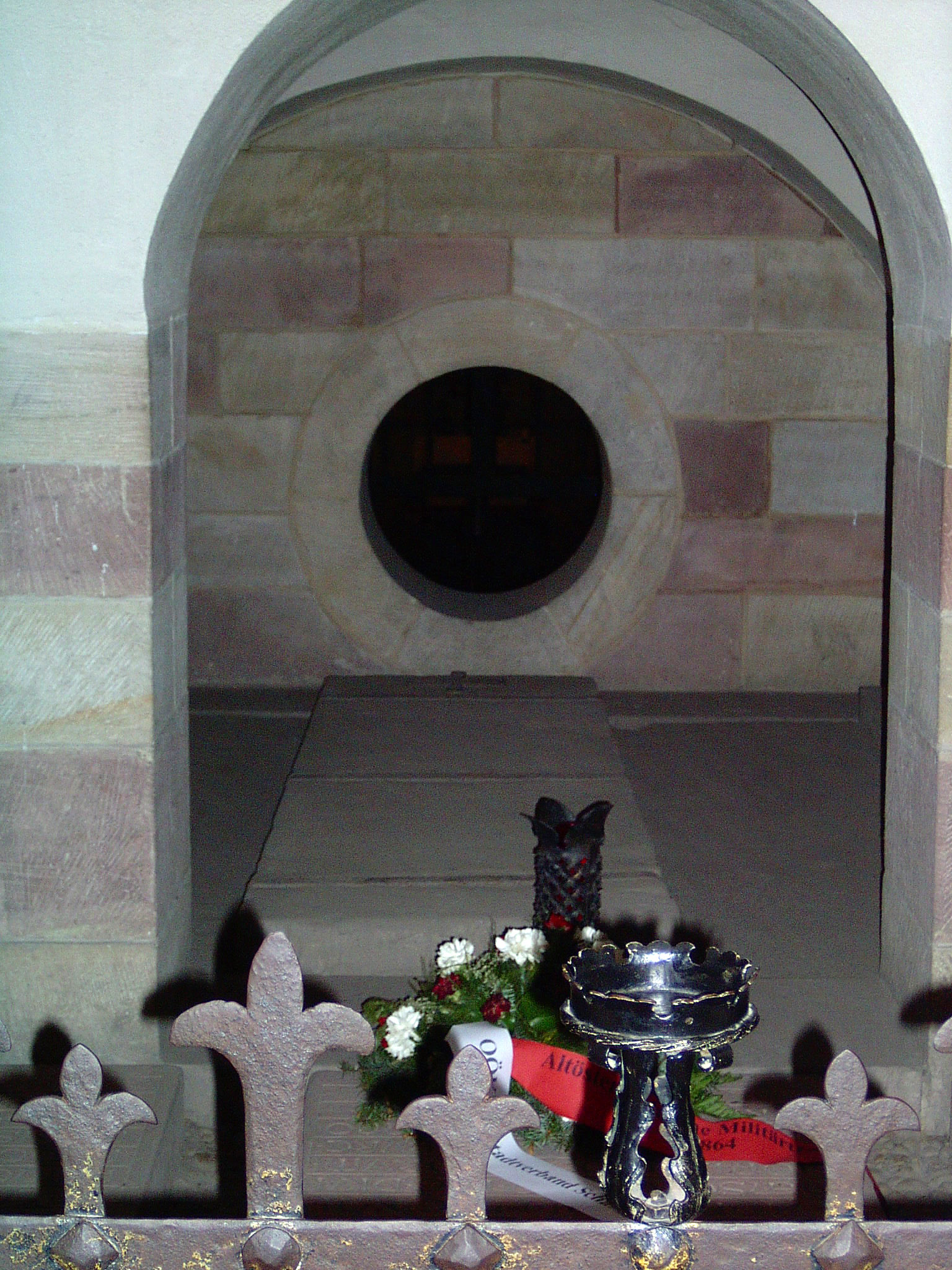
Conrad II's tomb in the Speyer Cathedral

On the return to Germany, a severe epidemic decimated the ranks of Conrad's troops; Conrad's daughter-in-law and stepson also died. Conrad himself returned home safely and held court on important occasions in Solothurn, Strasbourg and Goslar. His son Henry was invested with the duchies of Swabia and Carinthia.

A year later in 1039 Conrad fell ill and died on 4 June of gout in Utrecht. His heart and bowels are buried at the Cathedral of Saint Martin, Utrecht. His body was transferred to Speyer via Cologne, Mainz and Worms, where the funeral procession made several stops. His body is buried at Speyer Cathedral, a cathedral which he himself founded and contains the resting place of all Salian emperors. During a major excavation in 1900 his sarcophagus was relocated from his original resting place in front of the altar to the crypt, where it is still visible today.

A biography of Conrad II in chronicle form, Gesta Chuonradi II imperatoris, was written by his chaplain Wipo of Burgundy, and presented to Henry III in 1046, not long after he was crowned.

== Family and children ==
Conrad married Gisela of Swabia in 1016, the daughter of Duke Herman II of Swabia. They had three children:

- Henry III (1017–1056)
- Beatrix (c.1020–1036)
- Matilda (c. 1027–1034)

== Sources ==
- Bernhardt, John W. (2002). Itinerant Kingship & Monasteries in Early Medieval Germany, c. 936–1075. Cambridge University Press.
- Bogdan, Henry (2007). La Lorraine des ducs (in French). Perrin. ISBN 978-2-262-04275-2.
- Boshof, Egon (2008). Die Salier (in German) (5 ed.). Kohlhammer Verlag. ISBN 978-3-17-020183-5.
- Bury, John Bagnell, ed. (1922). The Cambridge Medieval History: Vol. III. Germany and the Western Empire.
- Butler, Alban; Cumming, John; Burns, Paul (1998). Butler's Lives of the Saints (New Full Edition): August. Burns & Oates. ISBN 0-86012-257-3.
- "Conrad II, Diplomata [Urkunden]". Monumenta Germaniae Historica (dMGH).
- Engel, Pál, ed. (2001). The Realm of St Stephen: A History of Medieval Hungary, 895–1526. I.B. Tauris Publishers. ISBN 978-1-86064-061-2.
- Györffy, György (1983). István király és műve [=King Stephen and his work] (in Hungarian). Gondolat Könyvkiadó. ISBN 963-9441-87-2.
- Halliday, Andrew (1826). Annals of the House of Hannover. London.at Google Books
- Heer, Friedrich (1968). The Holy Roman Empire. Translated by Sondheimer, Janet. Frederick A. Praeger.
- Herrmann, Joachim (1985). Die Slawen in Deutschland: Geschichte und Kultur der slawischen Stämme westlich von Oder und Neiße vom 6. bis 12. Jahrhundert. Berlin: Akademie-Verlag. ISBN 978-0-376-08338-8.
- Knefelkamp, Ulrich (2002). Das Mittelalter. UTB M (in German). Vol. 2105 (2 ed.). UTB. ISBN 3-8252-2105-9.
- Kristó, Gyula (2003). Háborúk és hadviselés az Árpádok korában [Wars and Tactics under the Árpáds] (in Hungarian). Szukits Könyvkiadó. ISBN 963-9441-87-2.
- Lenkey, Zoltán (2003). "Szent István [=Saint Stephen]". In Szentpéteri, József (ed.). Szent István és III. András [=Saint Stephen and Andrew III] (in Hungarian). Kossuth Kiadó. pp. 5–118. ISBN 963-09-4461-8.
- Lübke, Christian (2002). "Zwischen Polen und dem Reich. Elbslawen und Gentilreligion". In Borgolte, Michael (ed.). Polen und Deutschland vor 1000 Jahren. Die Berliner Tagung über den "Akt von Gnesen". Europa im Mittelalter. Abhandlungen und Beiträge zur historischen Komparatistik (in German). Vol. 5. Berlin: Akademie Verlag. pp. 91–110. ISBN 3-05-003749-0.
- Makk, Ferenc (2001). "On the Foreign Policy of Saint Stephen". In Zsoldos, Attila (ed.). Saint Stephen and His Country: A Newborn Kingdom in Central Europe – Hungary. Lucidus Kiadó. pp. 37–48. ISBN 963-86163-9-3.
- North, William L. (2001). "Conrad II". In Jeep, John M. (ed.). Medieval Germany: An Encyclopedia. Garland Publishing Inc.
- Previté-Orton, C.W. (1912). The Early History of the House of Savoy. Cambridge University Press.
- Schutz, Herbert (2010). The Medieval Empire in Central Europe: Dynastic Continuity in the Post-Carolingian Frankish Realm, 900–1300. Cambridge Scholars Publishing. ISBN 978-1-4438-2035-6.
- Weinfurter, Stefan (1999). The Salian Century: Main Currents in an Age of Transition. University of Pennsylvania Press. ISBN 0-8122-3508-8.
- Wolfram, Herwig (2006). Conrad II, 990–1039: Emperor of Three Kingdoms. The Pennsylvania State University Press. ISBN 0-271-02738-X.
- Wolfram, Herwig (2010). Conrad II, 990–1039: Emperor of Three Kingdoms. Penn State Press. ISBN 978-0-271-04818-5.

Conrad II, Holy Roman Emperor Salian dynasty Born: c 990 Died: 1039
Regnal titles
Vacant Title last held by Henry the Saint	King of Germany; 1024–1039 with Henry III (1028–1039)	Succeeded by Henry the Black
Vacant Title last held by Henry the Saint	Holy Roman Emperor; 1027–1039	Vacant Title next held by Henry the Black
Vacant Title last held by Henry the Saint	King of Italy; 1027–1039	Vacant Title next held by Henry the Black
Preceded by Rudolph the Pious	King of Burgundy; 1032–1039 with Henry the Black (1038–1039)	Vacant Title next held by Henry the Black
