= Luitpold I, Archbishop of Mainz =

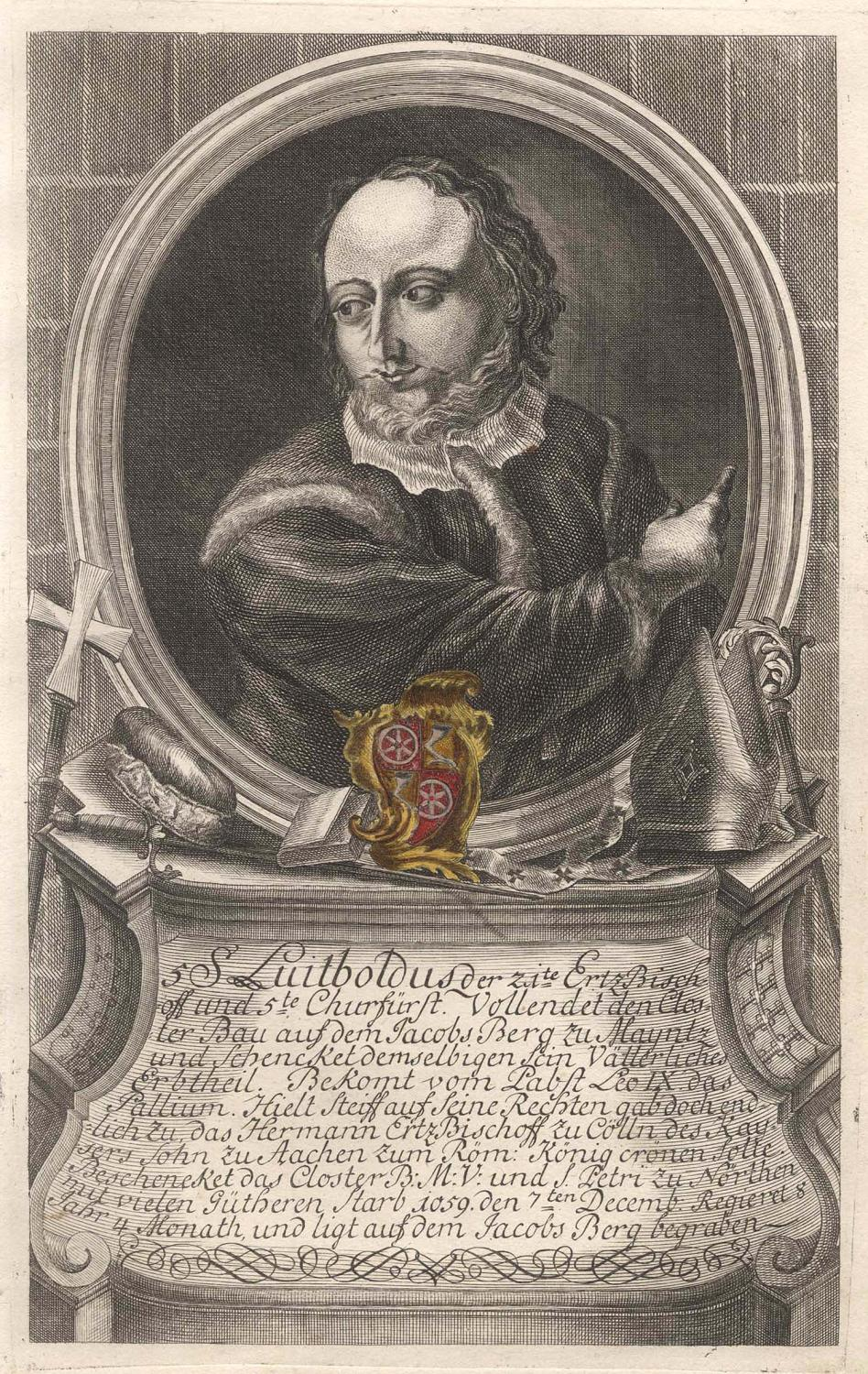
Luitpold, archbishop of Mainz

Luitpold (also known as Liutpold, Liupold, Luipold; died 7 December 1059) was archbishop of Mainz from 1051 to 1059.

Luitpold was born no later than 990. It is not known for sure what his background was; he owned property in the Bamberg area and may have been of Babenberg descent. After being educated in Fulda, he served as provost of Bamberg from 1021 until Henry III, Holy Roman Emperor made him archbishop of Mainz and Archchancellor of the Holy Roman Empire after the death of Bardo. In Mainz, Luitpold founded the Benedictine abbey St Jacob. When Henry IV, Holy Roman Emperor was crowned at Aachen by Herman II, the archbishop of Cologne, Luitpold protested, claiming the right to crown the emperor as an exclusive right for the archbishops of Mainz.

Luitpold died on 7 December 1059 and was buried in St Jacob Abbey.

== Sources ==
- Ebeling, Friedrich Wilhelm (1858). Die deutschen Bischöfe bis zum Ende des sechszehnten Jahrhunderts (in German). Wigand.
- Heinemeyer, Karl (1987). "Luitpold". Neue Deutsche Biographie (in German). Vol. 15. Berlin: Duncker & Humblot. pp. 506–507. (full text online).
- Hennes, Johann Heinrich (1879). Die Erzbischöfe von Mainz. Nebst der politischen und militärischen Geschichte der Stadt (in German). Diemer.
- McCarthy, Thomas John Henry (2014). Chronicles of the investiture contest : Frutolf of Michelsberg and his continuators : selected sources. Manchester : Manchester University Press. ISBN 978-0-7190-8470-6.
