= Bardo (bishop) =

- Archbishop of Mainz
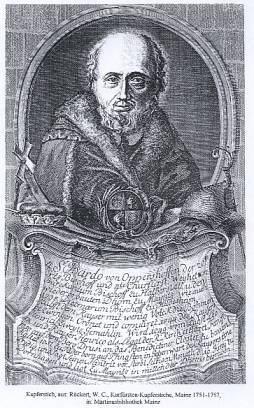
- Copperplate engraving by Rückert; 1751-1757
- Church: Catholic Church, Orthodox Church
- Diocese: Electorate of Mainz
- In office: 1031–1051

Personal details
- Born: c. 980
- Died: 10/11 June 1051

Bardo (Note: A version of "Bartholomew," variously spelled Barto, Bartho, Bardon, Bardeo, Bardus, Pardo, Partho, Barcho, Brado, Bartholomaeus.) (c. 980 – 10/11 June 1051) was the Archbishop of Mainz from 1031 until 1051, the Abbot of Werden from 1030 until 1031, and the Abbot of Hersfeld in 1031.

Bardo was born in Oppershofen in the Wetterau. He was educated and trained at the Abbey of Fulda, where he was selected to be the deacon and provost of Neuenberg in 1018. Towards the end of March in 1029 the Emperor Conrad visited Fulda, who appointed him in the following year the Abbot of Werden. He was said to have taken special attention to the obedience of the monks and quality of their service, and he established a hospitality and care service for those injured in war. In early in 1031 Bardo was transferred to become the abbot of Hersfeld, and by May 30 was again transferred to become the Archbishop of Mainz following the death of Aribo.

As archbishop, Bardo is said to have spent much of his time in the company of the Salian Emperors. He completed the Mainz Cathedral in 1037. In 1041 he accompanied King Henry the Black on campaign against Bohemia. He consecrated the churches and chapels in the vacant sees of Germany, and he presided over the Synod of Mainz in 1049 in the presence of Henry which denounced simony and priest marriage. Bardo and Henry met again in May 1051 in Paderborn. On the return to Mainz he fell ill and died at modern Oberdorla, and was buried in Mainz Cathedral. He is venerated as a saint in Mainz, feastday June 10.

Bardo is venerated as a saint in the Roman Catholic Church and Eastern Orthodox Church.

Preceded by Aribo	Archbishop of Mainz; 1031–1051	Succeeded by Leopold I
Preceded by Heidenreich of Aldenburg	Abbot of Werden; 1030–1031	Succeeded by Gerold of Limburg
Preceded by Arnold	Abbot of Hersfeld; 1031	Succeeded by Rotho of Büren
