= Aribo (archbishop of Mainz) =

- Archbishop of Mainz
- Church: Catholic Church
- Diocese: Electorate of Mainz
- In office: 1021–1031

Personal details
- Died: 1031

Aribo (died 1031) was the Archbishop of Mainz from 1021 until his death. He was Primate of Germany during the succession of Conrad II.

Aribo disputed with the Diocese of Hildesheim the jurisdictional right over Gandersheim Abbey, but Pope Benedict VIII found in favour of Hildesheim, a ruling which Aribo further disputed and ignored, without however denying the pope's right to judge. Aribo also grieved the cathedral chapter of the Diocese of Worms after they elected and the new king appointed a bishop without his (Aribo's) approval in 1025. Aribo also disapproved of Conrad's marriage to Gisela on the basis of consanguinity, challenging its legality.

Aribo expanded the economy of Thuringia by minting coinage at Erfurt, the oldest market and trading centre in the province.

Aribo had consecrated Saint Gotthard as bishop of Hildesheim on December 2, 1022.

== Sources ==
- Reuter, Timothy. Germany in the Early Middle Ages 800–1056. New York: Longman, 1991.
- Bernhardt, John William. Itinerant Kingship and Royal Monasteries in Early Medieval Germany, c. 936–1075. Cambridge: Cambridge University Press, 1993.

Preceded by Erkanbald	Archbishop of Mainz; 1021–1031	Succeeded by Bardo
