= Egon Boshof =

German medievalist

- Born: 13 January 1937 (age 89); Stolberg, North Rhine-Westphalia, Germany
- Occupation: Historian

Egon Boshof (born 13 January 1937 in Stolberg) is a German historian. From 1979 to 2002, he held the chair for Medieval History at the University of Passau.

== Works ==
=== Books ===
- Erzbischof Agobard von Lyon. Leben und Werk (= Kölner Historische Abhandlungen. Bd. 17). Böhlau, Köln u. a. 1969, ISBN 3-412-02369-8 (Zugleich: Köln, Univ., Diss., 1969).
- mit Kurt Düwell und Hans Kloft: Grundlagen des Studiums der Geschichte. Eine Einführung. Böhlau, Köln u. a. 1973, ISBN 3-412-08183-3.
- Heinrich IV. Herrscher an einer Zeitenwende (= Persönlichkeit und Geschichte. Bd. 108/109). Muster-Schmidt, Göttingen u. a. 1979, ISBN 3-7881-0108-3 (2. überarbeitete Auflage. ebenda 1990).
- Die Regesten der Bischöfe von Passau (= Regesten zur bayerischen Geschichte. Bd. 1–3). Herausgegeben von der Kommission für Bayerische Landesgeschichte. Beck, München; Band 1: 731–1206.

1992, ISBN 3-406-37101-9; Band 2: 1206–1254. 1999, ISBN 3-406-37102-7; Band 3: 1254–1282. 2007, ISBN 978-3-406-37103-5.

- Königtum und Königsherrschaft im 10. und 11. Jahrhundert (= Enzyklopädie deutscher Geschichte. Bd. 27). Oldenbourg, München 1993, ISBN 3-486-55726-2 (2. Auflage. ebenda 1997; 3. aktualisierte und um einen Nachtrag erweiterte Auflage. ebenda 2010, ISBN 978-3-486-59237-5).
- Ludwig der Fromme (= Gestalten des Mittelalters und der Renaissance.). Primus Verlag, Darmstadt 1996, ISBN 3-89678-020-4.
- Mitautor der Edition: Welt- und Kulturgeschichte. Epochen, Fakten, Hintergründe in 20 Bänden. Mit dem Besten aus der ZEIT. = Die ZEIT-Welt- und Kulturgeschichte. Zeitverlag Bucerius u. a., Hamburg 2006, ISBN 3-411-17590-7, für das Kapitel Was ist Geschichte.
- Europa im 12. Jahrhundert. Auf dem Weg in die Moderne. Kohlhammer Verlag, Stuttgart 2007, ISBN 978-3-17-014548-1. (Rezension)
- Die Salier (= Kohlhammer-Urban-Taschenbücher. 387). 5. aktualisierte Auflage. Kohlhammer, Stuttgart 2008, ISBN 978-3-17-020183-5.

=== Editor ===
- Regesta pontificum Romanorum. Vol. 10: Germania pontificia sive repertorium privilegiorum et litterarum a Romanis pontificibus ante annum MCLXXXXVIII Germaniae ecclesiis monasteriis civitatibus singulisque personis concessorum, Provincia Treverensis. Pars 1: Archidioecesis Treverensis. Vandenhoeck & Ruprecht, Göttingen 1992, ISBN 3-525-36032-0.
- Geschichte der Stadt Passau. Pustet, Regensburg 1999, ISBN 3-7917-1656-5.
