= Karolus magnus et Leo papa =

9th-century Latin poem

First page of the poem in manuscript

The Karolus magnus et Leo papa (Classical Latin: [ˈkarɔlʊz ˈmaŋnʊs ɛt ˈlɛ.oː ˈpaːpa], Ecclesiastical Latin: [ˈkaːroluz ˈmaɲɲus ɛt ˈlɛːo ˈpaːpa]; lit. 'Charles the Great and Pope Leo'), sometimes called the Paderborn Epic or the Aachen Epic, is a Carolingian Latin epic poem of which only the third of four books is extant. It recounts the meeting of Charlemagne, king of the Franks, with Pope Leo III, in AD 799.

== Date, authorship, and title ==
Carl Erdmann first brought historians' attention to the Paderborn Epic in 1951, when he argued that it was written before June 800. The epic may have been written in 799, but probably in the decade after, certainly before Charlemagne's death in 814. Henry Mayr-Harting suggests that the court held at Aachen in 802 is the most plausible context of composition.

Janet Nelson says that "one of [Charlemagne's counsellors] surely wrote this poem," and it may have been written by his own biographer, Einhard. Francesco Stella has argued for the authorship of Modoin, whose debt to Virgil in his description of Aachen elsewhere equals that of the Paderborn poet. It was familiar to Ermold the Black, who may have used it for the hunt scene in the fourth book of his Carmina in honorem Hludovici, an epic poem in honour of Charlemagne's son Louis the Pious.

The first two as well as the final books do not survive. Helene Scheck argues that the original, complete poem "recounted Charlemagne's ascendancy" and that consequently "it would seem that the first two sections offer background on Charlemagne's rise and the poem would reach its culmination in the coronation of Charlemagne." Although it must have been more widely disseminated in Ermold's time, the only surviving copy is the single-book fragment preserved in a late ninth-century manuscript.

The conventional title, Karolus Magnus et Leo Papa, derives from the first modern edition by Ernst Dümmler in 1881. A more recent edition by F. Brunhölzl was published under the title De Karolo rege et Leone papa in 1966 and re-published in 1999. Given that the poem as it now exists is not a complete work, Dieter Schaller points out that giving the work any title that translates to "Charlemagne and Pope Leo" is rather inaccurate, as such a move over-emphasizes the importance of merely one of the many events in the larger work.

== Contents ==
The Paderborn Epic's hunt scene probably describes an actual hunt in the spring of 799, although it is "highly stylized". The importance of women in Charlemagne's court is highlighted by the order of his retinue: Queen Luitgard, followed by sons Charles and Pippin, and then the "brilliant order of girls" (puellarum… ordo coruscus) Rotrude, Bertha, Gisela, Ruodhaid, Theodrada, and Hiltrud. During the hunt, Charlemagne stops to take a nap and dreams that Leo has been attacked and his eyes and tongue cut out.

Historically, Leo was wounded severely during an attack on 25 April 799, but his eyes and tongue were saved by Charlemagne's missi dominici. The poet nevertheless mentions the mutilation five times and seven times describes a miraculous healing. The miracle was used to attest Leo's saintliness amidst accusations of adultery by his enemies. By August 799, Charlemagne's adviser Alcuin of York had burned a letter about Leo's adulteries, perhaps convinced of his innocence by the miraculous healing.

The meeting at Paderborn was probably the first time that an imperial coronation was discussed for Charlemagne, and it is no coincidence that its verse epic is "replete with imperial phraseology". The poet compares Charlemagne to Aeneas, forefather of the Romans, and calls him augustus and Europae venerandus apex, pater optimus ("revered pinnacle of Europe; best father"). The poet also likens Charlemagne's capital of Aachen to a "second Rome" and a "Rome-to-be".

The city of the poem is generally identified with Charlemagne's capital, although it is not explicit in the poem and the city might in fact be Paderborn itself, whose church was consecrated in 799. The poet alludes to the conversion of the Saxons and praises terror as a means to an end: "What the contrary mind and perverse soul refuse to do with persuasion / Let them leap to accomplish when compelled by fear" (Quod mens laeva vetat suadendo animusque sinister / Hoc saltim cupiant implere timore coacti).

== Bibliography ==
- Beumann, H; Brunhölzl, F.; Winkelmann, W., eds. (1966). Karolus Magnus et Leo Papa: Ein Paderborner Epos von Jahre 799. Paderborn, Germany: Bonifacius Druckerei.
- Bullough, D. A. (1970). "Europae Pater: Charlemagne and His Achievement in the Light of Recent Scholarship". The English Historical Review. 85 (334): 59–105. doi:10.1093/ehr/lxxxv.334.59. ISSN 0013-8266. JSTOR 563053.
- Dümmler, Ernst, ed. (1881). "Karolus Magnus et Leo papa". Poetae latini aevi Carolini (in Latin). Vol. 1. Berlin, Germany: Weidmannos. pp. 366–379.
- Garrison, Mary (1994). "The Emergence of Carolingian Latin Literature and the Court of Charlemagne (780–814)". In McKitterick, Rosamond (ed.). Carolingian Culture: Emulation and Innovation. Cambridge, UK: Cambridge University Press. pp. 111–40. ISBN 9780521405249.
- Godman, Peter (1985). Poetry of the Carolingian Renaissance. Norman, OK: University of Oklahoma Press. ISBN 9780585118260.
- Hentze, Wilhelm; von Padberg, Lutz; Schwind, Johannes; Stork, Hans-Walter; Brunhölzl, Franz, eds. (1999). De Karolo rege et Leone papa: der Bericht über die Zusammenkunft Karls des Grossen mit Papst Leo III. in Paderborn 799 in einem Epos für Karl den Kaiser. Paderborn: Bonifatius. ISBN 9783897100640.
- Mayr-Harting, Henry (1996). "Charlemagne, the Saxons, and the Imperial Coronation of 800". The English Historical Review. 111 (444): 1113–1133. doi:10.1093/ehr/cxi.444.1113. ISSN 0013-8266. JSTOR 575852.
- Mayr-Harting, Henry (2011). "Charlemagne's Religion". In Godman, Peter; Jarnut, Jörg; Johanek, Peter (eds.). Am Vorabend der Kaiserkrönung: Das Epos "Karolus Magnus et Leo papa" und der Papstbesuch in Paderborn 799. Walter de Gruyter. pp. 113–24. ISBN 9783050056272.
- McKitterick, Rosamond (2008). Charlemagne: The Formation of a European Identity. Cambridge, UK: Cambridge University Press. ISBN 9781139472852.
- Nelson, Janet L. (2005). "England and the Continent in the Ninth Century: IV, Bodies and Minds". Transactions of the Royal Historical Society. 15: 1–27. doi:10.1017/S0080440105000368. ISSN 0080-4401. JSTOR 3679360.
- Noble, Thomas F. X. (2009). Charlemagne and Louis the Pious: The Lives by Einhard, Notker, Ermoldus, Thegan, and the Astronomer. University Park, Pennsylvania: Penn State University Press. ISBN 9780271035734.
- Ratkowitsch, Christine (1997). Karolus Magnus – alter Aeneas, alter Martinus, alter Iustinus: zu Intention und Datierung des "Aachener Karlsepos". Vienna, Austria: Austrian Academy of Sciences. ISBN 9783700126355.
- Schaller, Dieter (1976). "Das Aachener Epos für Karls den Kaiser". Frühmittelalterliche Studien. 10: 136–68. doi:10.1515/9783110242096.134. S2CID 186745264.
- Schaller, Dieter (1977). "Interpretationsprobleme im Aachener Karlsepos". Rheinische Vierteljahrsblätter. 41: 160–79.
- Schaller, Dieter (1983). "De Karolo rege et Leone papa". In Karl Langosch; Kurt Ruh (eds.). Die Deutsche Literatur des Mittelalters: Verfasserlexikon Vol. 4. Berlin, Germany: Walter de Gruyter. ISBN 9783110088397.
- Scharer, Anton (2009). "Charlemagne's Daughters". In Stephen David Baxter; Catherine Karkov; Janet L. Nelson; David Pelteret (eds.). Early Medieval Studies in Memory of Patrick Wormald. Farnham, UK: Ashgate Publishing. pp. 269–82. ISBN 9780754663317.
- Scheck, Helene (2012). "Nuns on Parade: Memorializing Women in Karolus Magnus et Leo Papa". In M. Cotter-Lynch; B. Herzog (eds.). Reading Memory and Identity in the Texts of Medieval European Holy Women. Springer. pp. 13–38. ISBN 9781137064837.
- Stella, Francesco (2011). "Autore e attribuzioni del 'Karolus Magnus et Leo Papa'". In Godman, Peter; Jarnut, Jörg; Johanek, Peter (eds.). Am Vorabend der Kaiserkrönung: Das Epos "Karolus Magnus et Leo papa" und der Papstbesuch in Paderborn 799. Walter de Gruyter. pp. 19–33. ISBN 9783050056272.
- Zwierlein, O. (1973). "Karolus Magnus – alter Aeneas?". In A. Önnerfors; J. Rathofer; F. Wagner (eds.). Literatur und Sprache im Europaische Mittelalter: Festschrift für Karl Langosch. Darmstadt, Germany: Wiss. Buchges. pp. 44–52. ISBN 9783534063925.
