= Ruodhaid =

Ruodhaid is a feminine given name of Germanic origin. Persons with the name include:

- Ruodhaid (concubine of Charles Martel)
- Ruodhaid (daughter of Pepin the Short)
- Ruodhaid (daughter of Charlemagne)

Attested spellings include:

- Chrothaida
- Chrothais
- Hrodohaidis
- Hrodohagdis
- Hrodoagdis
- Hrodhaid
- Hrothagdis
- Hruodhaid
- Rhodhaid
- Rhodhaidis
- Rothaid
- Rothaidh
- Rothaidis
- Rotheda
- Ruadhaid
- Ruadheid
- Ruodhaidis
- Ruodheid
- Ruotheidis
- Ruothet
- Rutheidis
- Rutheit
- Rutheiz
