= Ruodhaid (daughter of Charlemagne) =

Frankish princess (died after 800)

Ruodhaid (Note: Her name is spelled Rothaidh in Latin by Theodulf (which Peter Godman regularizes to Ruadhaid in his translation). In the Paderborn Epic, it is Rhodhaid(is). Other modern spellings include Rothaid, Hruodhaid, and Ruodheid.) (died after 800) was a daughter of Charlemagne, king of the Franks.

Einhard, in his Life of Charlemagne, mentions her after the daughters of Charlemagne's wife Fastrada. He calls her mother "a concubine, whose name for the moment escapes me". In the poem "On the Court", however, Theodulf of Orléans names her before the daughters of Fastrada (but still after the daughters of Charlemagne's earlier wife Hildegard). In the poem, he lists the daughters and the gifts they bring their father at a banquet celebrating victory over the Avars in 795. Ruodhaid brings apples. She is also listed after the daughters of Hildegard and before those of Fastrada in the anonymous Paderborn Epic, composed around 800. The poet depicts her and her sister Bertha as the leaders of the women in Charlemagne's household. Joining her father on a hunting trip, the "beautiful maiden" Ruodhaid rides a "proud horse" into the woods to drive the deer.

Different theories about Ruodhaid's mother have been proposed, including that she was the nameless concubine mentioned by Einhard as the mother of Pepin the Hunchback. This woman, named Himiltrude, is elsewhere referred to as a wife in 770. The historian Michael Tangl argued that Sigrada, a maidservant freed by Charlemagne on 7 January 777, was probably one of the king's concubines and the likely mother of Ruodhaid. The historian Alessandro Barbero concludes from Einhard that Ruodhaid was born during Charlemagne's marriage to Fastrada (783–794), making her Charlemagne's only acknowledged child of born of infidelity. Karl Ferdinand Werner argues that, as the section of the Paderborn Epic describing Charlemagne's family is strictly chronological, Ruodhaid must have been born before Fastrada's daughters and after those of Hildegard (the youngest was born in 781). He concludes that she was most likely the product of a liaison that occurred between the death of Hildegard and the marriage to Fastrada. This puts Ruodhaid's birth in 784.

The mother of Charlemagne's grandson Richbod is unknown, but was one of the following women: Ruodhaid, Hiltrude (Fastrada's younger daughter) or Gisela (Hildegard's youngest daughter).

Ruodhaid died after 800, probably after 814.

== Bibliography ==
- Barbero, Alessandro (2004) [2000]. Charlemagne: Father of a Continent. Translated by Allan Cameron. University of California Press.
- Becher, Matthias (2005) [1999]. Charlemagne. Translated by David S. Bachrach. Yale University Press.
- Förstemann, Ernst Wilhelm (1900). Altdeutsches Namenbuch. Vol. 1. P. Hanstein's Verlag.
- Fried, Johannes (2016) [2013]. Charlemagne. Translated by Peter Lewis. Harvard University Press.
- Godman, Peter (1985). Poetry of the Carolingian Renaissance. University of Oklahoma Press.
- Guizard-Duchamp, Fabrice (2007). "Louis le Pieux roi-chasseur: gestes et politique chez les Carolingiens". Revue belge de Philologie et d'Histoire. 85 (3–4): 521–538.
- Hägermann, Dieter (2011) [2000]. Carlo Magno: Il signore dell'Occidente. Translated by Giuseppe Albertoni. Arnoldo Mondadori Editore.
- Nelson, Janet L. (1998) [1993]. "Women at the Court of Charlemagne: A Case of Monstrous Regiment?". In John Carmi Parsons (ed.). Medieval Queenship. St Martin's Press. pp. 43–61.
- Nelson, Janet L. (2019). King and Emperor: A New Life of Charlemagne. Penguin.
- Scharer, Anton (2009). "Charlemagne's Daughters". In Stephen Baxter; Catherine Karkov; Janet L. Nelson; David Pelteret (eds.). Early Medieval Studies in Memory of Patrick Wormald. Routledge. pp. 269–282.
- Turner, Samuel Epes, ed. (1898). Life of Charlemagne by Eginhard. Harper.
- Werner, Karl Ferdinand (1967). "Die Nachkommen Karls des Großen bis um das Jahr 1000". In Wolfgang Braunfels; Percy Ernst Schramm (eds.). Karl der Große: Lebenswerk und Nachleben. Vol. 4. Düsseldorf. pp. 403–482.
