= Gersuinda =

Concubine of Charlemagne

Continental Europe during Gersuinda's lifetime (with her native Saxony (Saxonia) indicated).

Gersuinda (also Gersvinda, Gervinda; died after 800) was a concubine of the emperor Charlemagne, with whom he was in a relationship after the death of his last legitimate wife, Luitgard (died June 4, 800). According to Charlemagne's contemporary biographer, Einhard, Gersuinda was a Saxon, a people whom Charlemagne subdued over a thirty year period.

== Position at court ==
Gersuinda was one of four concubines of Charlemagne in the period after Luitgard's death, the others being Regina, Adallinda and Madelgard. Luitgard was praised lavishly after her death, but Gersuinda and the other concubines were apparently less popular among the clerical circles that surrounded Charlemagne, although (or perhaps because) their influence was significant. Ecclesiastics like Wetti of Reichenau (who supposedly had a vision of Charlemagne being tormented in the afterlife for his sexual activities) were disturbed by Charlemagne's 'undiminished and extramarital sexual energy' at this period.

As such, Gersuinda was part of a considerable female nexus that existed in close and intimate proximity to the emperor, which also included sisters, daughters and granddaughters, and which played important roles in the life of the court.

== Children ==
Gersuinda was the mother of Charlemagne's daughter, Adaltrude. Charlemagne was known to be fond of his daughters and reluctant for them to marry and/or leave his court, and Adaltrude's fate, like that of many of Charlemagne's children, is unknown, although many are known to have gone into the church. It is probable that she received a formal education, as Einhard stresses that Charlemagne's sons and daughters were educated in the liberal arts, and the women were expected to learn to spin and weave and 'acquire every womanly accomplishment, rather than fritter away their time in sheer idleness'.

== Later life and death ==
Charlemagne left a detailed will in which he provided for his legitimate offspring and his sons' children, and which offers an important source 'for Charlemagne's own attempts to order his family and his Empire in the last years of his life' and studying the interaction between his successor Louis the Pious and the women of the court. Einhard claims that Charlemagne intended to revise his will in order to ensure that his children by his concubines (such as Adaltrude) would be provided for, but that he never did so subsequently. However, an anonymous ex-courtier of Louis, known as the Astronomer (writing in the 840s), implies that Charlemagne's illegitimate children were also beneficiaries. Einhard makes no mention of any provision for his concubines.

The details of Gersuinda's subsequent life and date of death are unknown.
