= Ruothild (daughter of Charlemagne) =

Frankish princess and abbess (died 852)

Fragment of the silk with which Ruothild wrapped Saint Burgundofara's body

Notice of Ruothild's death, from a contemporary manuscript

Ruothild (died 24 March 852) was a Carolingian princess and the abbess of Faremoutiers. She was a daughter of Charlemagne and his concubine Madelgard, who is the first of the concubines listed by Einhard in his Life of Charlemagne.

Ruothild is generally thought to have been born after the death of Charlemagne's last wife, Liutgard, in 800, although it has been suggested that she may be the unnamed daughter mentioned in a poem of Theodulf praising Liutgard's relationship with her stepchildren.

As a daughter of Charlemagne, Ruothild probably received an education. Later legend relates that her father gave her a gilt silver reliquary containing a piece of the True Cross. As abbess, she oversaw the transfer of the relics of Burgundofara, the founder and namesake of Faremoutiers, to a new shrine. She had the body wrapped in a red Byzantine silk decorated with bare-breasted Amazons. Her choice of silk suggests familiarity with Orosius' Seven Books of History Against the Pagans, the standard text on the Amazons at the time.

During her abbacy, Ruothild's half-brother, the Emperor Louis the Pious (r. 814–840), granted the smaller convent at Gy-les-Nonains to Faremoutiers to shore up its economic position (and increase his own family's power). In October 840, the Emperor Lothar I confirmed the grant to his "beloved aunt Rothildis" at her request. By 842, as a result of the Carolingian civil war, Faremoutiers fell under the rule of Lothar's half-brother, Charles the Bald, and Ruothild requested his confirmation of the convent's properties, which he gave.

Ruothild's year of death is indicated by a note added in the margin of the manuscript Reg. lat. 141 next to the year 852 in an Easter table. The manuscript was created at Faremoutiers and the note is contemporary. It reads simply Domna ruothild abb[atiss]a obiit ("Lady Ruothild, abbess, died"). The necrology of Faremoutiers supplies the day of her death, 24 March, without indicating the year. Ruothild was succeeded as abbess by Bertrada, who was probably Lothar's daughter. She had been a nun at Faremoutiers since the 830s.

== Bibliography ==
- Airlie, Stuart (2020). Making and Unmaking the Carolingians, 751–888. Bloomsbury.
- Becher, Matthias (2005) [1999]. Charlemagne. Translated by David S. Bachrach. Yale University Press.
- Barbero, Alessandro (2004) [2000]. Charlemagne: Father of a Continent. Translated by Allan Cameron. University of California Press.
- Cabaniss, Allen (1972). Charlemagne. Twayne Publishers.
- Fried, Johannes (2016) [2013]. Charlemagne. Translated by Peter Lewis. Harvard University Press.
- Hochstetler, Donald (1992). A Conflict of Traditions: Women in Religion in the Early Middle Ages, 500–840. University Press of America.
- McKitterick, Rosamond (2008). Charlemagne: The Formation of a European Identity. Cambridge University Press.
- Minois, Georges (2014). Charlemagne. Perrin. doi:10.3917/perri.minoi.2014.01. ISBN 978-2-262-04423-7.
- Nelson, Janet L. (1998) [1993]. "Women at the Court of Charlemagne: A Case of Monstrous Regiment?". In John Carmi Parsons (ed.). Medieval Queenship. St Martin's Press. pp. 43–61.
- Nelson, Janet L. (2019). King and Emperor: A New Life of Charlemagne. Penguin.
- Piggin, Jean-Baptiste (2017). "Charlemagne's Daughter". Macro-Typography.
- Schulenburg, Jane Tibbetts (2008). "Women's Monasteries And Sacred Space: The Promotion ofSaints' Cults and Miracles". In Lisa M. Bitel; Felice Lifshitz (eds.). Gender and Christianity in Medieval Europe: New Perspectives. University of Pennsylvania Press. pp. 68–86.
- Screen, Elina (2004). "The Importance of the Emperor: Lothar I and the Frankish Civil War, 840–843". Early Medieval Europe. 12 (1): 25–51. doi:10.1111/j.0963-9462.2003.00120.x.
- Sot, Michel (2015). "Trois ou quatre concubines: une variante dans les manuscrits de la Vie de Charlemagne par Eginhard". In Laurent Jégou; Sylvie Joye; Thomas Lienhard; Jens Schneider (eds.). Splendor Reginae: Passions, genre et famille. Mélanges en l'honneur de Régine Le Jan. Haut Moyen Âge. Vol. 22. Brepols. pp. 119–125. doi:10.1484/m.hama-eb.5.103307. ISBN 978-2-503-55309-2.
- Stevenson, Jane (2005). Women Latin Poets: Language, Gender, and Authority, from Antiquity to the Eighteenth Century. Oxford University Press.
- Werner, Karl Ferdinand (1967). "Die Nachkommen Karls des Großen bis um das Jahr 1000". In Wolfgang Braunfels; Percy Ernst Schramm (eds.). Karl der Große: Lebenswerk und Nachleben. Vol. 4. Verlag L. Schwann. pp. 403–482.
