= Fastrada =

Queen of the Franks from 784 to 794

Queen consort of the Franks
- Tenure: 784–794
- Born: c. 765; Ingelheim
- Died: 10 August 794 (aged 28–29); Frankfurt
- Burial: St. Alban's Abbey, Mainz
- Spouse: Charlemagne (m. c. 783)
- Issue: Theodrada; Hiltrude
- Father: East Frankish Count Rudolph
- Mother: Aeda
- Religion: Catholic

Fastrada (c. 765 – 10 August 794) was queen consort of East Francia by marriage to Charlemagne, as his third (or, in some sources, fourth) wife.

== Life ==
Fastrada was born circa 765 at Ingelheim, the daughter of the powerful East Frankish Count Rudolph (also called Eadolf), and his wife, Aeda.

Fastrada became the third wife of Charlemagne, marrying him in October 783 at Worms, Germany, a few months after Queen Hildegard's death. A probable reason behind the marriage was to solidify a Frankish alliance east of the Rhine when Charles was still fighting the Saxons. Moreover, a Carolingian king needed a queen for the court and palace to function effectively.

Due to her influence Pepin the Hunchback, son of Charlemagne and Himiltrude, was publicly tonsured after an attempted rebellion against his father. Fastrada soon won a reputation for cruelty, although this is reported by chronicler Einhard in his Vita Karoli Magni, who had not arrived at Charlemagne's court while she was still alive. Einhard blamed the rebellion on Fastrada's influence, perhaps partly to avoid blame being placed on Charlemagne's policies. Contemporary sources suggest that she played an active role alongside her husband. A letter from 785 has survived in which Charlemagne asked Fastrada to come to the Eresburg with the children, although a letter only six years later he inquires about her health because he had not heard from her for a long time and tells her of a victory against the Avars.

In 793, Charlemagne introduced a coin type with Fastrada on it. It is the first known Carolingian coin with a queen named on it, a surprising change considering Charlemagne's tendency to remove any names but his own from coinage. Scholars suggest that Charlemagne was inspired to mint this coin after Offa of Mercia had earlier done so for his wife Cynetryth.

After Christmas 793, Charlemagne and Fastrada went from Wurzburg to Frankfurt (in present-day Germany), where she died on 10 August 794 during the Synod of Frankfurt. Charlemagne is said to have never returned to the place of her death out of mourning for her. He had her buried at St. Alban's Abbey, Mainz, before the abbey was finished, and had her silver spindle hung over the altar. Due to Archbishop Richulf's influence, she was not buried in the Basilique Saint-Denis, the burial site of almost all the Frankish and French monarchs, nor St. Arnulf's Abbey near Metz.

Her tomb was of white marble, adorned with gold and statues. After the destruction of St. Alban's Abbey in 1552, her tombstone was transferred to Mainz Cathedral, where it can be seen today in the wall of the southern nave. The inscription reads as follows:

Latin

Fastradana pia Caroli conjunx vocitata,
Cristo dilecta, jacet hoc sub marmore tecta.
Anno Septingesimo nonagesimo quarto,
Quem númerum metro claudere musa negat.
Rex pie quem gessit virgo licet hic cinerescit,
Spiritus heres sit patrie que tristia nescit.

Translation:
English

The pious wife of Charles, called Fastrada,
loved by Christ lies here covered with marble.
In the year seven hundred and ninety-four.
Which number to add to the meter resists.
Pious king, whom the maiden wore, grant, if she crumbles to ashes here too,
that their spirit be the heir of the fatherland that knows no tribulation.

== Children ==
- Theodrada (b. 784, d. unknown), abbess of Argenteuil
- Hiltrude (b. 787, d. unknown)

== Legend and popular culture ==
The Fastrada legend tells of a magic ring that Fastrada is said to have received from Charlemagne. This ring, the stone of which was a gift from a snake, bound Charlemagne to Fastrada in such a way that he did not want to release her corpse for burial even when it was already beginning to decompose. Eventually Archbishop Turpin of Reims took the ring and threw it in a lake near Aachen.

The Stephen Schwartz musical Pippin features a stylized Fastrada, portrayed by Leland Palmer in the original 1972 Broadway cast, by Chita Rivera in the 1981 television film, and by Charlotte d'Amboise in the 2013 Broadway revival. She is portrayed as fabulous but scheming, and prefers her son Lewis to her stepson Pippin.

Royal titles
Preceded by Hildegard	Queen of the Franks; 784–794	Succeeded by Luitgard
