= Friedelehe =

Medieval form of Germanic marriage

Friedelehe meaning "lover marriage" is a term for a postulated form of Germanic marriage said to have existed during the Early Middle Ages. The concept was introduced into mediaeval historiography in the 1920s by Herbert Meyer. There is some controversy as to whether such a marriage form, a quasi-marriage, existed but historians who have identified it agree that it was not accepted by the Church.

== Etymology ==
The term Friedelehe means approximately "lover marriage". The modern German word Friedel is derived from the Old High German friudil, which meant "lover", or "sweetheart"; this is in turn derived from frijōn "to love". The OHG friudil was parallel to the Old Norse fridl, frilla, modern Danish and Norwegian frille "lover".

Friedel is compounded with the word Ehe "marriage", from OHG ēha or ēa "marriage", which in turn harks back to the form ēwa, meaning (approximately) cosmic or divine "law". An OHG form friudilēha is itself apparently not attested, contributing to the controversy about the authenticity of the modern term.

== Defining characteristics of Friedelehe according to Meyer ==
According to Herbert Meyer, the characteristics of Friedelehe were:

- The husband did not become the legal guardian of the woman, in contrast to the Muntehe, or dowered marriage.
- The marriage was based on a consensual agreement between husband and wife, that is, both had the desire to marry.
- The woman had the same right as the man to ask for divorce.
- Friedelehe was usually contracted between couples from different social status.
- Friedelehe was not synonymous with polygyny, but enabled it.
- The children of a Friedelehe were not under the control of the father, but only that of the mother.
- Children of a Friedelehe initially enjoyed full inheritance rights; under the growing influence of the church their position was continuously weakened.
- A Friedelehe came into being solely by public conveyance of the bride to the groom's domicile and the wedding night consummation; the bride also received a Morgengabe.
- A Friedelehe was able to be converted into a Muntehe (dowered or guardianship marriage), if the husband subsequently conveyed bridewealth.

Perhaps the best known historic individual to have been born under a Friedelehe was Charlemagne who unified much of Europe in the Middle Ages. Most historians agree that he was born on 2 April 742 while his parents, Pepin the Short and Bertrada of Laon, were bound under a private contract, not considered to be a legal union; the couple did not marry until 744. According to Meyer, Friedelehe was declared illegitimate by the Church in the 9th Century. Nevertheless, vestiges of this form of marriage are said have persisted until modern times reflected in the form of the Morganatic marriage (also called left-hand marriage).

In addition to Friedelehe the aforementioned Muntehe, Kebsehe (concubinage), Raubehe (abduction) and Entführungsehe (elopement) are said to have existed in the Middle Ages.

== Criticism of Meyer's definition ==
According to research in the early years of the 21st century (among others that of Else Ebel, Karl Heidecker and Andrea Esmyol), indications have accumulated providing evidence to the effect that Friedelehe is a mere research artifact, a construct that arose from a faulty interpretation of the sources by Meyer. The following points of criticism have been raised:

- Ebel reviewed the Old Norse sources used by Meyer, and could not confirm Meyer's conclusions. She criticized him for taking some citations out of context, distorting their meaning.
- According to Esmyol, the textual citations used by Meyer all relate either to concubinage or to dowered marriages, and do not lead to any conclusions about the existence of a freer form of marriage such as Friedelehe.
- In addition, Meyer's most frequently used sources date from a time in which, even according to his own opinion, Friedelehe no longer existed.

That Meyer's theory was still able to prevail in this field of research for decades may be attributed to the specific context in which it developed. It was, on the one hand, a time in the 19th and early 20th century characterized by a search for historical models for freer choice in the amatory realm. In later years the Nazi regime ensured that Meyer's theory received attention, since it fit very well into the Nazi ideology emphasizing Germanic heritage and promoting a higher birthrate (cf. Lebensborn).

== Literature ==
- Meyer, Herbert. Friedelehe und Mutterrecht (Friedelehe and Maternal Rights). Weimar 1927 (In spite of the rather old publication date, this continues to be the central work for Friedelehe.)
- Peuckert, Will-Erich. Ehe; Weiberzeit-Männerzeit-Saeterehe-Hofehe-Freie Ehe. Classen, Hamburg.
