= Capitularia missorum specialia =

Two 802 acts of Charlemagne

The Capitulare missorum generale ("General capitulary on legates") and Capitularia missorum specialia ("Special capitularies on legates"), both issued in 802, were acts of Charlemagne whereby the role and functions of the missi dominici ("royal legates") were defined and placed on a permanent footing, as well as specific instructions sent out to the various missatica (the missi's territories).

== Editions ==
- "Capitulare Missorum Generale". Monumenta Germaniae Historica. Leges, Capitularia regum Francorum. Vol. IV, Karoli Magni Capitularia. pp. 91–99.
- "Capitularia Missorum Specialia". Monumenta Germaniae Historica. Leges, Capitularia regum Francorum. Vol. IV, Karoli Magni Capitularia. pp. 99–104.

== Sources ==
- Eckhardt, W. A. (1956). "Die capitularia missorum specialia 802". Deutsches Archiv für die Erforschung des Mittelalters. 12: 498–516.
- McKitterick, Rosamond (1983). The Frankish Kingdoms under the Carolingians, 751–987. London: Longman.
- McKitterick, Rosamond (2008). Charlemagne: The Formation of a European Identity. Cambridge: Cambridge University Press.
- Loyn, Henry Royston; Percival, John (1975). The Reign of Charlemagne. London: Hodder & Stoughton Educational.
