= Herbert Oskar Meyer =

German jurist and historian

Herbert Oskar Meyer (10 February 1875 in Breslau – 6 March 1941 in Berlin) was a German jurist and historian.
