= Theodrada =

- Abbess of Argenteuil
- Born: 784
- Died: Between 844 and 853 (aged 59–69)
- Father: Charlemagne
- Mother: Fastrada

Theodrada (ca. 784 – 844/853) was a daughter of Charlemagne (742–814) from his marriage to Fastrada. She became Abbess of the monastery of Argenteuil.

== Life ==
Theodrada was born the elder of the two daughters of Charlemagne's fourth wife Fastrada. Theodrada was the twelfth child of the Frankish king. By 814, she was the Abbess of Notre-Dame d'Argenteuil, A document estimated to be from the year 828 notes that Theodrada received Argenteuil from her father. The abbey became independent of the Abbey of Saint-Denis on the occasion of the transfer, and as a Carolingian house monastery, was directly subordinate to the Frankish king. However, in the aforementioned charter of 828, Theodrada restored the monastery to St. Denis on the condition that she would be allowed to use it for life, unless she voluntarily renounced it or was compensated with another monastery.
