= Himiltrude =

Concubine or wife of Charlemagne (c. 742 – c. 780)

- Born: 742?
- Died: 780?
- Concubine or Wife of: Charlemagne
- Issue: Pepin the Hunchback

Himiltrude (c. 742 – c. 780?) was the mother of Charlemagne's first-born son Pepin the Hunchback. Some historians have acknowledged her as the wife of Charlemagne, though she is often referred to as a concubine.

== Life ==
Little is known about Himiltrude's origins. Paul the Deacon calls her a "noble girl". The appearance of her name in the fraternity books of Alemannian monasteries may suggest an affiliation with the Germanic Alemannian or Alsatian nobility, while other sources make her the daughter of a Burgundian count and a granddaughter of Grimbert I, Count of Paris. It is not possible, however, to extrapolate any political ramifications from Charlemagne's relationship with Himiltrude.

Himiltrude probably entered into a relationship with Charlemagne during the lifetime of his father, Pepin the Short. When Charlemagne acceded to the throne in 768, Himiltrude remained unnamed in official sources – contrary to the example set by Charlemagne's mother, Bertrada of Laon. Himiltrude bore Charles a son called Pepin. Shortly after Pepin's birth, an alliance was formulated between Charlemagne and the King of the Lombards, Desiderius. To seal the alliance, it was agreed that Charlemagne should marry Desiderius' daughter (called Desiderata by modern scholars).

Himiltrude was dismissed at that time and disappears from historical records. A grave excavated in the monastery of Nivelles was found to contain the corpse of a forty-year-old woman, possibly identifiable with Himiltrude. If so, Himiltrude would appear to have died long after 770, although if and when she retired to Nivelles cannot be deduced. She is named in the confraternity books of Pfäfers, Reichenau, Remiremont and Saint Gall.

Her son Pepin, who had a spinal deformity and was called "the Hunchback", was eclipsed by Charlemagne's sons from his later marriage to Hildegard. Following an attempted rebellion against his father, Pepin was confined to a monastery.

== Marital status ==
The nature of Himiltrude's relationship to Charlemagne is a matter of dispute. Charlemagne's biographer Einhard calls her a "concubine" and Paulus Diaconus speaks of Pepin's birth "before legal marriage". A letter by Pope Stephen III seemingly referring to Charlemagne and his brother Carloman as being already married (to Himiltrude and Gerberga), and advising them not to dismiss their wives, has led many historians to believe that Himiltrude and Charlemagne were legally married. however the words employed by the pope could also simply mean that there had only been a promise of marriage and that they were thus only promised to each other. The acts of Adalard of Corbie supports this hypothesis, for his monastic vocation is described as due to the scruple he had regarding Charlemagne's dismissal of Princess Desiderata of the Lombards which occurred before any consummation of the marriage and possibly before any religious ceremony (it is unclear whether the marriage ever took place or if Desiderata only received the homage of the nobility in accordance with her planned future position of Queen of the Franks). If Adalard was scandalised by this dismissal, it is highly unlikely he would have been unfazed about Himiltrude's dismissal, had she truly been married to Charlemagne.

Historians have interpreted the information in different ways. Some, such as Pierre Riché, follow Einhard in describing Himiltrude as a concubine. Others, Dieter Hägemann for example, consider Himiltrude a wife in the full sense. Still others subscribe to the idea that the relationship between the two was "something more than concubinage, less than marriage" and describe it as a Friedelehe, a supposed form of marriage unrecognized by the Church and easily dissolvable. This form of relationship is often seen in a conflict between Christian marriage and more flexible Germanic concepts.
