= Missus dominicus =

Administrator commissioned by the Frankish king or Holy Roman Emperor

A missus dominicus (plural missi dominici), Latin for "envoy[s] of the lord [ruler]", also known in Dutch as Zendgraaf (German: Sendgraf), meaning "sent Graf", was an official commissioned by the Frankish king or Holy Roman Emperor to supervise the administration, mainly of justice, in parts of his dominions too remote for frequent personal visits. As such, the missus performed important intermediary functions between royal and local administrations. There are superficial points of comparison with the original Roman corrector, except that the missus was sent out on a regular basis. Four points made the missi effective as instruments of the centralized monarchy: the personal character of the missus, yearly change, isolation from local interests and the free choice of the king.

== Reign of Charlemagne ==
Based on Merovingian ad hoc arrangements, using the form missus regis (the "king's envoy") and sending a layman and an ecclesiastic in pairs, the use of missi dominici was fully exploited by Charlemagne (ruling 768–814), who made them a regular part of his administration, "a highly intelligent and plausible innovation in Carolingian government", Norman F. Cantor observes, "and a tribute to the administrative skill of the ecclesiastics, such as Alcuin and Einhard". The missi were at first chosen from Charlemagne's personal, most trusted entourage, of whatever social degree. Soon they were selected only from the secular and ecclesiastical nobility: the entry for 802 in the so-called Lorsch Annals (794–803) states that instead of relying on "poorer vassals", Charlemagne "chose from the kingdom archbishops and bishops and abbots, with dukes and counts, who now had no need to receive gifts from the innocent, and sent them throughout his kingdom, so that they might administer justice to the churches, to widows, orphans and the poor, and to all the people." Presumably the same year the capitulary usually known as the Capitulare missorum generale was issued, which gives a detailed account of their duties and responsibilities. They were to execute justice, to ensure respect for the king, to control the government of the military dukes and administrative counts (then still royal officials), to receive their oath of allegiance, to let the king's will be known, at times by distributing capitularies around the empire, and to supervise the clergy of their assigned region. In short, they were the direct representatives of the king or Holy Roman Emperor. The inhabitants of the district they administered had to provide for their subsistence, and at times they led the host to battle. The missi were protected by a triple wergeld and resistance to them was punishable by death. In addition special instructions were given to various missi, and many of these have been preserved.

As missi became a conventional part of court machinery, missus ad hoc came to signify missi sent out for some particular purpose. The districts placed under the ordinary missi, which it was their duty to visit for a month at a time, four times a year, were called missatici or legationes (a term illustrating the analogy with a papal legate); the missatica (singular missaticum) avoided division along the lines of the existing dioceses or provinces. The missi were not permanent officials, but were generally selected from the ranks of officials at the court, and during the reign of Charlemagne high-standing personages undertook this work. They were sent out collegially, usually in twos, an ecclesiastic and a layman, and were generally complete strangers to the district which they administered, to deter them from putting out local roots and acting on their own initiative, as the counts were doing. In addition extraordinary missi represented the emperor on special occasions, and at times beyond the limits of his dominions. Even under the strong rule of Charlemagne it was difficult to find men to discharge these duties impartially, and after his death in 814 it became almost impossible.

== Reigns of Louis the Pious and Charles the Bald ==
Under Charlemagne's surviving legitimate son, Louis the Pious (ruling 813–840), the process of disintegration was hastened. Once the king associated the choice of missi with the assembly of nobles, the nobles interfered in the appointment of the missi. The missi were later selected from the district in which their duties lay, which led to their association with local hereditary filiations and in general a focus upon their own interests rather than that of the king. The 825 list of missi reveals that the circuits of the missatica now corresponded with provinces, strengthening local powers. The duties of missi, who gradually increased in number, became merged in the ordinary work of the bishops and counts, and under the emperor Charles the Bald (ruling 843–877), who was repeatedly pressured by bishops to send out missi, they took control of associations for the preservation of the peace. Louis the German (ruling 843–876) is not known to have sent out missi. About the end of the ninth century, with the implosion of Carolingian power, the missi disappeared from France and during the 10th century from Italy.

The missi were the last attempt to preserve centralised control in the Holy Roman Empire. In the course of the ninth century, the forces which were making for feudalism tended to produce inherited fiefdoms as the only way to ensure stability, especially in the face of renewed external aggression in the form of Viking attacks, to which the impaired central power was demonstrated to be impotent.

== Sources and external links ==
- Capitulare missorum generale ("General Capitulary of the Missi"), Spring 802, ed. G. Pertz, MGH Cap. 1, no. 33; ed. Boretius, no. 60, p. 147; tr. H.R. Loyn and J. Percival, The Reign of Charlemagne. London, 1975. pp. 73–9; tr. D.C. Munro, "General Capitulary of the Missi (802) [no. 5]". In Translations and Reprints from the Original Sources of European history. Vol. 6. Philadelphia, University of Pennsylvania Press, 1900. pp. 16–8. Available online
- Capitularia missorum speciale, ed. G. Pertz, MGH Cap. 1, no. 34; tr. H.R. Loyn and J. Percival, The Reign of Charlemagne. London, 1975. pp. 79–82.
- Lorsch Annals, ed. G. Pertz, MGH Scriptores 1. entry for 802, pp. 38–9.
- Catholic Encyclopaedia (passim)

== See also ==
- St. Paulinus II, Patriarch of Aquileia and one of twelve episcopal missi dominici in Pistoia under Charlemagne
- Theodulf of Orléans, a bishop and missus dominicus under Charlemagne
- Capitulary of Servais, sending missi dominici to twelve missatica under Charles the Bald in 853
