= Luitgard (Frankish queen) =

Queen of the Franks from 794 to 800

Queen consort of the Franks
- Tenure: 794–800
- Born: 776
- Died: 4 June 800; Tours
- Burial: Tour Charlemagne
- Spouse: Charlemagne (m. c. 794)
- Father: Luitfrid II de Sundgau

Luitgard (born around 776, died 4 June 800) was the last wife of Charlemagne.

Luitgard was the daughter of Luitfrid II of Sundgau, an Alamannian count, and Hiltrude of Wormsgau. She married Charlemagne in 794, when he was around 50 years old.

Little is known of her, except that the king found in her a calm and virtuous woman; at court, she was even appreciated by his children. Alcuin praises Luitgarde's love of letters: of her he says, “The queen loves to converse with learned and learned men; after his devotional exercises, it is his dearest pastime. She is full of complaisance for the king, pious, blameless and worthy of all the love of such a husband." She also accompanied Charlemagne on the great hunt each year.

Luitgard seems to have been involved in the distribution of the Avar treasure, after Charlemagne's invasion of their polity.

Luitgard died of an unknown illness on 4 June 800 at the monastery of Saint-Martin de Tours, during a tour with Charlemagne in Neustria, preceding his trip to Rome where, just over six months later, he was crowned Imperator Romanorum ("Emperor of the Romans"). She was buried there, and although the location of her tomb is not precisely known, reportedly it is under the Charlemagne Tower associated with Basilica of Saint Martin, Tours. She and Charlemagne had no children, and he did not remarry again.

According to 15th century chronicles from Oxford University, Luitgard had a sister, Redburga/Redburh, who met Ecgberht, later to be King of Wessex, while he was exiled in West Francia by Beorhtric of Wessex and Offa of Mercia; the two later married.

== Notes ==
Royal titles
Preceded by Fastrada	Queen of the Franks c. 794–800	Succeeded by Ermengarde of Hesbaye
