= Charles the Younger =

Son of Charlemagne (c. 772–811)

Duke of Maine King of the Franks
- Reign: 789–811
- Coronation: 25 December 800
- Born: c. 772
- Died: 4 December 811
- Dynasty: Carolingian
- Father: Charlemagne
- Mother: Hildegard

Charles the Younger (c. 772 – 4 December 811) (French: Charles le Jeune) was the son of the Frankish ruler Charlemagne and his wife Queen Hildegard. Charlemagne's second son, Charles gained favour over his older, possibly illegitimate half brother Pepin. Charles was entrusted with lands and important military commands by his father. In 800, Charlemagne was crowned emperor by Pope Leo III, and during this ceremony Charles was anointed a king. Charles was designated as the heir of the bulk of Charlemagne's lands but predeceased his father, leaving the empire to be inherited by his younger brother Louis the Pious.

== Life ==
Charles was born in 772 or 773 to the Frankish king Charlemagne and his wife Hildegard. Charles was Charlemagne's second son, having an older half-brother named Pepin, called Pepin the Hunchback. In 774, as Charlemagne was besieging Pavia, capital of the Lombard Kingdom, he sent for Hildegard and his sons to join the army at the camp outside the city. Charlemagne conquered the city by June 774, becoming king of the Lombards in addition to being king of the Franks. Charlemagne and his family returned north to Francia by July or August. There is little recorded of the rest of Charles' childhood. It is known that Charlemagne had all his children educated in the liberal arts, and his sons received training in riding, combat, and hunting.

In 781, Charlemagne and Hildegard brought their younger children, including their sons Carloman and Louis to Rome, leaving Pepin and Charles in Francia. In Rome, Pope Adrian I baptized the children, and in the process Carloman was renamed Pepin, now sharing a name with his half-brother. The newly renamed Pepin and Louis were also then anointed and crowned, Pepin appointed king of the Lombards and Louis king of Aquitaine. The two new kings, still young children, were sent to their new kingdoms to be raised by regents and advisors in their own courts. Italy and Aquitaine were additions to Charlemagne's realm, and it is possible that in assigning them to his younger sons, Charlemagne intended the core Frankish kingdom to be a split inheritance between Charles and the elder Pepin.

Charles received his first command as he came of age in 784, leading an army in Westphalia during a campaign of the Saxon Wars. From then on, Charles "gained continual prominence a his father's deputy" and he would continue to be given army commands in Saxony. In 789, Charlemagne granted Charles rule of "the kingdom west of the Seine," corresponding to the Duchy of Maine in Neustria. It was proposed that Charles wed Ælfflæd, daughter of King Offa of Mercia and forge an alliance between the Franks and the Anglo-Saxon king. Offa was amenable, but insisted that Charles' sister Bertha also be married to his own son. Charlemagne was insulted by this, and the marriage did not occur. Charlemagne declared a blockade on all trade from England, which lasted three years until a treaty negotiated by Alcuin of York was agreed to.

Map of the Frankish empire. Charles ruled the portion of Neustria west of the Seine during his lifetime, and was intended to inherit the majority of the kingdom.

Dissension seemingly grew between Charles and his elder half-brother. Wandelbert, a monk writing in the mid-ninth century, recounts a story of the two brothers travelling with their father down the Rhine, each in their own boat. By chance, both stopped at the church dedicated to Saint Goar and, moved by the holiness of the church and the saint, "they now came together in brotherly concord and a pledge of friendship." This dissension between Charles and Pepin was likely over the succession. Pepin was the son of Himiltrude, whose precise relationship with Charlemagne was unclear. (Note: A 770 letter by Pope Stephen III describes both Carloman and Charlemagne "by [God's] will and decision...joined in lawful marriage...[with] wives of great beauty from the same fatherland as yourselves." Stephen wrote this in the context of attempting to dissuade either king from entering into a marriage alliance with Desiderius. By 784, at Charlemagne's court, Paul the Deacon wrote that their son Pepin was born "before legal marriage", but whether he means Charles and Himiltrude were never married, were joined in a non-canonical marriage or friedelehe, or if they married after Pepin was born is unclear. Roger Collins, Johannes Fried, and Janet Nelson all portray Himiltrude as a wife of Charlemagne in some capacity.) By the 780s, Pepin was seen as illegitimate, and though earlier Frankish inheritance practices did not distinguish sons by their mother's marital status, it seems this distinction was becoming important. This apparent sidelining of Pepin was signaled by Charles' status as his father's deputy on campaigns, while Pepin received no such commands. Following his grant of lands in Maine, Charles began to be described as primogenitus, or "first-born", despite Pepin being older. In 792, Pepin conspired with Bavarian nobles to assassinate Charlemagne, Charles, Pepin and Louis (who had all gathered at Regensburg) and install himself as king. The plot was discovered and revealed to Charlemagne. Pepin was sent to a monastery and many of his co-conspirators were executed.

In 800 Charles joined his father in surveying his lands and defenses in Neustria where Danish pirates had been raiding, before the two travelled to Rome together. Charlemagne went to Rome to oversee the restoration of Pope Leo III. At mass on Christmas Day, 25 December 800, Leo crowned Charlemagne as emperor and anointed Charles as a king.

Charles continued to be a key lieutenant and military leader for his father, as Charlemagne rarely led armies directly in his later year. In 804, Charles was assigned the privilege of escorting Leo III north on the Pope's final visit to Francia. Frankish annals record Charles' successful campaigns against the Bohemians, Sorbs, and other Slavic groups in 805 and 806. In 806, Charlemagne issued the Divisio Regnorum, which outlined formalized plans for the inheritance of the empire upon his death. Charles, as his eldest son in good favour, was given the largest share of the inheritance, with rule of Francia proper along with Saxony, Nordgau, and parts of Alemannia. Louis and the younger Pepin were confirmed in their kingdoms of Aquitaine and Italy, and gained additional territories, with most of Bavaria and Alemmannia given to Pepin and Provence, Septimania, and parts of Burgundy to Louis. Charlemagne did not address the inheritance of the imperial title. The Divisio also addressed the death of any of the brothers, and urged peace between them and between any of their nephews who might inherit. In 808, Charles led the Frankish armies that responded to the incursion of the Danish king Gudfred.

Charlemagne's succession plans did not come to fruition. Pepin of Italy, along with his sister Rotrude, aunt Gisela, Abbess of Chelles, and his half brother Pepin the Hunchback died in quick succession in 810–811. Charles followed them, dying on 4 December 811. All were possibly victims of an epidemic that had spread from cattle in 810. Charles' place of death and burial are unknown. In the wake of these deaths, Charlemagne declared Pepin's son Bernard ruler of Italy, and his own only surviving son Louis as heir to the rest of the empire. Louis was crowned as emperor in 813, and would fully succeed Charlemagne upon his death in 814.
