= Pepin of Italy =

King of Italy, son of Charlemagne (777–810)

Pepin
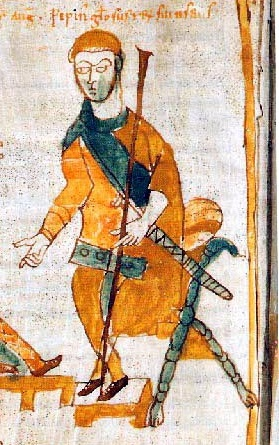
- Pepin depicted on a 10th century copy of a manuscript originally made in 829–836.

King of Italy
- Reign: 781 – 810
- Coronation: 781; Rome
- Predecessor: Charlemagne
- Successor: Charlemagne and Bernard
- Born: Carloman; 777
- Died: 8 July 810 (aged 33)
- Consort: Theodrada
- Issue more...: Bernard, King of Italy; Adalhaid; Arula; Gundrada; Berthaid; Theodrada
- House: Carolingian
- Father: Charlemagne
- Mother: Hildegard

Pepin or Pippin (born Carloman), (777 – 8 July 810) was King of Italy from 781 until his death in 810. He was the third son of Charlemagne (and his second with Queen Hildegard). Upon his baptism in 781, Carloman was renamed Pepin, where he was also crowned as king of the Lombard Kingdom his father had conquered. Pepin ruled the kingdom from a young age under Charlemagne, but predeceased his father. His son Bernard was named king of Italy after him, and his descendants were the longest-surviving direct male line of the Carolingian dynasty.

== Life ==
Carloman was born in 777, the second son of Charlemagne and his wife Hildegard. Carloman had an older brother, Charles the Younger, and half brother Pepin the Hunchback, Charlemagne's eldest son. Charlemagne had been king of the Franks since 768, and in 774 conquered the Kingdom of the Lombards in northern Italy, partially on the request of Pope Adrian I for assistance against the Lombard king Desiderius. In 781, Charlemagne and Hildegard brought Carloman along with his younger brother Louis the Pious and sisters Rotrude and Bertha, daughter of Charlemagne to Rome at Adrian's request. Carloman was four years old, but his parents had delayed his baptism so that the Pope could perform it. Carloman was baptized, and Adrian then crowned him as king of the Lombards (later styled king of Italy) and his brother Louis as king of Aquitaine. As part of Carloman's baptism, he was renamed Pepin, now sharing a name with his half-brother. The reason behind the name change is obscure, but it was likely chosen to evoke the memory of his grandfather Pepin the Short, remembered as a staunch ally of the papacy, and this legacy was important to emphasize for the young king who was to rule Italy.

Though only four years old, Pepin's coronation was not nominal—he was brought to Lombardy to live under the care of advisors provided by Charlemagne, the most important of which were Adalard of Corbie, Waldo of Reichenau, the Lombard duke Rotchild, and Angilbert. Pepin's court was based primarily at Verona, though he also operated from palaces in Mantua and the traditional Lombard capital of Pavia. Pepin was king in his own name, but Charlemagne took a strong hand in Italy even into Pepin's adulthood, even on occasion issuing laws directly.

After Pepin came of age, he began fulfilling his role as a military leader. He participated in his father's campaign against Tassilo III of Bavaria in 786. In 796, he led a campaign against the Avar Khaganate, taking their stronghold and precipitating the collapse of the Avar state, allowing the Frankish realm to expand eastward. Pepin's victory was celebrated in the contemporary Latin poem De Pippini regis Victoria Avarica. Pepin also led multiple raids against the Duchy of Benevento and a successful campaign in 810 against the Republic of Venice.

In 806, Charlemagne gathered his sons and issued the Divisio Regnorum, which outlined formalized plans for the inheritance of the empire upon his death. Pepin was confirmed in this rule of Italy while also gaining most of Bavaria and Alamannia; Louis gained Provence, Septimania, and most of Burgundy in addition to Aquitaine; and Charles as his eldest son in good favour (Pepin the Hunchback having been confined to a monastery after a failed rebellion), was given the largest share of the inheritance, with rule of Francia proper along with Saxony, Nordgau, and parts of Alemannia. Charlemagne did not address the inheritance of the title of emperor he had gained in 800. The Divisio also addressed the death of any of the brothers, and urged peace between them and between any of their nephews who might inherit.

Charlemagne's succession plans did not come to fruition. Pepin died on 8 July 810, followed in quick succession by the deaths of his sister Rotrude, his aunt Gisela, Abbess of Chelles, and his half brother Pepin, and his brother Charles over the course of 810–811. All were possibly victims of an epidemic that had spread from cattle in 810. In the wake of these deaths, Charlemagne declared Pepin's son Bernard ruler of Italy, and his own only surviving son Louis as heir to the rest of the empire. Louis and Bernard were formally invested as Charlemagne's heirs in September of 813, and would fully succeed upon his death in 814.

== Family and descendants ==
Pepin was married to Theodrada, who was his father's cousin and sister to his advisor Adalard. His brother Louis would use the close relation between Pepin and his wife to portray the marriage as illegitimate in order to sideline Bernard. Bernard's male-line descendants continued to rule as counts of Vermandois in France into the eleventh century, longer than any other agnatic descendants of Charlemagne. In addition to Bernard, Pepin had five daughters: Adalhaid (the wife of Lambert I of Nantes and mother of Guy I of Spoleto), Arula, Gundrada, Berthaid, and Theodrada (the wife of Lambert II of Nantes and mother of Lambert III of Nantes). After Pepin's death, Charlemagne took the girls into his own household. Pepin was also an ancestor of Hugh Capet, the first King of France from the House of Capet.

Pepin Carloman Carolingian dynasty Born: April 777 Died: 8 July 810
Regnal titles
Preceded by Charlemagne	King of Italy; 15 April 781 – 8 July 810 with Charlemagne (774–814)	Succeeded by Charlemagne; Bernard
