= Pepin the Hunchback =

Frankish prince and rebel (c. 768–811)

- Born: ca. 768 or 769; Frankish Empire
- Died: 811 (aged 42); Prüm
- Dynasty: Carolingian
- Father: Charlemagne
- Mother: Himiltrude

Pepin (or Pippin) the Hunchback (French: Pépin le Bossu, German: Pippin der Buckelige; 768/769 – 811) was a Frankish prince. He was the eldest son of Charlemagne and noblewoman Himiltrude. He developed a humped back after birth, leading early medieval historians to give him the epithet "hunchback". He lived with his father's court after Charlemagne dismissed his mother and married Desiderata. Around 781, Pepin's half brother Carloman was rechristened as "Pepin"—a step that may have signaled Charlemagne's decision to disinherit the elder Pepin, for a variety of possible reasons. In 792, Pepin the Hunchback revolted against his father with a group of leading Frankish nobles, but the plot was discovered and put down before the conspiracy could be put into action. Charlemagne commuted Pepin's death sentence, having him tonsured and exiled to the monastery of Prüm instead. Since his death in 811, Pepin has been the subject of numerous works of historical fiction.

== Legitimacy ==
The circumstances of Pepin's birth remain unclear to modern scholars, especially regarding the legitimacy of his mother's union to Charles. Most Carolingian-era sources dismiss Charles' first union as illegitimate. The contemporary historian Einhard writes merely that Pepin was born to a "concubine", and he does not list him among Charlemagne's legitimate offspring. Although it is possible that Pepin was born to a now-forgotten concubine, Einhard is probably referring to Himiltrude—the first child-bearing partner of Charlemagne, about whom little is now known. However, Einhard and most other Carolingian historians worked in the courts of Charlemagne's successors and had a vested interest in undermining the legitimacy of the claims of other potential royal lines. These writers may have maligned Charles' union to Himiltrude after the fact in order to lend a post facto justification to Pepin's later disinheritance.

It is possible that the union of Charlemagne and Himiltrude was a Germanic form of marriage with fewer obligations than the sacramental marriage of the Church—what some medievalists have called Friedelehe—although the concept is controversial. Paul the Deacon writes in his Gesta Episcoporum Mettensium that Pepin was born ante legale connubium or "before legal marriage", but his meaning is unclear: he does not specify as to whether Charles and Himiltrude were not fully, legally married by the church, or if they simply got married after Pepin was born. In a letter to Charlemagne, Pope Stephen III describes the relationship as a legitimate marriage, but he had a vested interest in preventing Charlemagne from taking a new wife—the daughter of Lombard King Desiderius, who was a major political enemy of the papacy.

After Charles ignored Stephen's advice and married the Lombard princess Desiderata, the story of Himiltrude might have been altered and forgotten. Perhaps Charles' resentment over a deformed son led him to divorce Himiltrude once an opportune and advantageous time arrived. Another possibility is that when Pepin's hunchback became evident, stories needed to change to accommodate a different heir. At any rate, concepts like legitimacy and rightful inheritance were very likely more fluid for the Carolingians than they were for later monarchies—an ambiguity that continues to provoke debate about Pepin's disinheritance. What is known fairly certainly is that Charles fathered a son with a woman named Himiltrude, with whom he may or may not have been married.

== Name ==
The nature of Pepin's birth is further illuminated by an understanding of his name and the customs of naming children during this time. Carolingian aristocrats frequently named newborn children after successful ancestors. This tradition was more than a mere homage to dead relatives—it seems that the Carolingians saw naming customs as a way to help children assume the historical roles of their eponymous ancestors.

The Carolingian dynasty was dominated by the name "Pepin": it had been Charles' father's name, as well as that of several other members of the royal line. In fact, Charles' brother and political rival Carloman named his firstborn Pepin before Charles was even married. Charles, then, was naturally inclined to name his first son "Pepin"—announcing his own dynastic ambitions, clearing the ground for the eventual recognition of his son as emperor. However, Notker the Stammerer, writing long after Pepin's death, suggests that it was Himiltrude (Pepin's mother) and not Charles who gave Pepin his name.

== Disfavour ==
Pepin apparently continued to live at his father's court even after Charlemagne dismissed Himiltrude to marry Desiderata around 770. Only after Charlemagne's marriage to Hildegard and the birth of new male heirs like Charles the Younger (772) and Carloman (773), did Pepin's position seem to become more precarious. In either 780 or 781, Charles had the young Carloman baptized by Pope Hadrian in Rome, renaming him Pepin. The Poeta Saxo, a 9th-century Latin poet who records the events of Charlemagne's reign, states that while Charlemagne "attended the solemnties of Easter the venerable Pope administered soul-saving baptism to Charles' son Pepin [formerly Carloman]." Charles had added another, more fit Pepin to his lineage—an apparent snub that many historians have interpreted as the beginning of Pepin the Hunchback's disinheritance. However, a dearth of documents and credible contemporary historians leaves the question up for debate, and some have even argued that Pepin retained a full stake in the inheritance of the kingdom right up until his rebellion in 792.

=== Late disinheritance theory ===
Charlemagne was extremely conscious of the notions of succession and inheritance during his lifetime, even refusing to marry off his daughters to the Frankish nobility. This quirk scandalized later contemporary historians ("Strange to say," Einhard writes, "he never wanted to give any one of them in marriage to anybody") and probably reflects Charlemagne's reluctance to leave problematic heirs that could interfere with a peaceful succession after his death. But in spite of all the potential difficulties that Pepin presented for the succession—particularly his dubious birth and problematic deformity—sources suggest that Charlemagne treated him with affection and even respect. Even after Carloman was rechristened "Pepin", Charlemagne maintained the older Pepin at his court, right alongside Charles the Younger, one of Charlemagne's sons by Hildegard.

Charlemagne named Charles the Younger "King of the Franks" when he divided his kingdom in 806, and to some historians this suggests that Pepin the Hunchback was also being groomed for future kingship, perhaps for the "lion's share" of Francia, before his rebellion in 792. According to historian Janet Nelson, the rechristening of Carloman probably had more to do with satisfying "political interests outside [Charlemagne's] family," than it did with disinheriting the original Pepin. Particularly, the christening of an Italian king named Pepin reaffirmed the Franks' historical commitment to the papacy: it was probably meant to evoke the pro-papal policies of Charles' father Pepin the Short.

=== Early disinheritance theory ===
Other historians see the baptism of Carloman as a repudiation of Pepin, and trace the systematic rejection of Pepin's claims to the throne in the subsequent actions of Charlemagne and his court. Walter Goffart argues that the Gesta Episcoporum Mettensium, written by Paul the Deacon in the 780s before Pepin's revolt, reveals the "succession plan" of Charlemagne and his court—a plan that left no room for a hunchbacked king. According to Goffart, Paul uses his history of the ancestry of Charlemagne as an allegory for the current succession by depicting the Frankish kingship as a "birthright" handed down from a father to only one son, like those passed down among Biblical patriarchs. Like Esau, Pepin was rejected in favor of his younger brothers: Charlemagne, "like Isaac in the Bible, had no more than one blessing to bestow." Goffart and like-minded historians even speculate that Charlemagne and his court offered Pepin a sort of quid pro quo: in return for surrendering his claim to the throne, "the Hunchback may have been promised that he would become bishop of Metz."

There are also more concrete reasons for believing that Pepin was passed over for the succession. While he apparently remained at court with Charlemagne's third wife Fastrada, Charles the Younger joined Charlemagne on important campaigns and even led large detachments of troops. As Goffart puts it, Charlemagne increasingly tasked "Charles the Younger to responsible commands, while leaving Pepin in the shade."

Changing standards of marriage might have undermined Pepin's claims to the throne. Charlemagne's intimate relationships with both wives and concubines drew much criticism from his contemporaries—a monk from Reichenau even reported a "vision" he had in which he saw Charlemagne being gruesomely punished in purgatory for his marital sins. Indeed, the medieval historians who dismissed Pepin's mother as a concubine were often the same intellectuals and religious reformers who pushed for the imposition of orthodox Catholic practices throughout the Frankish domains, and the abandonment of old pre-Christian customs. Such reformers would have rejected the morality of friedelehe outright, even if Himiltrude was technically Charlemagne's legal wife under old Germanic law. Some historians have argued that this morality shift—a move to more orthodox Catholic definitions of marriage—helped push Pepin into the background. If Charles wanted to impose Catholic notions of orthodoxy on his domains, then he needed to abandon Pepin—the incarnate symbol of what was at best a pre-Christian variety of marriage and at worst an un-Christian concubinage. Moreover, the notoriously "uxorious" Charles might have bowed to pressure from Hildegard, who wanted her own son to enjoy the most legitimate claim to the throne.

== Revolt ==
In 792 Pepin the Hunchback attempted to overthrow his father with the help of a faction of discontented Frankish nobles. The plan however was discovered and thwarted before it could be put into action.

=== Context ===
The historical context of the rebellion deserves explanation, as Pepin's plot seems to be more than a mere dynastic struggle. To begin with, a poor harvest caused a famine in 792—often an omen of political strife in medieval Europe. Nor was Pepin's revolt an isolated political event; the Saxons also revolted in 793, and Grimoald III, Duke of Benevento, incited acts of hostility in Italy. Although it seems likely that the famine contributed to the general strife in the Carolingian domains around 792, a single bad harvest does not make a revolt. The local nobility had recently been the target of new royal measures handed down by Charles in order to consolidate power and "check the abuses of local counts." He instructed the nobility to take a new oath of loyalty to him as king: "I, [the oath-taker], promise that in relation to my lord King Charles and his sons I am faithful and I shall be so for all of my life without treachery or evil intentions." This increased presence of central authority might have chafed the aristocracy, opening the door for a palace coup directed against Charlemagne.

Additionally, both the Royal Frankish Annals and Einhard cite Fastrada, who seems to have been poorly received by many members of court, as a factor in the rebellion. Both of the major uprisings against the throne during Charles' reign—Hardrad's in 786 and Pepin's in 792—occurred during Fastrada's tenure as his wife and queen. As cited in 792 of the Royal Frankish Annals, "A conspiracy was made against him [Charles] by his oldest son Pepin and some Franks, who claimed that they were unable to bear the cruelty of Queen Fastrada and therefore conspired against the king's life." Einhard's Vita Karoli Magni confirms: "It is supposed that the cruelty of Queen Fastrada was the primary cause of these plots, and they were both due to Charles' apparent acquiescence in his wife's cruel conduct, and deviation from the usual kindness and gentleness of his disposition." Historian Carl Hammer paraphrases Einhard's position, suggesting the revolt was caused by "crudelitas, the extraordinary harshness, of Charlemagne's wife, Fastrada, which had subverted the normal clemency of the king's rule."

It is unclear what acts of cruelty were perpetrated by Fastrada against Pepin (or, more likely, against the nobles who encouraged Pepin); but she seems to have exacerbated existing tensions between Charlemagne and the aristocracy.

Charles was away from his central kingdom during 792, residing in Bavaria (at Regensburg) in order to better manage his campaign against the Avars. According to Einhard's account, instead of accompanying his father, Pepin the Hunchback faked sickness. Einhard explains: "When Charles was at war with the Huns, and was wintering in Bavaria, this Pepin shammed sickness, and plotted against his father in company with some of the leading Franks, who seduced him with vain promises of the royal authority." Since Einhard was a member of the royal court, his description of Pepin's motivation may be discounted.

=== Discovery of the plot ===
With Charles away, Pepin and his fellow discontented nobles plotted his assassination. The Poeta Saxo offers a particularly damning account of Pepin and the other rebels, reporting:

[W]icked men conceived a great crime which almost blotted out forever the shining light of the Franks, for they busied themselves in many ways plotting to put the king to death. For this purpose a cruel conspiracy is said to have been formed among the Frankish nobles. Conspicuous among them, the king's oldest son madly offered himself as the author of this crime, being more ignoble in his own worthless character than in his birth.

— Poeta Saxo, Year 792

However, a Lombard named Fardulf exposed the plot and reported it to Charles. He was later made abbot at St. Denis in thanks for his service to the throne in this event. When the co-conspirators were captured and accused of breaking their holy oaths (i.e. as mentioned above), they professed a technical innocence against the charge of oath-breaking, claiming they had not actually taken the oath in question (a claim that seems unlikely). This is a rather weak defense, as it does not mitigate the charge of attempted regicide.

The court and king found all of the conspirators guilty, confiscated their lands and condemned them to death as punishment. However, some of the conspirators walked away with their lives, Pepin included. Charles was likely unwilling to put to death his first-born son, who still seemed to hold some of his father's affection. As historian Pierre Riché suggests, "The revolt in 792 of his bastard son Pippin the Hunchback especially distressed him," no doubt as a result of their kinship. Nonetheless, punishment was still necessary, so Pepin was tonsured and took up the habit of monkhood. As Einhard describes, "When his [Pepin's] deceit was discovered and the conspirators were punished, his head was shaved, and he was suffered, in accordance with his wishes, to devote himself to a religious life in the monastery of Prüm."

In Joanna Story's book Charlemagne: Empire and Society, historian Stewart Airlie points out a possible upshot of Pepin's revolt. He suggests that "Pippin's conspiracy was the last rising against Charlemagne and its suppression permitted the king to slim the royal family down further: only the sons of Hildegard were to inherit..." However, Airlie also points out that the cost of the revolt to Charlemagne was more expansive than the mere insult and threat of death. The Annals of Lorsch entry for 793, the year after the revolt, indicates that Charlemagne's loyal retainers were "rewarded abundantly." Charlemagne could not merely punish the members of his court who had been conspirators, "but he also had to reward those who had taken no part in it with gold, silver and silks. Their loyalty could not be taken for granted."

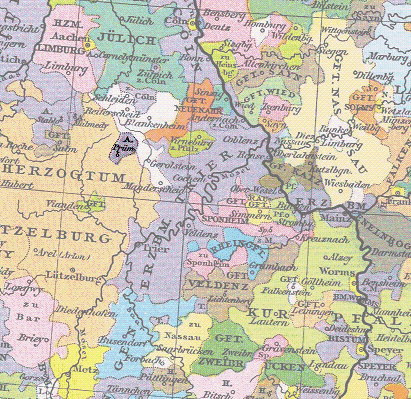
Imperial Abbey of Prüm, cropped from a map of the Holy Roman Empire as at 1400.

== Monastic life and death ==
Pepin became a monk and settled at the abbey of Prüm. Located near the confluence of the Rhine and Moselle rivers, just north of modern-day Luxembourg, Prüm was far from the heart of Charlemagne's empire and therefore a fitting site for exile. Pepin spent his remaining years there, sheltered from political intrigues and upheavals.

In 806 Charlemagne, careful to ensure a smooth transition of power upon his death, issued the divisio regnorum, a royal decree that divided the lands of his kingdom into three separate territories, which would be divided among his three "remaining" sons (though Pepin the Hunchback was still alive at the time): Charles the Younger, Pepin (Carloman), and Louis. There is some ambivalence as to whether Pepin the Hunchback's exclusion from the divisio was a result of the revolt of 792 or the supposed and aforementioned illegitimate nature of his birth.

Sometime around 811, Pepin died while at Prüm, likely from plague. Historians dispute the actual date, but evidence seem to suggest it ranged from 810 to 811.

== Deformity and stigma ==
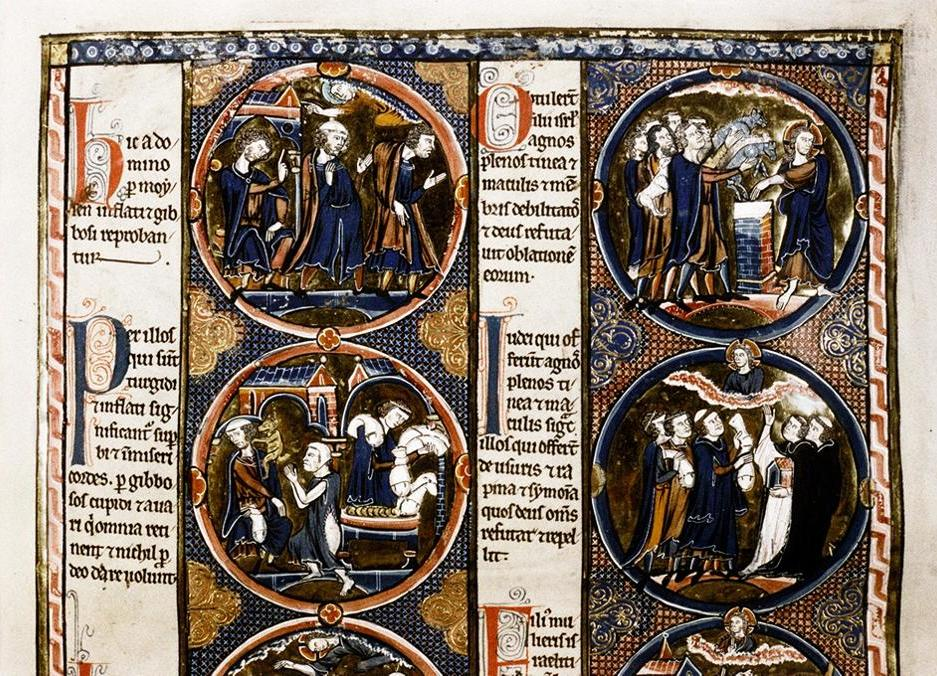
Depiction of Moses and Aaron rejecting a hunchback in an illuminated manuscript of the 21st chapter of Leviticus. Bible moralisée, part I. Folio #: fol. 064r. Bodl.270b_roll329.1_frame3

Pepin's physical deformation clearly complicated his succession to the throne, but it is unclear how his hunchback would have been perceived by his contemporaries. Many medieval people probably believed that physical deformation or disability was an outward manifestation of spiritual corruption, a position that was partially informed by passages from the Bible:

For no one who has a defect shall approach: a blind man, or a lame man, or he who has a disfigured face, or any deformed limb, or a man who has a broken foot or broken hand, or a hunchback or a dwarf, or one who has a defect in his eye or eczema or scabs or crushed testicles. No man among the descendants of Aaron the priest who has a defect is to come near to offer the LORD's offerings by fire; since he has a defect, he shall not come near to offer the food of his God. He may eat the food of his God, both of the most holy and of the holy, only he shall not go in to the veil or come near the altar because he has a defect, so that he will not profane My sanctuaries. For I am the LORD who sanctifies them.

— Leviticus 21:18–23, New American Standard Bible

In spite of this isolated part of the Old Testament's association of deformity with uncleanliness, Christian writers like Isidore of Seville and Augustine of Hippo who followed Jesus maintained that physically disabled people were not inhuman or demonic. Augustine, who exercised a considerable intellectual influence on Carolingian thinkers, wrote in his treatise City of God that "the deserts of souls are not to be estimated by the qualities of bodies." As one historian puts it, Augustine and his disciples believed that the role of individual deformities was "hidden from human understanding, but had significance in God's divine plan of creation." Pepin's life demonstrates this ambiguous position of deformed and disabled people in Carolingian society—individuals who traveled through life apparently cursed by God, but for reasons incomprehensible to humans. Einhard calls Pepin "handsome of face, but hunchbacked," and dissociates him completely from Charlemagne's other progeny. Notker the Stammerer, however, treats Pepin's disability as more of a mundane inconvenience than a sign from God: he writes, with a hint of droll humor, that "all deformed people tend to be more irritable than those who are properly proportioned." Significantly, no early medieval record of Pepin directly links his deformity to his treason against Charlemagne. Although some of his contemporaries might have read spiritual implications into his hunchback, Pepin's disability seemed to cause more political than moral problems for the Carolingian succession. Apprehension about the fitness of a disabled leader hurt his chances of attaining power, just as they might for a modern head of state.

== Early sources ==
Like many figures of the time period, few of the historical facts about Pepin have been fixed with certainty. Most of what is known about him comes from just a handful of early medieval annals and histories. Understanding the context of these sources, as well as their built-in biases and shortcomings, is essential to understanding Pepin. One of the earliest, most contemporary descriptions of Pepin is found in the Gesta Episcoporum Mettensium, an ecclesiastical history of the see of Metz written by Paul the Deacon around 785. Paul often digresses into broader themes of Carolingian history, and some historians (like Walter Goffart) read a great deal about the plight of Pepin into the supposedly allegorical histories that Paul provides of Charlemagne's ancestors. Paul also touches on Pepin directly, at least occasionally:

By his wife Hildegard, Charles begat four sons and five daughters. Before legal marriage, however, he had from Himiltrude, a young noblewoman, a son named Pepin. Now the names of the sons whom Hildegard bore him are as follows: the first is called Charles, that is, called after the name of his father and great-grandfather; the second is again Pepin, the namesake of his brother and grandfather; the third, Louis, was of the same birth as Lothar, who died in his second year. Of these, by God's favor, Pepin Minor now holds the kingdom of Italy and Louis that of Aquitaine.

— Paul the Deacon, Gesta Episcoporum Mettensium

Historical appraisal of the Gesta has varied widely over time, however, and many historians see it as more of a "literary curiosity" with only an incidental or inadvertent historical value. Even Goffart admits that historians value much of Paul's work only as a mere "repository of legends."

Another nearly contemporary source for the life of Pepin are the Lorsch Annals, a series of historical entries compiled by Frankish monks during the life of Charlemagne. The annals provide one of the best early accounts of Pepin's revolt:

And there came to light this year a most wicked plot which Pippin, the king's son by a concubine named Himiltrud, [set in motion] against the life of the king and of his sons by a lawfully wedded wife, for they intended to kill the king and those sons and Pippin sought to reign in the king's place, like Abimelech in the days of the judices of Israel, who slew his brothers...But when King Charles learned of the plot by Pippin and those who were with him, he called together an assembly of the Franks and his other fideles at Regensburg [in Bavaria], and there the whole Christian people present with the king judged that Pippin as well as those who were his accomplices in this abominable plot should lose both the estates and their lives. And this judgement was carried out with regard to some; but as regards Pippin, since the king did not wish him to be put to death, the Franks judged that he must be subjected to God's service.

— Lorsch Annals, 792

The Royal Frankish Annals provide another foundational annalistic source for the study of Pepin. Although they were probably compiled in Charlemagne's court, a later writer revised them after the emperor's death, which might impact the way in which the annals cover Pepin. Einhard, a scholar at Charlemagne's court and one of the king's most important early biographers, provides only a glancing mention of Pepin. Initially, he makes no mention of Pepin or Himilitrude in his list of Charlemagne's legitimate offspring and spouses in his Vita Karoli Magni:

...[He] married Hildegard, a woman of high birth, of Suabian origin. He had three sons by her—Charles, Pepin, and Louis—and as many daughters—Hruodrud, Bertha, and Gisela. He had three other daughters besides these—Theoderada, Hiltrud, and Ruodhaid—two by his third wife, Fastrada, a woman of East Frankish (that is to say, of German) origin, and the third by a concubine, whose name for the moment escapes me.

— Einhard, Vita Karoli Magni, 45–6

But Einhard knew that Pepin was Charlemagne's son—although he does not mention that Pepin was the first born. Only a few pages later, Einhard acknowledges Pepin's birth, saying, "By one of his concubines he had a son, handsome in face, but hunchbacked, named Pepin, whom I omitted to mention in the list of his children." Apparently Pepin was already in a sort of historical exile by the time of Einhard's writing: he is not portrayed as part of the legitimate lineage and does not enjoy the place of honor enjoyed by Charlemagne's other offspring. This is explained by Einhard's subsequent account of Pepin's revolt. Pepin feigned illness as he plotted with "certain leading Franks" to overthrow his father. When the plot was discovered, Einhard writes that Pepin was tonsured and sent directly to the monastery of Prüm. In his paper "Pipinus Rex" historian Carl Hammer points out the disparate attention Einhard gives to Pepin's revolt, arguing, "he gives it priority over his account of the evidently more widespread and possibly more dangerous rebellion of 785/6." Hammer also points out that Einhard describes Pepin as a "hapless pawn of the real conspirators" and so hopes to maintain the cohesion of the family unit in his portrayal of Charlemagne and his offspring. Hammer points out that no historian we have record of prior to Einhard called Pepin "the Hunchback"—Presumably, this slander was another aspect of Einhard's attempt to spare the family."

A third and differing account of Pepin's life comes from Notker the Stammerer, a Benedictine monk writing during the reign of Charles the Fat, the great-grandson of Charlemagne. Notker's account, referred to by modern scholars as the Gesta Caroli Magni ("The Deeds of Charles the Great") or De Carolo Magno ("Concerning Charles the Great") provides much more detail about Pepin's plot than earlier sources, although some of the story seems heavily inspired by classical sources. According to Notker, Pepin and his co-conspirators meet in the church of St. Peter in Regensburg to discuss their plot, where a cleric hiding under the altar overhears them. After the deacon reveals the conspiracy to Charlemagne, the plotters are captured, and Pepin is "cruelly scourged" and banished to a poor monastery—Notker claims that it was the monastery of St. Gall, although Pepin was almost certainly sent to the monastery of Prüm. Notker, however, adds another element to the story, possibly borrowed from the Roman historian Livy's account of Tarquin's poppies. Some time later, when faced with another revolt, Charlemagne sends messengers to Pepin to ask his advice. The king's men find Pepin weeding nestles in the garden, where he refuses to offer Charlemagne any advice, saying "I will send him no message except—what I am doing! I am digging up the useless weeds in order that the valuable vegetables may be able to develop more freely." When the messengers relate the story back to Charlemagne, he manages to "divine the real meaning of the words" and puts the rebellious nobles to death. As a reward for his good counsel, Charlemagne allows Pepin to choose "the manner of life that most pleased him" and Pepin asks to move to the monastery of Prüm.

The Poeta Saxo, an anonymous Saxon poet who composed the Annales de gestis Caroli magni imperatoris libri quinque ("Annals of the Deeds of Emperor Charlemagne in Five Books") near the end of the 9th century, relies heavily on classical models and existing sources like Einhard and the Royal Frankish Annals. Generally, he offers an interesting literary restatement of the older vitae and annals, but little new history.

== In fiction and popular culture ==
Many modern historians dismiss the historical accuracy of Notker the Stammerer's account. However, some recent scholars argue that Notker offers a valuable early literary account of Pepin. Historian David Ganz suggests in his Introduction to Notker's work that De Carolo Magno "can be seen as an attempt to provide a revision of Einhard's text, with a proper emphasis, lacking in Einhard, on Charlemagne as Christian ruler and a part of the divine plan for salvation." Professor Lewis Thorpe suggests that "the Charlemagne of the Monk of Saint Gall seems to live before our eyes and to be a little nearer to the real man whom we find portrayed elsewhere." Like his portrayal of Charlemagne, Notker's depiction of the hunchback inaugurated a long tradition of fictionalizing Pepin as a literary character, with an emphasis on the complex relationship he maintained with his father.

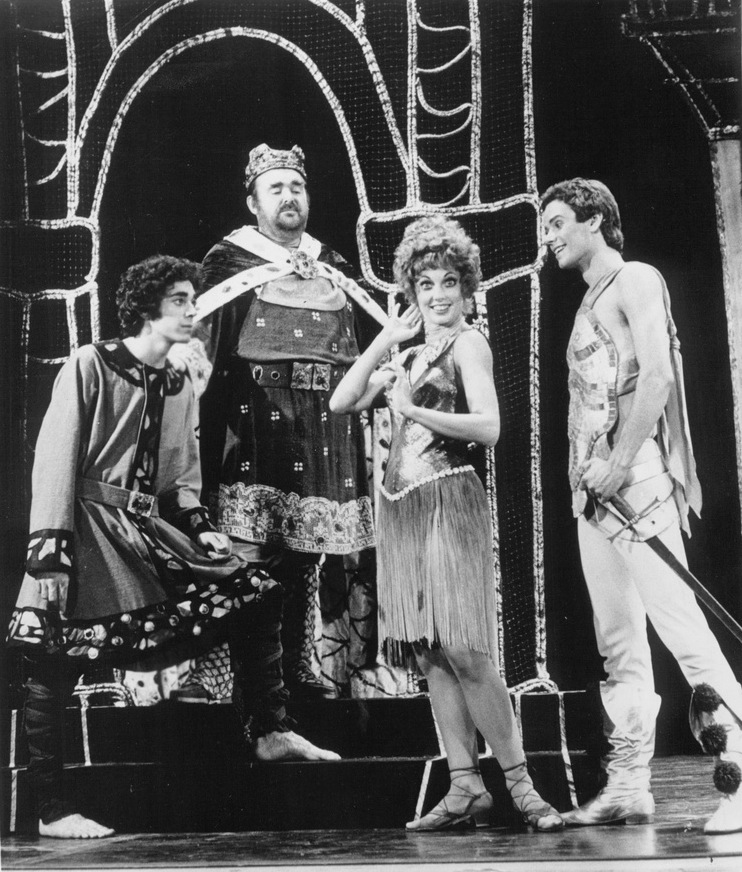
Publicity photo of American actors, (L–R) Barry Williams, I.M. Hobson, Louisa Flaningam and Adam Grammis promoting a 1975 theatrical production of Pippin.

The 1972 Broadway musical hit Pippin, by Stephen Schwartz and Roger O. Hirson, is loosely based on the Pippin the Hunchback of history. In her 1959 children's novel Son of Charlemagne, Barbara Willard tells the story of Charlemagne's family in a historical-fictional style by fleshing out the details of more historical accounts (likely, Einhard was a major source). In such scenes as Carloman's baptism, "Carl" expresses distress as he realizes that he has been renamed Pepin and takes his older half-brother's place.

The short story by Alexandre Dumas, "Episodes from Pepin et Charlemagne", has been incorrectly cited as being about Pepin the Hunchback. In fact, the story is about his namesake and grandfather, Charlemagne's father Pepin.

== Sources ==
- Airlie, Stuart. "The Aristocracy: Captains and Kings." Charlemagne: Empire and Society. Ed. Joanna Story. Manchester: Manchester UP, 2005. pp 90–101.
- Augustine, St. "Book XL." City of God. Christian Classics Ethereal Library. Web. 11 Dec. 2012.
- Barbero, Alessandro. Charlemagne: Father of a Continent. Berkeley: University of California, 2004. pp 133, 134, 136, 137, 149, 341.
- Becher, Matthias. Charlemagne. New Haven: Yale UP, 2003. pp 121, 123, 127.
- Capitularia Regum Francorum. Hannoverae: Impensis Bibliopolii Hahniani, 1881–97. Entry 23.
- Dumas, Alexander. "Episodes from Pépin et Charlemagne". Selected and edited, with notes, by J. D. Whyte. London, Rivingtons, 1889.
- Einhard, and Notker The Stammerer. Two Lives of Charlemagne. Trans. David Ganz. N.p.: Penguin, 2008. pp 33, 45, 46, 48, 49, 51, 101, 102, 103
- Goffart, Walter. "Paul the Deacon's 'Gesta Episcoporum Mettensium' and the Early Design of Charlemagne's Succession." Traditio 42 (1986): 59–93. doi:10.1017/S0362152900004049. JSTOR 27831181.
- Hammer, Carl I. "'Pipinus Rex': Pippin's Plot of 792 and Bavaria." Traditio 63 (2008): 235–76. doi:10.1353/trd.2008.0005. JSTOR 27832082.
- Hodgkin, Thomas. The Life of Charlemagne (Charles the Great). [Whitefish, MT]: Kessinger Pub., 2006. pp 130, 139, 140
- King, P. D. "Lorsch Annals." Charlemagne: Translated Sources. Lambrigg, Kendal, Cumbria: P.D. King, 1987. pp 137–45.
- McKinney, Mary E., trans. The Saxon Poet's Life of Charles the Great. New York: Pageant, 1956. pp 7, 26.
- McKitterick, Rosamond. Charlemagne: The Formation of a European Identity. Cambridge: Cambridge UP, 2008. p 84.
- Nelson, Janet L. (2002) "Charlemagne – pater optimus?" Am Vorabend der Kaiserkrönung: Originally published 2002. pp 76, 269–282.
- Ohnacker, Elke. "'What If... Charlemagne's Other Sons had survived?' Charlemagne's Sons and the Problems of Royal Succession." Historical Social Research/Historische Sozialforschung 34(2) (2009): pp 184–202. doi:10.12759/hsr.34.2009.2.184-202. JSTOR 20762362.
- "Pippin Synopsis." Musicals Dot Net. Web.
- Riché, Pierre. The Carolingians: A Family Who Forged Europe. Trans. Michael I. Allen. Philadelphia: University of Pennsylvania, 1993. p 135
- Scholz, Bernhard Walter, Barbara Rogers, and Nithard. Carolingian Chronicles: Royal Frankish Annals and Nithard's Histories. Ann Arbor: University of Michigan, 1972. pp 6–8, 58–64.
- Simek, Rudolf. Heaven and Earth in the Middle Ages: The Physical World before Columbus. Woodbridge, Suffolk: Boydell, 1996. p 91.
- Willard, Barbara, and Emil Weiss. Son of Charlemagne. Bethlehem Books, 1998. pp 12, 34.
- Winston, Richard. Charlemagne: From the Hammer to the Cross. Indianapolis, Indiana: Bobbs-Merrill, 1954. pp 41, 211.
