= Louis (abbot of Saint-Denis) =

Abbot, grandson of Charlemagne (c. 800–867)

Louis (c. 800 – 867), a Frankish churchman and a member of the Carolingian royal family, was the Abbot of Saint-Denis from 841.

Born around 800, Louis was the illegitimate son of Rotrude, daughter of Charlemagne, by Count Rorgon I of Maine. He was probably raised at the court of his grandfather, Charlemagne, until the latter's death in 814. From 835, he served his uncle, the Emperor Louis the Pious, Charlemagne's successor, as archchancellor. On Louis's death in June 840, he declared his allegiance to Charles the Bald and became his archchancellor. In September or October 840, Abbot Hilduin of Saint-Denis defected from Charles to Lothair I. Charles promised Louis, already a monk of Saint-Denis, that when the abbacy was back in his control he would bestow it on Louis.

On 14 June 844, Richbod and Nithard, abbot and lay abbot respectively of Saint-Riquier, died in battle. Charles appointed Louis abbot of Saint-Riquier with Charles's uncle Rudolf as his lay counterpart.

In 857, some Vikings from Jeufosse raided Saint-Denis and captured Louis. His half-brother, Gauzlin, the bishop of Paris, was also captured. Charles had to raise a large ransom, including a contribution of 688 lb of gold and 3250 lb of silver from Saint-Denis, to liberate the captives.

Louis held the position of archchancellor until his death. He died in 867. On his death Charles named himself lay abbot and took direct control of the abbey.

== Sources ==
- McKitterick, Rosamond (2008). Charlemagne: The Formation of a European Identity. Cambridge University Press.
- Nelson, J. L. (1992). Charles the Bald. London: Longman.
