= Hildegard (queen) =

Queen of the Franks from 771 to 783

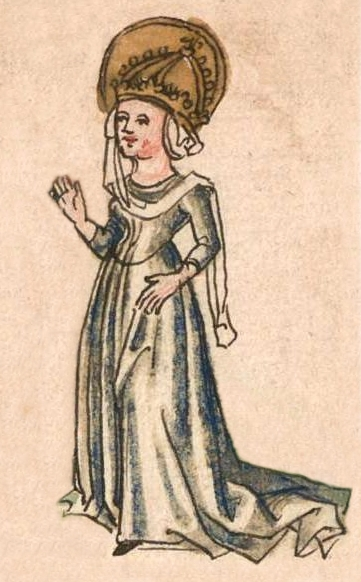
- Anachronistic illustration of Hildegard from about 1499

Queen consort of the Franks
- Tenure: c. 771 – 30 April 783
- Successor: Fastrada

Queen consort of the Lombards
- Tenure: June 774 – 30 April 783
- Predecessor: Ansa
- Successor: Fastrada
- Born: c. 757/758
- Died: 30 April 783; Thionville
- Burial: Abbey of Saint-Arnould, Metz
- Spouse: Charlemagne (m. c. 771)
- Issue: Charles the Younger; Pepin of Italy; Adalhaid; Rotrude; Louis the Pious; Lothair; Bertha; Gisela; Hildegard
- House: Udalrichings
- Father: Gerold of Anglachgau
- Mother: Imma of Alemannia

Hildegard (c. 757/758 – 30 April 783) was a Frankish queen and the wife of Charlemagne from c. 771 until her death. Hildegard was a noblewoman of Frankish and Alemannian heritage. Through eleven years of marriage with Charlemagne, Hildegard helped share in his rule as well as having nine children with him, including the kings Charles the Younger and Pepin of Italy and the emperor Louis the Pious.

== Life ==
Hildegard was the daughter of the Frankish count Gerold and his wife, the Alemannian noblewoman Imma. Thegan of Trier, a ninth-century biographer of Hildegard's son Louis emphasizes her Alemannian heritage and descent from duke Gotfrid through her mother, indicating that Imma was of higher status than Gerold. Hildegard was likely born in 757 or 758.

Gerold held lands in the vicinity of the Middle Rhine under the Frankish king Carloman I. Carloman died on 4 December 771 and his brother king Charlemagne sought to bring Carloman's lands under his rule. Charlemagne arranged to marry Hildegard and gain Gerold's support. Hildegard married Charlemagne shortly after Carloman's death, certainly before 30 April 772. She was thirteen or fourteen years old at the time of the marriage. By marrying Hildegard, Charlemagne ended his marriage to a daughter of the Lombard king Desiderius. Charlemagne had also had a previous relationship (perhaps a marriage) with the Frankish noblewoman Himiltrude, and had a son with her named Pepin. As queen, Hildegard would have been responsible for administering the royal household and estates. She also joined her husband as the co-signer of charters, including grants of patronage to monasteries.

Charlemagne took Hildegard to the Frankish royal palace at Thionville, where they stayed for two months before he set off on a campaign in Saxony. At the end of the campaigning season, Charlemagne returned to Thionville, and during this period the couple's son Charles was born. At Thionville, Charlemagne received an emissary from Pope Adrian I who was seeking his help against Desiderius. Charlemagne, heeding the Pope's call for aid, invaded Lombardy in late 773 and besieged the Lombard capital of Pavia. In early 774, Charlemagne sent for Hildegard to travel to the Frankish camp at Pavia with Peppin and Charles. Hildegard was heavily pregnant, and gave birth to a daughter named Adelhaid during the siege. They sent the baby back north to Francia for safety, but she died on the way. By June, Charlemagne conquered the city, deposed Desiderius and his wife Ansa, and named himself king of the Lombards. Charlemagne and Hildegard likely went through a ritual installation as the new king and queen in Pavia (though no direct source exists), and a charter issued in Lombardy in July was a grant of Lombard land to the Abbey of St. Martin made in both of their names.

The royal family returned to Francia later in the summer of 774. The next year, as Charlemagne campaigned in Saxony, Hildegard gave birth to their daughter Rotrude. Their next child was Carloman, born in 777. In 778, Hildegard traveled with Charlemagne to Chasseneuil-du-Poitou, where he was amassing his army for a campaign in Spain. Hildegard was pregnant when they arrived, and gave birth to twin boys, Louis and Lothair, while Charlemagne was on campaign. Lothair died in 780 at the age of two, the same year Hildegard gave birth to another daughter, Bertha.

In 781, Charlemagne and Hildegard traveled to Rome with Louis, Carloman, and their daughters at Pope Adrian's request. Carloman was four years old, but his parents had delayed his baptism so that the Pope could perform it. Carloman was baptized, and Adrian then crowned him as king of the Lombards (later styled king of Italy) and Louis as king of Aquitaine. As part of Carloman's baptism, he was renamed Pepin, now sharing a name with his half-brother. The two new kings, still young children, were sent to their new kingdoms to be raised by regents and advisors in their own courts. On this trip to Italy, Hildegard also gave birth to her third daughter, Gisela, and she was baptized in Milan. Around this time, Hildegard and Charlemagne jointly commissioned the Godescalc Evangelistary, a surviving illuminated manuscript of the Gospels and exemplary piece of Carolingian Renaissance art.

Hildegard had her final pregnancy in 782–783, and she and Charlemagne stayed in the palace at Thionville during that winter. Hildegard gave birth to another daughter in late April, but died shortly after on 30 April 783, possibly due to complications from the birth. The baby was named in her mother's honor, but also died less than two months later. Hildegard was buried at the Abbey of Saint-Arnould at Metz, and Charlemagne arranged for her tomb to be perpetually lit and for daily Masses to be said there, as well as commissioning an epitaph in her honor from his courtier Paul the Deacon.

== Children ==
In her marriage to Charlemagne, Hildegard had nine children:

- Charles the Younger (c. 772/773–811), Duke of Maine and king under Charlemagne
- Adalhaid (773/4–774), born while her parents were on campaign in Italy. She was sent back to Francia, but died before reaching Lyons.
- Rotrude (or Hruodrud) (c. 775–810)
- Carloman, renamed Pepin (777–810), King of Italy
- Louis (778–840), King of Aquitaine and Emperor
- Lothair (778–779/780), twin of Louis, he died in infancy
- Bertha (779/780–826)
- Gisela (b. 782)
- Hildegard (782–783)

Louis and Pepin both married and had children. Rotrude had been betrothed to Emperor Constantine VI, but this betrothal was ended. None of Hildegard's daughters married, though several had children with unmarried partners: Bertha had two sons, Nithard and Hartnid with Charlemagne's courtier Angilbert; and Rotrude had a son named Louis possibly with Count Rorgon.

== See also ==
- Princely Abbey of Kempten – financially and politically supported by Hildegard

Royal titles
Preceded by Desiderata and Gerberge	Queen of the Franks c. 771–783	Succeeded by Fastrada
