= Jean Jouffroy =

French prelate and diplomat

- Cardinal
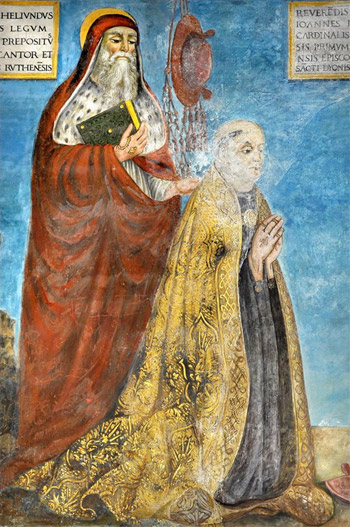
- Portrait of Jean Jouffroy in Albi Cathedral (1510)
- Appointed: 1461
- Previous posts: Abbot of Luxeuil (1451?); Bishop of Arras (1453); Papal legate (1459); Bishop of Albi (1462); Abbot of Saint-Denis (1464)

Personal details
- Born: c. 1412 Luxeuil-les-Bains, County of Burgundy
- Died: 1473 Reuilly, France

Jean Jouffroy (c. 1412–1473) was a Burgundian prelate and diplomat.

He was born at Luxeuil-les-Bains in the County of Burgundy. After entering the Benedictine order and teaching at the university of Pavia from 1435 to 1438, he became almoner to Philip the Good, duke of Burgundy, who entrusted him with diplomatic missions in France, Italy, Portugal and Castile. Jouffroy was appointed abbot of Luxeuil (1451?), bishop of Arras (1453), and papal legate (1459).

At the French court his diplomatic duties brought him to the notice of the Dauphin, the future Louis XI. Jouffroy entered Louis's service, and obtained a cardinal's hat (1461), the bishopric of Albi (1462), and the abbacy of St Denis (1464). There was resistance from other cardinals to his being given a red hat by Pope Pius II, but the pope insisted. On several occasions he was sent to Rome to negotiate the abolition of the Pragmatic Sanction and to defend the interests of the Angevins at Naples. Attached by King Louis to the sieur de Beaujeu in the expedition against John V, Count of Armagnac, Jouffroy was accused of taking the town of Lectoure by treachery, and of being a party to the murder of the count of Armagnac (1473). He died at Reuilly the same year.
