= Gisela (daughter of Charlemagne) =

8th and 9th-century Frankish noblewoman

- Born: in or before 781
- Died: after 808
- Dynasty: Carolingian
- Father: Charlemagne
- Mother: Hildegard

Gisela, (in or before 781 – 808 or later) was a daughter of Charlemagne from his marriage to Hildegard.

She was baptized at the Basilica of Sant'Ambrogio in 781 by Thomas, Archbishop of Milan. She was educated at the castle in Aachen, with Alcuin who gave her the nickname "Delia". According to Alcuin she took a particular interest in astronomy. Alcuin refers to "Delia" in some of his poetry.

Like her sisters Bertha and Rotrude, Gisela never married.

Sources vary regarding her later life, some sources state 808 as a death date, others state that in 814 she was sent to a convent by her brother Louis the Pious. The sisters of Louis were sent from the capital to estates from their father's will or ones deemed appropriate.
