= Hilduin of Saint-Denis =

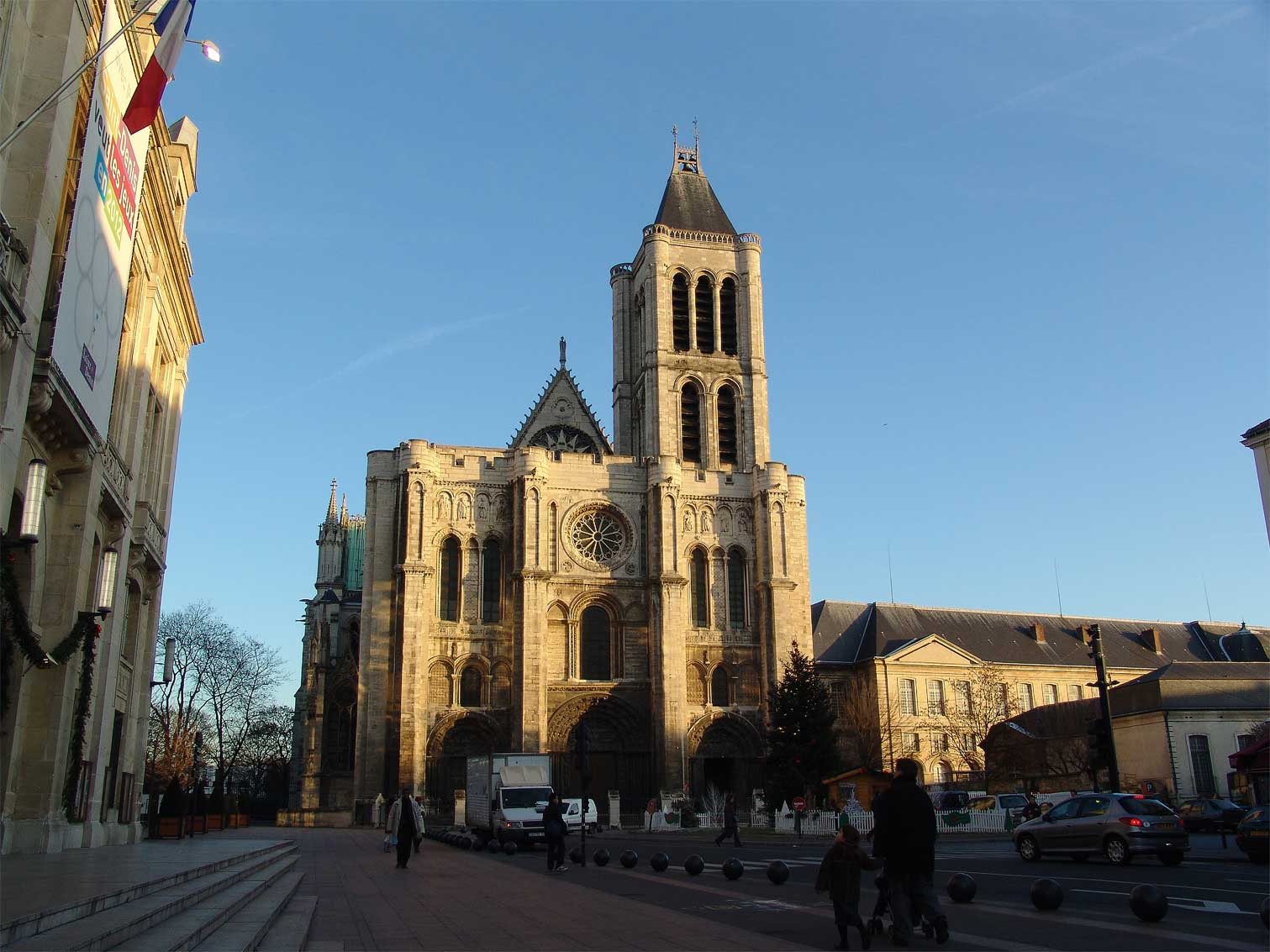
West facade of Saint-Denis cathedral

Hilduin (c. 785 – c. 855) was Bishop of Paris, chaplain to Louis I, reforming Abbot of the Abbey of Saint-Denis, and author. He was one of the leading scholars and administrators of the Carolingian Empire.

== Background ==
Hilduin was from a prominent Frankish family. Michael Lapidge suggests that he was the nephew of Queen Hildegard, and first cousin to Louis the Pious. This would account for his appointment to the prestigious Abbey of Saint-Denis, the burial site of the Frankish kings. Johann Peter Kirsch says Hilduin was educated at the palace school under Alcuin, As Alcuin was in Northumbria in 790, Lapidge suggests Waldo of Reichenau as a possible alternative. Waldo was abbot of Reichenau, to which Hilduin's family had ties. In 806 Waldo became abbot of Saint-Denis, near Paris. In either case, Hilduin acquired a good deal of erudition, and corresponded with Rabanus Maurus.

== Career ==
Waldo of Reichenau died in March 814, and Hilduin, although a secular cleric and not a monk, succeeded him as abbot of Saint-Denis. To this was later added the Abbey of St-Germain des Prés, Abbey of St-Médard in Soissons, and the Abbey of St-Ouen. In July 818, Louis the Pious stopped at St-Denis on his way to military campaign in Brittany. Hilduin then accompanied him. Hincmar of Reims, who speaks of Hilduin with great respect, was one his students at the school of Saint-Denis. Dungal of Bobbio and possibly Otfrid of Weissenburg served under him. "Hilduin was concerned with the accurate production of manuscripts", and oversaw the scriptorium at Saint-Denis. The Abbey had a substantial library.

Upon the death of Hildebold of Cologne in September 818, Louis the Pious appointed Hilduin as his archchaplain in 819, or, more probably, not until 822. He was one of the King's valued counselors, and became both wealthy, and influential regarding royal patronage. He was instrumental in the appointment of Walafrid Strabo of Reichenau as tutor to Louis's son Charles the Bald.

In the war between Emperor Louis and his sons (830) Hilduin took the side of the latter. Thereby he lost his abbeys and was banished, first to Paderborn and then to the Abbey of Corvey (near Höxter on the Weser). Abbot Warin of that monastery received him kindly, in return for which Hilduin presented him with the relics of St. Vitus, which thereafter were profoundly venerated in Corvey. No later than 831, however, Hilduin regained Louis's favour. By 832 he was reinstated in the Abbey of Saint-Denis, whereupon he apparently withdrew from politics and successfully undertook a reform of that monastery according to the Benedictine rule. When the King's sons again rebelled the following year, Louis and his young son Charles were brought from Soissons and held at Saint-Denis for a few weeks. The King was restored to power at Saint-Denis in March 834.

Upon the death of Louis the Pious in 840, Hilduin supported the King's eldest son Lothair I against his brothers Louis the German and Charles the Bald. With the division of the kingdom pursuant to the Treaty of Verdun in 843, Saint-Denis fell in the territory of Charles. Hilduin resigned as abbot, and Lothar appointed him to the archbishopric of Cologne, but he was never consecrated as archbishop. When not residing in Cologne, he frequently served as ambassador from Lotharingia to Constantinople.

== Works ==
In 835, Louis commissioned Hilduin to write a biography of St. Dionysius of Paris, the emperor's patron saint. Hilduin executed this commission, with the aid of the pseudo-Dionysius's writings, a copy of which had been sent to the Frankish court by the Byzantine Emperor Michael II, and of other authorities. In his "Vita" Hilduin identified Dionysius of Paris with the Areopagite Dionysius, a view not generally accepted at that time, but which Hilduin's biography popularized for several centuries, until Sismondi and others dispelled this error. Hilduin also helped to complete the Carolingian "Reichsannalen", or imperial annals.

In 1940, Max Buchner identified Hilduin as the author usually referred to as "The Astronomer," the author of the Vita Hludovici, a biography of Louis. This theory has achieved some popularity amongst later scholars, notably Ernst Tremp in 1995.

== Bibliography ==
- Calmette, J. (1904). "Les Abbés Hilduin au IXe Siècle". Bibliothèque de l'École des Chartes (in French). 65: 530–536. doi:10.3406/bec.1904.448212.
- Dümmler, Ernest (1862). Geschichte des Ostfränkischen Reiches (in German). Duncker & Humblot.
- Ebert, Adolf (1874). Allgemeine Geschichte der Literatur des Mittelalters im Abendlande (in German). Akademische Druck.
- Foss, R. (1886). Ueber den Abt Hilduin von St. Denis und Dionysius Areopagita (in German).
- Monod, G. (1896). Hilduin et les Annales Einhardi (in French). Paris: Mélanges Julien Havet.
- Wattenbach, Wilhelm (1885). Deutschlands Geschichtsquellen im Mittelalter bis zur Mitte des Dreizehnten Jahrhunderts (in German). Berlin: W. Hertz.
