= Abbey of Saint-Arnould =

Benedictine abbey in Metz, France

Coordinates: 49.1180°N 6.1715°E

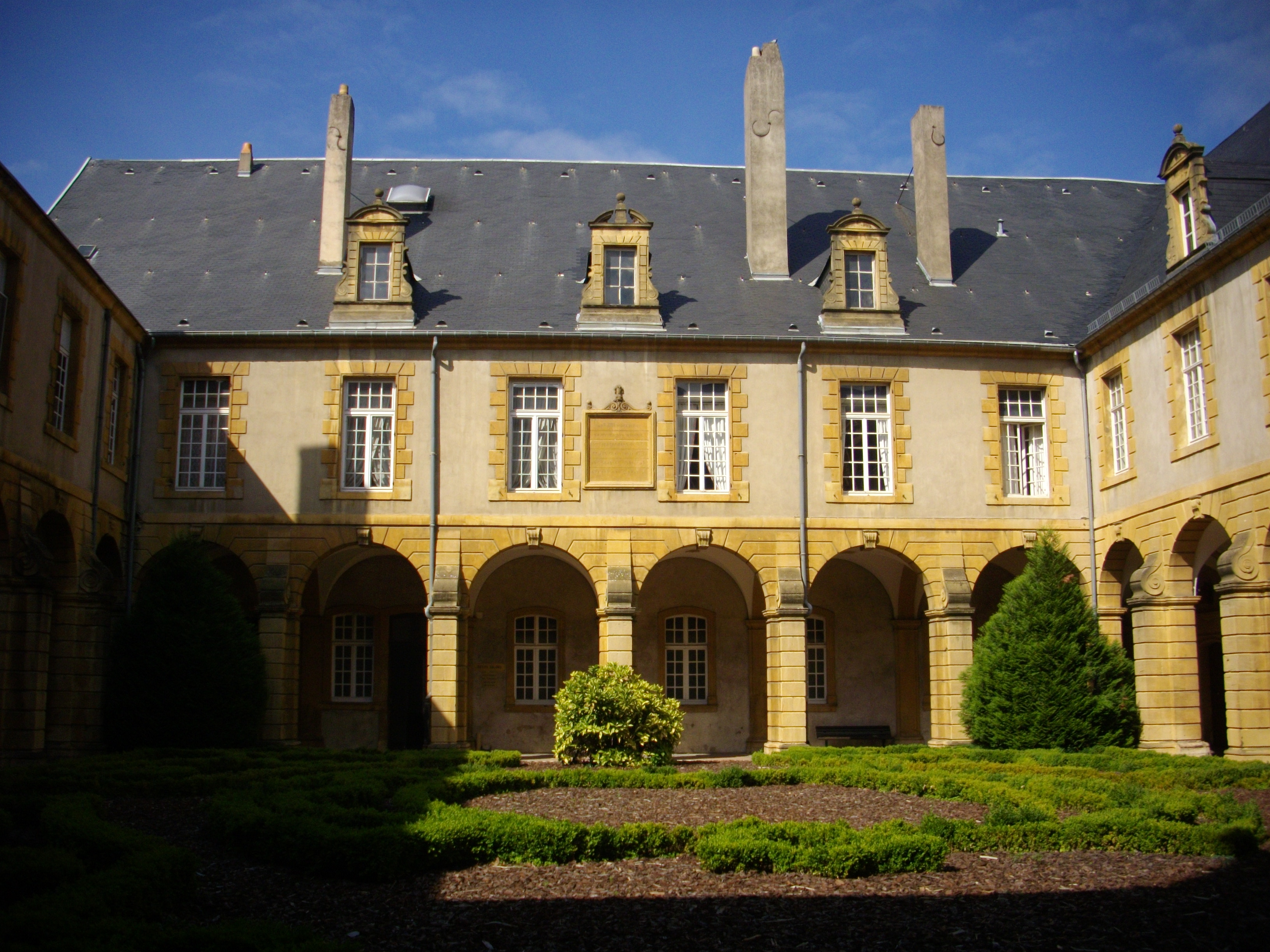
Abbey of Saint-Arnould

The Abbey of Saint-Arnould, St. Arnold, Saint-Arnoult or Abbey of the Holy Apostles is a Benedictine abbey residing in Metz since the 6th century.

The origins of the abbey are a mystery. According to legend, it was founded in the 2nd century by Bishop Patient Metz as the Basilica of St. John Evangelist. Although no historical record exists before the 6th century, it was named the Church of the Holy Apostles in 715. It stood in front of medieval ramparts of the Hôpital Notre Dame de Bon Secours, near the Roman road leading to Toul and Lyon.

According to another source, this was the site of the Church of St. Theresa of the Child Jesus, which stood in front of the hospital.

In 717, the Abbey took the name of St. Arnulf, due to the relics of Arnulf of Metz, Bishop of Metz, having been interred there in 641.

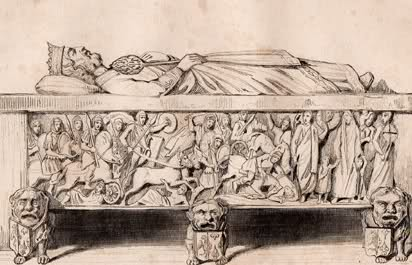
The largely destroyed coffin of Emperor Louis the Pious

Charlemagne made this abbey the burial place of his family: his wife Hildegarde, sisters, son, Emperor Louis the Pious, and Bishop Drogo were all buried here.

It was destroyed by the Normans in the 9th century when they plundered Metz. However, the abbey was rebuilt in the same location and, in 1049, saw the consecration of a more grandiose church, which suffered a fire in 1097.

In 942, Bishop Adalberon moved the monks from Abbey Gorze to Saint Arnould, under the direction of the abbot Heribert, to establish a Benedictine Abbey. From 996-997, Bishop Adalberon II entrusted William of Volpiano, as abbot, to continue this reform. Around the year 1000, the abbot appointed Guillaume Benoit, who had been his student at the Cathedral Benign Dijon. After William's death in 1015, Benoit himself became the abbot of St. Arnould.

In the 9th century, relics of St. Gorgon, a 4th-century Roman martyr, were transferred to the abbey.

The siege of Metz by Charles V in 1552 led to the destruction of the abbey. The abbey was transferred to inside the walls of the Dominican convent of preachers, built in 1221. The church was rebuilt in the 17th century. These buildings can be seen today, in particular the cloister, the refectory, and the former sacristy.

The Diocese of Metz, where the Abbey is located, was part of the province of Trier until 1780. It was transferred to the province of Besançon from 1801.

During the French Revolution, the Abbey was confiscated as property of the state, the monks were expelled, and the imperial tombs were destroyed. Part of the tomb of Louis the Pious is conserved in the museum of Metz. After the Revolution, vineyards were planted on part of the site of the abbey.

The Abbey of Saint-Arnould has a Pietà carved around 1520. It was "walled up" above one of the entrances to the chapel of the abbey during the Reign of Terror (1793-1794), following an edict from the mayor of Metz ordering all religious images to be hidden from public view; but it was rediscovered in 1990 during construction work (the site of the chapel is the current tennis court behind the Governor's Palace). Dated around the 10th century, it is one of the most beautiful polychrome Pietà known in the world (according to the experts participating in the symposium organized by the Renaissance old Metz in association with the Ministry of Defence and the land area of the COMMAND North East: 11 May 2007).

During the French Revolution, an artillery and engineering school moved into the monastery buildings. Later, a 42 m high turret was constructed during the Second French Empire, to observe the maneuvers of artillery on Mont Saint-Quentin. During the German occupation in 1872, the artillery school gave way to the "Kriegsschule Metz", a German military school. In April 1919, the abbey became the headquarters of the "Cercle des Officers" of Metz
