= Carmen de conversione Saxonum =

Latin poem

The Carmen de conversione Saxonum—or in English, Poem Concerning the Conversion of the Saxons—is a Latin poem celebrating the conversion of the Saxons to Christianity in 777. It was written by a poet of the Frankish Kingdom for or shortly after the assembly held by Charlemagne at Paderborn in Saxony in that year. This marked the end of the first phase of the Saxon Wars and was believed at the time, as shown by the Carmen and other contemporary sources, to mark the full acceptance by the Saxons of their defeat and conversion. The following year, however, the Saxons rebelled and the wars continued for several decades.

The Carmen is strictly anonymous, but modern scholars have proposed several attributions. Frobenius Forster thought it was the work of Alcuin. Karl Hauck argued that it was written by Lullus, an attribution accepted by Donald Bullough and James Palmer. Dieter Schaller argues for Paulinus of Aquileia on the basis of internal linguistic evidence and is followed by Robert Flierman. The traditional attribution is to Angilbert, a confidante of the king, as in Ernst Dümmler's edition. More recently, it has been argued for by Susan Rabe and accepted by Bernard Bachrach.

The Carmen consists of 75 hexameters divided into three sections. It is a "virtual panegyric" of Charlemagne. Over half of the poem is a celebration of his initiatives, especially his military victories. Charlemagne and God are the only protagonists in its account. Some of its imagery is derived from Virgil's Aeneid, as when Hell is described as the "sand of Cocytus" or "jaws of Celydrus", but mostly from the Bible. There are also allusions to Eclogue 4 and possible borrowings from Aldhelm.

The Carmen had little literary impact, since its celebratory tone was overtaken by events within a year. The only later medieval author to evince any awareness of it is Hrotsvith of Gandersheim. It now survives in a single 9th-century manuscript, number 308 (formerly 2883) in the library of the Schönborn family's Weissenstein Castle in Pommersfelden. The first edition, published in 1777 by Forster, was based on a different manuscript now lost. Rabe has translated the poem into English.

== Excerpts ==
The poet supplies the date:

Now about seven hundred completed years
And seven times ten, unless I err, besides seven left over,
As the calculator index of the ancients hands down
Are present by the flowing away of the time of the present year
And in that year Charles is reigning happily for his ninth ...

A description of the paganism of the Saxons:

A nation which long ago was placing filthy gifts at polluted temples
Consumed with quick flames, pyre-like;
Duly was slaughtering bulls at bloodied altars,
And, by suppliantly bending necks, venerating the abominable cults
Of demons, and princes, gods, penates;

The celebration of Charlemagne's triumph:

This [Saxon] nation Charles the prince, bravely girded
With shining arms, crested with pointed helmets,
Helped by the wonderful strength of the eternal judge,
He tamed through different destructions, through a thousand triumphs;
And through blood-bearing shields, through spears of war,
Through the strength of virtues, through javelins smeared with gore
He crushed down and subjected it to himself with a shimmering sword.
He dragged the forest-worshipping legions into the kingdom of heaven ...

== Bibliography ==
- Bachrach, Bernard S. (2013). Charlemagne's Early Campaigns (768–777): A Diplomatic and Military Analysis. Brill.
- Bullough, Donald A. (1985). "Aula Renovata: The Carolingian Court Before the Aachen Palace". Proceedings of the British Academy. 71: 267–301.
- Dümmler, Ernst, ed. (1881). "Carmen de conversione Saxonum". Monumenta Germaniae Historica, Poetae Latini Aevi Carolini. Vol. I. Weidmann. pp. 380–381.
- Flierman, Robert (2017). Saxon Identities, AD 150–900. Bloomsbury.
- Hauck, Karl (1985). Karolingische Taufpfalzen im Spiegel hofnäher Dichtung: Überlegungen zur Ausmalung von Pfalzkirchen, Pfalzen und Reichsklöstern. Göttingen.
- Palmer, James (2005). "The 'Vigorous Rule' of Bishop Lull: Between Bonifatian Mission and Carolingian Church Control". Early Medieval Europe. 13 (3): 249–276. doi:10.1111/j.1468-0254.2005.00158.x. S2CID 154456556.
- Rabe, Susan A. (1995). Faith, Art, and Politics at Saint-Riquier: The Symbolic Vision of Angilbert. University of Pennsylvania Press. ISBN 9780812232080.
- Rembold, Ingrid (2018). Conquest and Christianization: Saxony and the Carolingian World, 772–888. Cambridge University Press.
- Schaller, Dieter (1989). "Der Dichter des 'Carmen de conversione Saxonum'". In F. Brunhölzl; G. Bernt; F. Rädle; G. Silagi (eds.). Tradition und Wertung: Festschrift für Franz Brunhölzl zum 65. Geburtstag. Thorbecke. pp. 27–46.
- Worstbrock, Franz Josef (2012) [2004]. "De conversione Saxonum". In Kurt Ruh; Gundolf Keil; Werner Schröder; Burghart Wachinger; Franz Josef Worstbrock; Christine Stöllinger (eds.). Verfasserlexikon: Die deutsche Literatur des Mittelalters. Vol. 2: Comitis, Gerhard–Gerstenberg, Wigand. De Gruyter. p. 336.
