= Rully, Oise =

Rully
- Commune
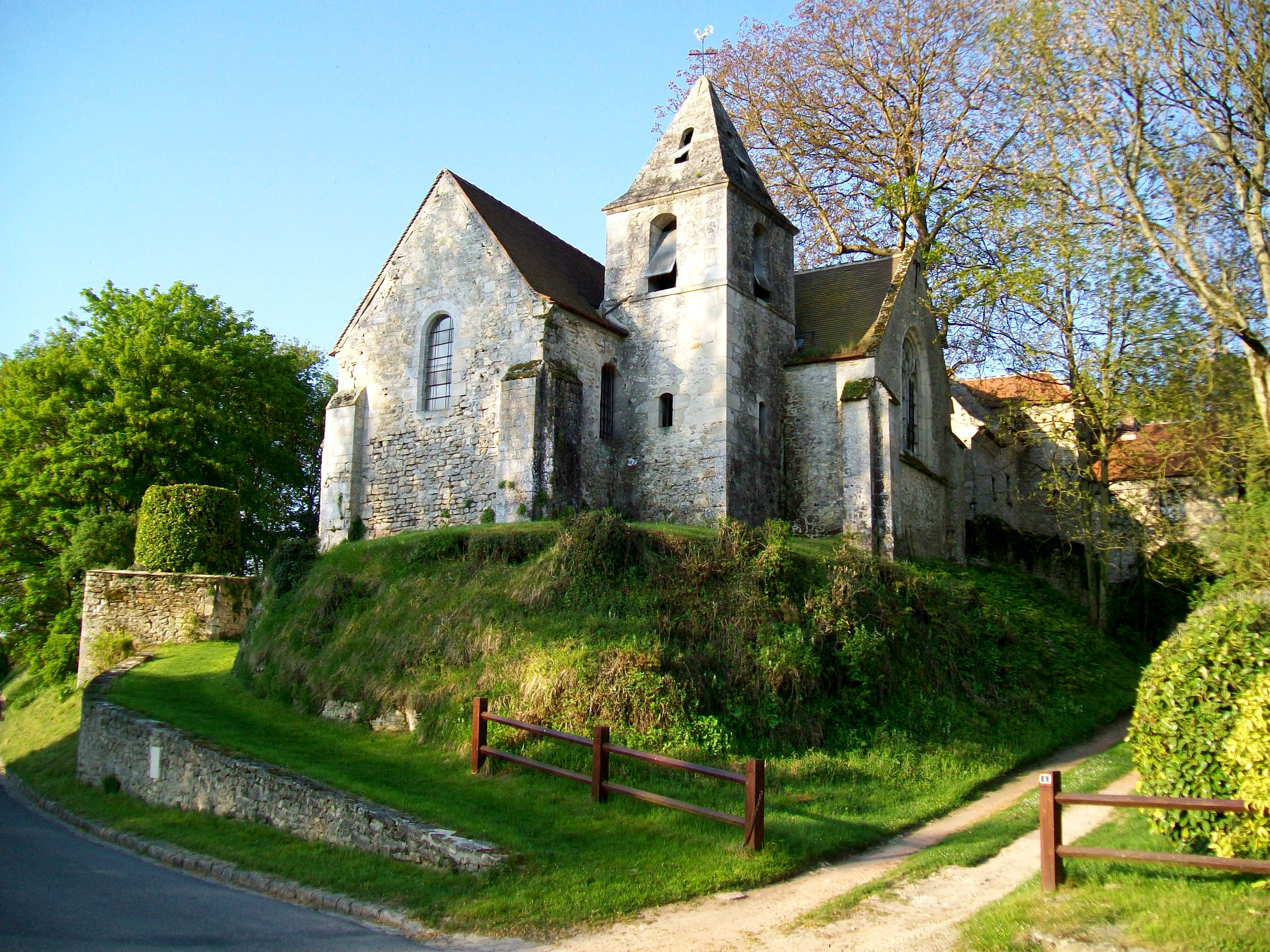
- The church of Bray, in Rully
- Location of Rully
- Location within France Location within Hauts-de-France
- Coordinates: 49°14′09″N 2°43′43″E
- Country: France
- Region: Hauts-de-France
- Department: Oise
- Arrondissement: Senlis
- Canton: Pont-Sainte-Maxence

Government
  - Mayor (2020–2026): Viviane Tondellier
- Area^{1}: 15.45 km^{2} (5.97 sq mi)
- Elevation: 88 m (289 ft)
- Highest elevation: 147 m (482 ft)
- Lowest elevation: 72 m (236 ft)
- Population (2023): 757
  - Density: 49.0/km^{2} (127/sq mi)
- Time zone: UTC+01:00 (CET)
  - Summer (DST): UTC+02:00 (CEST)
- INSEE/Postal code: 60560 /60810
- ^{1} French Land Register data, which excludes lakes, ponds, glaciers > 1 km^{2} (0.386 sq mi or 247 acres) and river estuaries.

Rully (French pronunciation: [ʁyli]) is a commune in the Oise department in northern France.

== See also ==
- Communes of the Oise department
