= List of abbots of Saint-Denis =

This is a list of abbots and grand priors of the Basilica of Saint-Denis.

This list is drawn mostly from Félicie d'Ayzac, Histoire de Saint-Denys (Paris, 1861), Vol. 1, pp. cxxiii–cxxxi.

== Abbots ==
For the first part of this list, dates may indicate attestations and not dates of reign.

- Dodo: 627
- Chunuald: 632 (Note: Mentioned in a charter of Dagobert I.)
- Aigulf: before 639 (Note: Pseudo-Fredegar places him in the reign of Dagobert I.)
- Wandebercht: 647 (Note: Mentioned in a charter of Chlothar III.)
- Charderic: 678×690 (Note: Mentioned in a charter that can be placed between 678 and 698.)
- Chaino: 690–696
- Dalphinus: 709/710
- Chillardus: 710–716
- Turnoald: 717 (Note: Described with the title of custos of Saint-Denis.)
- Hugh I: 718–730
- Berthoald: 723 (Note: He is mentioned only in a forged document.)
- Godobald: 726
- Amalbert: 749 (Note: The necrology of Saint-Denis dates his death 6 June 749.)
- Fulrad: 750–784
- Maginarius: 789–793
- Fardulf: 793–806
- Waldo of Reichenau: 806–814
- Hilduin († 841): 814–841
- Louis: 841–867
- Charles the Bald: 867–877 (in commendam)
- Gozlin I: 877–886
- Ebles: 886–903 (in commendam) son of Ranulf I of Aquitaine
- Robert I: 903–923 (in commendam)
- Hugh II: 923–956 (in commendam)
- Hugh III: 956–??? (in commendam)
- Gozlin II (Note: Mentioned in a charter of Richard I of Normandy.)
- Gerard
- Robert II: 980 (Note: Mentioned in a charter of Otto III.)
- Odilo: 994
- Vivian: 998
- Hugh IV: 1049–1062
- Raynier: 1067
- William I: 1071
- Yves I: 1091

For the remainder of the list dates are regnal dates.

- Adam: 1094/1099–1122
- Suger: 1122–1151
- Odo II of Deuil: 1151–1162
- Odo III of Taverny: 1162–1169
- Yves II: 1169–1173
- William II of Gap: 1173–1180, dismissed by the king
- Hugh V Foucaut: 1186–1197
- Hugh VI of Milan: 1197–1204
- Henry I Troon: 1204–1221
- Pierre d'Auteuil: 1221–1229
- Odo IV: 1228–1245
- William III: 1246–1253
- Henry II Mallet: 1254–1258, resigned
- Matthew of Vendôme: 1258–1286
- Renaud de Giffard: 1286–1304
- Gilles I de Pontoise: 1304–1325
- Guy I de Châtres: 1326–1343, resigned
- Gilles II Rigaud: 1343–1351
- Gauthier II de Pontoise: 1351–1354
- Robert III de Fontenay: 1354–1363
- Guy de Monceau: 1363–1393
- Philippe I de Vilette: 1393–1418
- Jean I de Borbon: 1418–1431
- Guillaume IV Farréchal: 1431–1442
- Philippe II de Gamaches: 1442–1464
- Jean II Jouffroy: 1464–1474
- Jean III de Villiers: 1474–1499
- Antoine de la Haye: 1499–1505
- Pierre II de Gouffier: 1505–1517
- Aymar Gouffier de Boisy: 1517–1519
- Jean d'Orimont: 1519–1529
- Louis II de Bourbon-Vendôme: 1529–1557 (in commendam)
- Charles, Cardinal of Lorraine: 1557–1574
- Louis III de Lorraine: 1574–1589
- Charles III: 1589–1594
- Louis IV de Lorraine: 1594–1622
- Henri III de Lorraine: 1622–1642
- Armand de Bourbon-Conti: 1642–1654
- Jules Cardinal Mazarin: 1654-1661
- Jean-François Paul de Gondi: 1662-1679

== Grand priors ==
In 1691, Louis XIV suppressed the title of abbot and subsequent superiors bear the title of grand prior. Its revenues were given to the Maison royale de Saint-Louis.

- Charles le Bouyer: 1691
- Julien Raguideau: 1693
- Pierre Arnould de Loo: 1696
- Mathieu Gilbert: 1702
- Charles Petey de l'Hostellerie: 1705
- Pierre Arnould de Loo: 1708
- Denys de Sainte Marthe: 1711
- Robert Marchand: 1714
- Denys de Sainte Marthe: 1717
- François Anseaume: 1720
- Pierre Richer: 1723
- Pierre du Biez: 1729
- Joseph Castel: 1736
- Pierre du Biez: 1741 (par commission)
- Joseph Avril: 1741
- Pierre Boucher: 1748
- Jacques Nicolas Chrestien: 1751
- Pierre Boucher: 1760
- Jacques Nicolas Chrestien: 1763 (elected at Marmoutiers)
- Joseph Delrue: 1766
- René Gillot: 1767
- Jacques Nicolas Chrestien: 1770
- Pierre Français Boudier: 1773
- André de Malaret: 1775
- Pierre Bourdin: 1778
- Pierre François Boudier: 1781
- Pierre Bourdin: 1784
- André de Malaret: 1788
- François Verneuil: 1791

In 1792, the abbey was secularized amidst the French Revolution. In October 1793, the tombs of the abbey were desecrated. On 25 March 1809, the buildings were given to the Maison d'éducation de la Légion d'honneur.
