= Nithard =

Frankish historian (c. 795–844)

Nithard (c. 795–844), a Frankish historian, was the son of Charlemagne's daughter Bertha. His father was Angilbert.

== Life ==
Nithard was born sometime around the year Charlemagne was crowned Imperator Augustus in December 800. He was probably raised either at the imperial palace, where his mother continued to live until the death of the emperor, or at the monastery of Saint-Riquier, where his father was lay abbot. He would have been educated most likely at the imperial schola, which offered the kind of high-quality instruction in both military and literary training he is known to have received.

Nithard himself later became lay abbot of St Riquier in commendam. He served his cousin Charles the Bald in both war and peace, fighting at his side during the Carolingian civil war and at the battle of Fontenoy in June 841. It is probable that he died as the result of wounds received while fighting for him against the Northmen near Angoulême. The date of his death is disputed among scholars, but consensus is now for June 14, 844. In the 11th century his body, with the fatal wound still visible, was found in the grave of his father, Angilbert.

== Works ==
Nithard's historical work consists of four books on the history of the Carolingian empire under the turbulent sons of the emperor Louis I, especially during the turbulent period between 838 and 843. The Historiae or De dissensionibus filiorum Ludovici pii (On the Dissensions of the Sons of Louis the Pious) is valuable for the light which it throws upon the causes which led to the disintegration of the Carolingian empire. Nithard's work has been described as a "nostalgic lament":

In the times of Charles the Great of good memory,
who died almost thirty years ago, peace and concord ruled everywhere
because our people were treading the one proper way,
the way of the common welfare, and thus the way of God.
But now since each goes his separate way, dissension and struggle abound.
Once there was abundance and happiness everywhere,
now everywhere there is want and sadness

The first three of these books were written before Nithard's appointment as lay abbot of St-Riquier in the winter of 842, the fourth and final in spring of 843 after taking up office there. Although rough in style, partisan in character and sometimes incorrect in detail, the books are the work of a man who had an intimate knowledge of the events which he relates, who possessed a clear and virile mind, and who above all was not a recluse but a man of action. They are dedicated to Charles the Bald, at whose request they were written.

His work as a military intellectual places him in the tradition of Xenophon, Julius Caesar, Ammianus Marcellinus, and Flavius Merobaudes. For the military historian, Nithard's description of the complex exercises of cavalry in Gaul is particularly valuable as a supplement to the account in the Tactical Handbook of Arrian as well as for its insight into Carolingian techniques.

Only two manuscripts of the Historiae survived, one roughly contemporary and an incomplete Renaissance-era text useless in the reconstruction of the text.

- The standard critical edition of Nithard (with French translation) is that of Philippe Lauer, Histoire des fils de Louis le Pieux, Paris: Champion, 1926.
- The 1907 Latin edition of Ernst Müller was republished in 1965 as part of the Monumenta Germaniae Historica series.
- An English translation by Bernhard Walter Scholz and Barbara Rogers is available in Carolingian Chronicles: Royal Frankish Annals and Nithard’s Histories (Ann Arbor: University of Michigan, 1972).
