= Gisela, Abbess of Chelles =

Roman Catholic nun and abbess

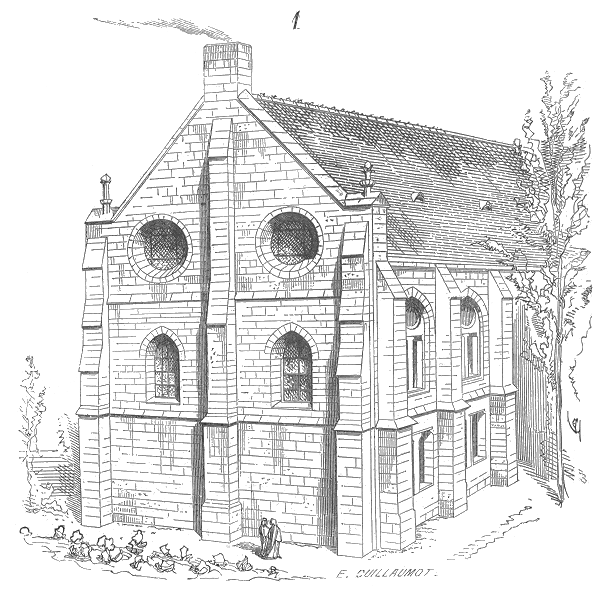
Chelles Abbey, reconstruction of nuns' dormitory. Engraving by Eugène Guillaumot

Gisela (757, Aachen, Cologne, North Rhine-Westphalia, Germany – 810–11, Chelles, Seine-et-Marne, Île-de-France, France) was a Frankish princess and abbess. There are also two variations of her name, which are Gisele and Giselle. She was the daughter of Pepin the Short and his wife Bertrada of Laon. She was the sister of Charlemagne and Carloman.

== Life ==
Early in life Gisela was betrothed to Leo, son of Byzantine Emperor Constantine V, but the contract was broken. There is also a brief mention of Gisela being betrothed to Adalgis, son of the Lombard king Desiderius in 770. It is likely that by this point she had been allowed to choose a life of religion for herself.

Charlemagne's biographer Einhard states that Gisela had been dedicated to religion since her childhood. She became a nun at Chelles Abbey, where she was eventually made abbess. As the abbess at Chelles Abbey, Gisela oversaw one of the most prolific nuns' scriptoria active in the 8th and 9th centuries. While little is known about her education, there is suggestion she was well learned, for her correspondence with Alcuin was written and received in Latin. According to Einhard she had good relations with her brother Charlemagne, who "treated her with the same respect which he showed his mother."

Alcuin was a close friend. Where he wrote personal poems for each of the king's [Charlemagne's] children, he also wrote one for Gisela, in which "Alcuin hailed her as a noble sister in the bond of sweet love, assuring her of her prayers of the brethren at Tours." Other correspondence which hints at a friendly relationship is a letter written to Gisela between 793 and 796, where he thanked her warmly for the gift of a hat. In September 798, he writes to her from his monastery at St. Loup de Troyes, where he laments that an acute fever has stopped him from travelling to see her. In this same letter, he thanks her for the gift of a cross, apparently made at her monastery, and he bade her farewell as a most beloved sister. Along with this, he dedicated the last two books of his commentary on John's gospel to her and her niece, Rotrudis.

Considering the active scriptoria in Gisela's abbey, it can be argued that she held an involved role in the Carolingian Renaissance. Other work she was involved in was the rebuilding of the church of St. Mary at Chelles, as well as building up the library, according to a letter from Alcuin. In it, he encourages her leadership in the project and states his intention to send a pupil and friend, Fredegisus, to assist her.

The specific year of her death is unknown, but she died between 810 and 811 AD in Chelles, Seine-et-Marne, Île-de-France, France, in the convent she had served for most of her life, aged between 53 and 54.

Charlemagne and his wife Hildegard also named a daughter Gisela after the abbess. Gisela the Younger lived from about 781 to after at least 808, but little else is known of her life.
