= Rotrude (daughter of Charlemagne) =

8th-century Frankish Princess, daughter of Charlemagne

- Born: c. 775
- Died: 6 June 810 (aged 34–35)
- Issue: Louis
- Dynasty: Carolingian
- Father: Charlemagne
- Mother: Hildegard

Rotrude (or sometimes referred to as Hruodrud) (c. 775 – 6 June 810) was a Frankish princess, the second daughter of Charlemagne from his marriage to Hildegard.

== Early life ==
Few clear records remain of Rotrude's early life. She was educated in the Palace School by Alcuin, who affectionately calls her Columba in his letters to her. When she was six, her father betrothed her to the Byzantine emperor Constantine VI, whose mother Irene was ruling as regent. The Greeks called her Erythro (Ερυθρώ) and sent a scholar monk called Elisaeus to educate her in Greek language and manners. However, the alliance fell apart by 786 when she was eleven and Constantine's mother, Irene, broke the engagement in 788.

Either shortly before or after the dissolution of the engagement, King Charles declared that he would never allow any of his daughters to marry - so Rotrude and her sisters Beatrude (sometimes called Beatris or Berta) and Gisela never wed. They remained as companions and counselors to their father - dining with him, traveling and studying with him. They each took lovers and had children, however.

Rotrude had a relationship with Rorgo of Rennes and had one son with him, Louis, Abbot of Saint-Denis (800 – 9 January 867). She never married.

== Later life ==
Rotrude eventually became a nun, joining her aunt Gisela, abbess of Chelles. The two women authored a letter to Alcuin of York, who was at Tours at the time, requesting that he write a commentary explaining the Gospel of John. As a result, Alcuin eventually produced his seven-book Commentaria in Iohannem Evangelistam, a more accessible companion to the gospel than St. Augustine's massive and challenging Tractatus in St. John. Commentators have dated the letter to the spring of 800, four years before Alcuin's death and ten before Rotrude's.

In contemporary views of history, most scholars discriminate between the two phases of Rotrude's life. Political histories of her father Charlemagne discuss her as a princess who was potentially a pawn and a woman of questionable morals, while religious histories discuss her as the second nun in the letter from Chelles.
