= Bertha (daughter of Charlemagne) =

Daughter of Charlemagne (c. 780 - after 824)

- Born: 780
- Died: after 11 March 824
- Partner: Angilbert
- Issue: Hartnid; Nithard; Bertha; Arsinde
- Dynasty: Carolingian
- Father: Charlemagne
- Mother: Hildegard

Bertha (c. 780 – after 11 March 824) was the seventh child and third daughter of Charlemagne, King of the Franks, by his second wife, Hildegard.

== Life ==
Bertha was raised with her brothers and sisters in the royal household of Charlemagne, who had all of his children educated by tutors.

An offer by Offa of Mercia to arrange a marriage between Bertha and his son, Ecgfrith, led to Charlemagne breaking off diplomatic relations with Mercia in 790, and banning English ships from his ports. Like her sisters, Bertha never formally married; it has been speculated that Charlemagne did not want his daughters married for strategic reasons, fearing political rivalry from their potential husbands.

Bertha was in a long relationship with Angilbert, a court official, which produced four children. During 794–5, Angilbert presented a poem as a court entertainment, praising the beauty and charms of Charlemagne's daughters; Bertha is praised in particular for having critical discernment and appreciation for poetry, which Angilbert points out is a cause for him to be concerned about how she might receive his poem.

Bertha's children with Angilbert were sons Hartnid, about whom little is known, the historian Nithard, abbot of Saint-Riquier a daughter, Bertha, who went on to marry Helgaud II, Count of Ponthieu and a daughter Arsinde, who married Remigius de Reims and whose daughter Bertha married Raymond de Toulouse. Angilbert ended his affair with Bertha and entered a monastery, becoming Abbot of St. Riquier, according to a biography written by their son, Nithard. Angilbert remained an important advisor to Charlemagne, however. The children of Bertha and Angilbert were likely educated in Charlemagne's court. Nithard was a distinguished soldier and politician, and acted as an advisor to Charles the Bald of France.

Following the death of Charlemagne, his successor, Louis the Pious, exiled his sisters to the convents that had been left for their inheritance by their father.
