= Louis the Pious =

Emperor of the Carolingian Empire from 813 to 840

- Emperor of the Romans
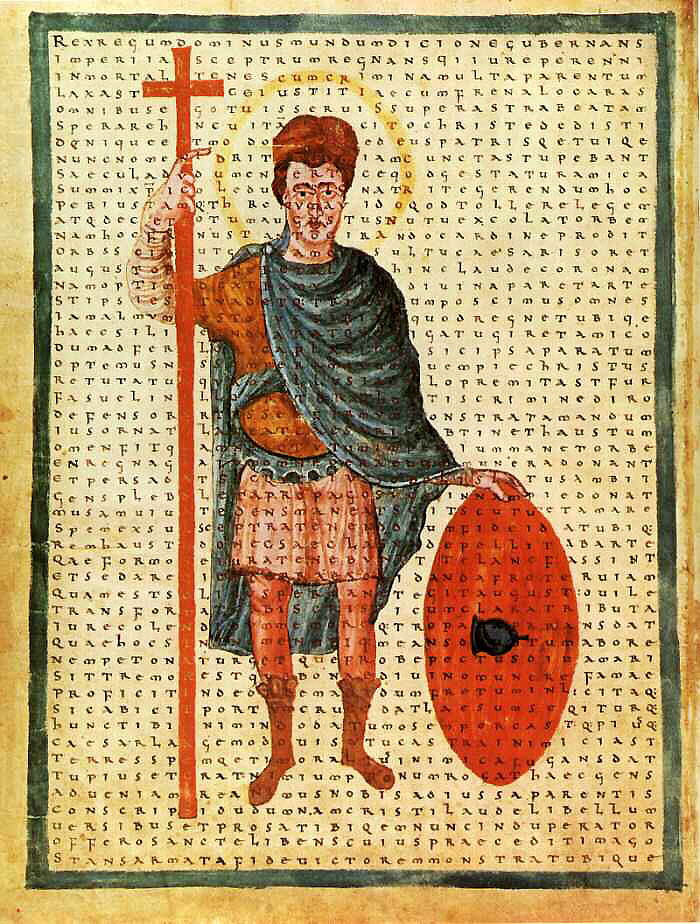
- Louis the Pious, contemporary depiction from 826 as a miles Christi (soldier of Christ), with a poem of Rabanus Maurus overlaid. Vatican, Biblioteca Apostolica, Codex Reg. lat 124, f.4v

Emperor of the Carolingian Empire
- Reign: 11 September 813 – 20 June 840 (Note: Declared deposed by Ebbo, Archbishop of Rheims, between 13 November 833 and 1 March 834.)
- Coronation: 11 September 813, Aachen (Note: Crowned by his father); 5 October 816, Reims (Note: Imperial coronation by Stephen IV)
- Predecessor: Charlemagne
- Successor: Lothair I

King of the Franks
- Reign: 28 January 814 – 20 June 840
- Predecessor: Charlemagne
- Successor: Lothair I (King of Middle Francia); Louis the German (King of East Francia); Charles the Bald (King of West Francia)

King of Aquitaine
- Reign: 781 – 20 June 814
- Predecessor: Charlemagne as King of the Franks
- Successor: Pepin I
- Born: 778; Cassinogilum, Francia
- Died: 20 June 840 (aged 62); Ingelheim, Francia
- Burial: Abbey of Saint-Arnould
- Spouses: Ermengarde of Hesbaye; Judith of Bavaria
- Issue: Lothair I; Pepin of Aquitaine; Louis the German; Gisela; Charles the Bald
- House: Carolingian
- Father: Charlemagne
- Mother: Hildegarde
- Religion: Catholicism

Louis the Pious (Note: Counted as Louis I in the lists of both French and German monarchs.) (Latin: Ludovicus Pius; French: Louis le Pieux; German: Ludwig der Fromme; 778 – 20 June 840), (Note: Latin: Ludovicus or Hludowicus Pius, French: Louis le Pieux or Louis le Débonnaire, German: Ludwig der Fromme, Italian: Ludovico il Pio, Spanish: Luis el Piadoso or Ludovico Pío.) also called the Fair and the Debonaire, was King of the Franks and co-emperor with his father, Charlemagne, from 813. He was also King of Aquitaine from 781. As the only surviving son of Charlemagne and Hildegard, he became the sole ruler of the Franks after his father's death in 814. He held this position until his death in 840, save for November 833 to March 834 when Louis was deposed.

During his reign in Aquitaine, Louis was charged with the defence of the empire's southwestern frontier. He conquered Barcelona from the Emirate of Córdoba in 801 and asserted Frankish authority over Pamplona and the Basques south of the Pyrenees in 812. As emperor, he included his adult sons, Lothair, Pepin and Louis, in the government and sought to establish a suitable division of the realm among them. The first decade of his reign was characterised by several tragedies and embarrassments, notably the brutal treatment of his nephew Bernard of Italy for which Louis atoned in a public act of self-debasement.

In the 830s his empire was torn by civil war between his sons that was only exacerbated by Louis's attempts to include his son Charles by his second wife in the succession plans. Though his reign ended on a high note, with order largely restored to his empire, it was followed by three years of civil war. Louis is generally compared unfavourably to his father but faced distinctly different problems.

== Birth and rule in Aquitaine ==
Louis was born in 778, while his father Charlemagne was on campaign through the Pyrenees, at the Carolingian villa of Cassinogilum, according to Einhard and the anonymous chronicler called Astronomus; the place is usually identified with Chasseneuil, near Poitiers. He was the third son of Charlemagne by his wife Hildegard. He had a twin brother named Lothair, who died young. Louis and Lothair were given names from the old Merovingian dynasty, possibly to suggest a connection.

Louis was crowned King of Aquitaine as a three-year-old child in 781. In the following year he was sent to Aquitaine accompanied by regents and a court. Charlemagne constituted this sub-kingdom in order to secure the border of his realm after the destructive war against the Aquitanians and Basques under Waifar (capitulated c. 768) and later Hunald II, which culminated in the disastrous Battle of Roncesvalles (778). Charlemagne wanted Louis to grow up in the area where he was to reign. However, wary of the customs his son may have been assimilating into in Aquitaine, Charlemagne, who had remarried to Fastrada after the death of Hildegard, sent for Louis in 785. Louis presented himself in Saxony at the royal Council of Paderborn dressed in Basque costumes along with other youths in the same garment, which may have made a good impression in Toulouse, since the Basques of Vasconia were a mainstay of the Aquitanian army.

In 794, Charlemagne gave four former Gallo-Roman villas to Louis, in the thought that he would take in each in turn as winter residence: Doué, Ebreuil, Angeac and the Chasseneuil. Charlemagne's intention was to see all his sons brought up as natives of their given territories, wearing the national costume of the region and ruling by the local customs. Thus were the children sent to their respective realms at a young age. The marches—peripheral principalities—played a vital role as bulwarks against exterior threats to the empire. Louis reigned over the Spanish March. In 797, Barcelona, the largest city of the Marca, fell to the Franks when Zeid, its governor, rebelled against Córdoba and, failing, handed it to them. The Córdoban authority recaptured it in 799. However, Louis marched the entire army of his kingdom, including Gascons with their duke Sancho I of Gascony, Provençals under Leibulf, and Goths under Bera, over the Pyrenees and besieged it for seven months, wintering there from 800 to 801, when it capitulated. King Louis was formally invested with his armour in 791 at the age of fourteen. However, the princes were not given independence from central authority as Charlemagne wished to implant in them the concepts of empire and unity by sending them on remote military expeditions. Louis joined his brother Pippin at the Mezzogiorno campaign in Italy against the Duke Grimoald of Benevento at least once.

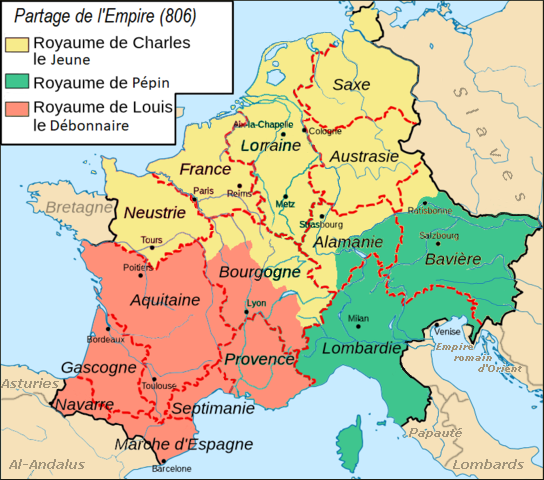
The initial realms of Louis (red), under the Divisio Regnorum (806)

Louis was one of Charlemagne's three legitimate sons to survive infancy. His twin brother, Lothair, died during infancy. According to the Frankish custom of partible inheritance, Louis had expected to share his inheritance with his brothers, Charles the Younger, King of Neustria, and Pepin, King of Italy. In the Divisio Regnorum of 806, Charlemagne had slated Charles the Younger as his successor as ruler of the Frankish heartland of Neustria and Austrasia, while giving Pepin the Iron Crown of Lombardy, which Charlemagne possessed by conquest. To Louis's kingdom of Aquitaine, he added Septimania, Provence, and part of Burgundy. However, Charlemagne's other legitimate sons died—Pepin in 810 and Charles in 811—and Louis was crowned co-emperor with an already ailing Charlemagne in Aachen on 11 September 813. On his father's death in 814, he inherited the entire Carolingian Empire and all its possessions (with the sole exception of the kingdom of Italy; although within Louis's empire, in 813 Charlemagne had ordered that Bernard, Pepin's son, be made and called king).

== Reign ==
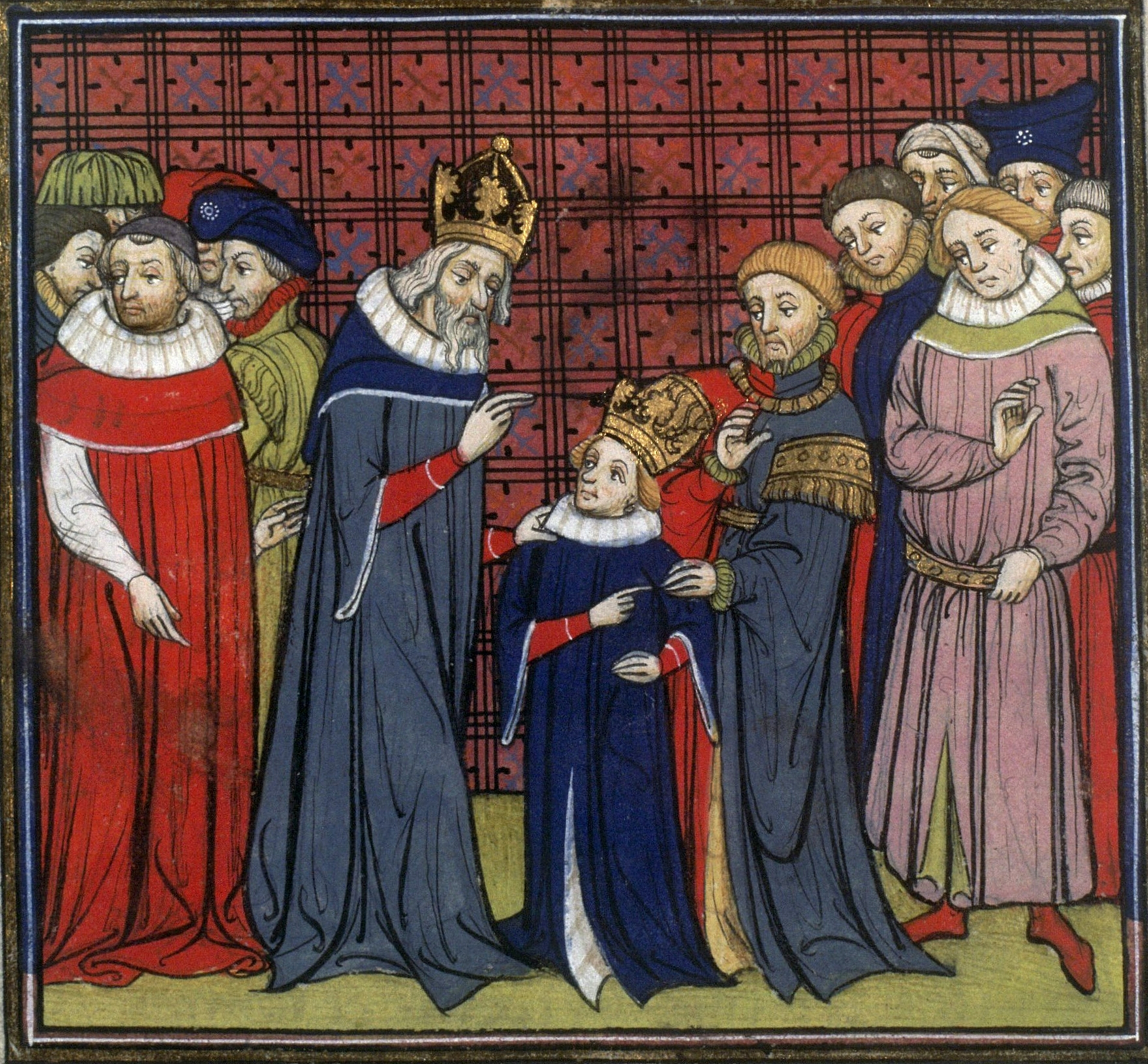
Charlemagne crowns Louis the Pious

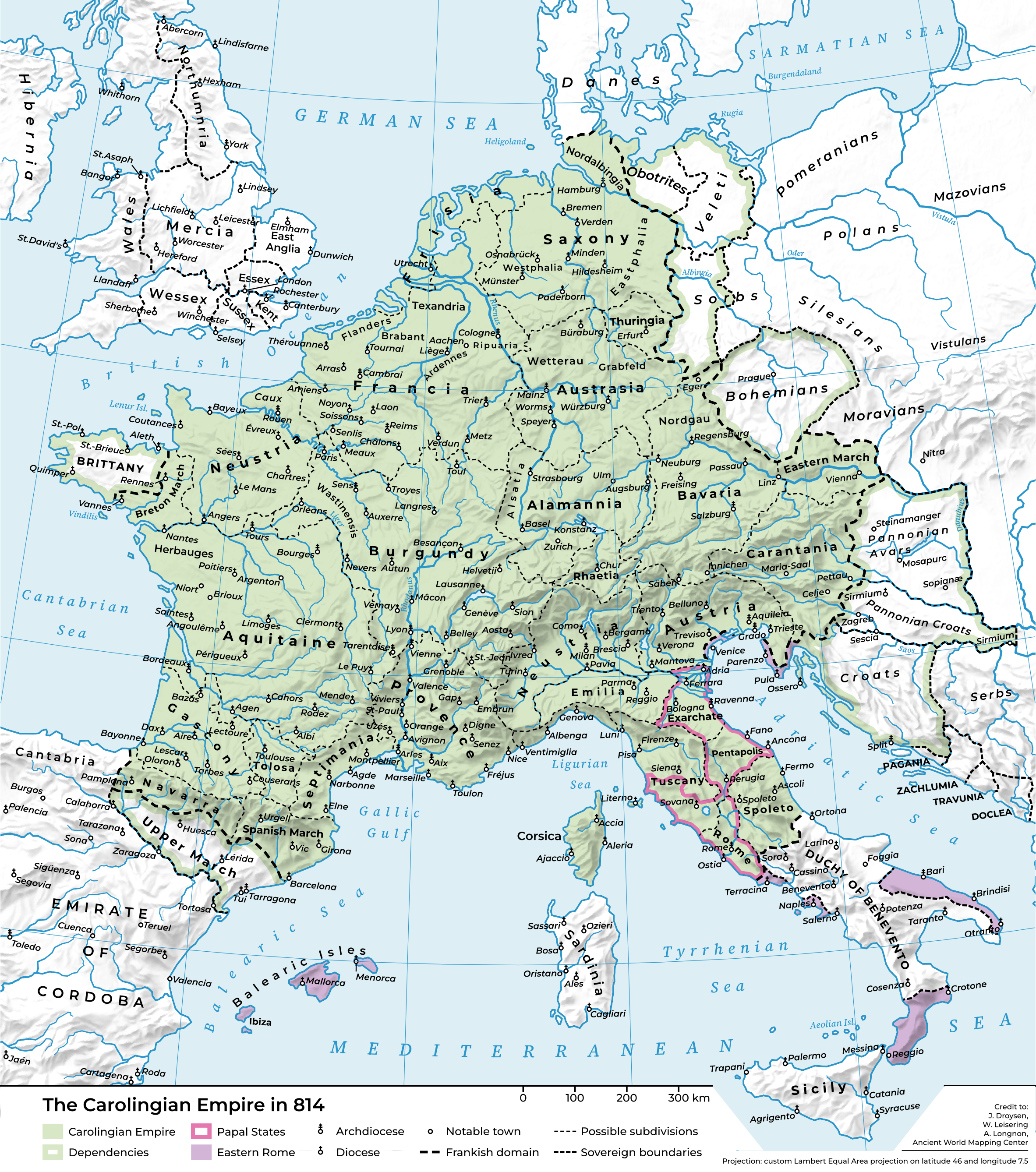
The Carolingian Empire in 814

While at his palace of Doué, Anjou, Louis received news of his father's death. He rushed to Aachen and crowned himself emperor to shouts of Vivat Imperator Ludovicus by the attending nobles.

Upon arriving at the imperial court in Aachen in an atmosphere of suspicion and anxiety on both sides, Louis's first act was to purge the palace of what he considered undesirable. He destroyed the old Germanic pagan tokens and texts which had been collected by Charlemagne. He further exiled members of the court he deemed morally "dissolute", including some of his own relatives.

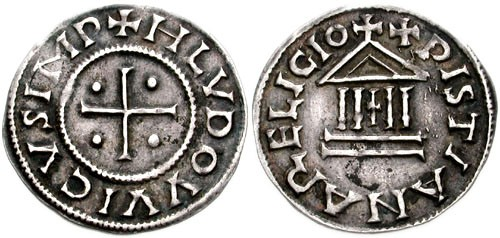
Denarius of Louis

He quickly sent all of his many unmarried (half-)sisters and nieces to nunneries in order to avoid any possible entanglements from overly powerful brothers-in-law. Sparing his illegitimate half-brothers Drogo, Hugh and Theoderic, he forced his father's cousins, Adalard and Wala to be tonsured, sending them into monastic exile at St-Philibert on the island of Noirmoutier and Corbie, respectively, despite the latter's initial loyalty.

He made Bernard, margrave of Septimania, and Ebbo, Archbishop of Reims his chief counsellors. The latter, born a serf, was raised by Louis to that office, but betrayed him later. He retained some of his father's ministers, such as Elisachar, abbot of St. Maximin near Trier, and Hildebold, Archbishop of Cologne. Later he replaced Elisachar with Hildwin, abbot of many monasteries.

He also employed Benedict of Aniane (the Second Benedict), a Septimanian Visigoth, whom he made abbot of the newly established Inden Monastery at Aix-la-Chapelle and charged him with the reform of the Frankish church. One of Benedict's primary reforms was to ensure that all religious houses in Louis's realm adhered to the Rule of Saint Benedict, named for its creator, Benedict of Nursia. From the start of his reign, his coinage imitated his father Charlemagne's portrait, which gave it an image of imperial authority and prestige. In 816, Pope Stephen IV, who had succeeded Leo III, visited Reims and again crowned Louis on Sunday 5 October. As a result, most French kings were crowned in Reims, following the custom established by Louis the Pious.

=== Ordinatio imperii ===
On 9 April 817, Maundy Thursday, Louis and his court were crossing a wooden gallery from the cathedral to the palace in Aachen, when the gallery collapsed, killing many. Louis, having barely survived and realizing death was imminent, began planning for his succession. Three months later among the approval of his Aachen court and the clergy he issued an imperial decree of eighteen chapters, the Ordinatio Imperii, that laid out plans for an orderly dynastic succession. The term Ordinatio Imperii is a modern (19th-century) creation. The decree is called divisio imperii in the only surviving contemporary manuscript.

In 815, Louis had already given his two eldest sons a share in the government, when he had sent his elder sons Lothair and Pepin to govern Bavaria and Aquitaine, respectively, though without the royal titles. He proceeded to divide the empire among his three sons:

- Lothair was proclaimed and crowned co-emperor in Aachen by his father. He was promised the succession to most of the Frankish dominions (excluding the exceptions below), and would be the overlord of his brothers and cousin.
- Pepin was proclaimed King of Aquitaine, his territory including Gascony, the march around Toulouse, and the counties of Carcassonne, Autun, Avallon and Nevers.
- Louis, the youngest son, was proclaimed King of Bavaria and the neighbouring marches.

If one of the subordinate kings died, he was to be succeeded by his sons. If he died childless, Lothair would inherit his kingdom. In the event of Lothair dying without sons, one of Louis the Pious's younger sons would be chosen to replace him by "the people". Above all, the Empire would not be divided: the Emperor would rule supreme over the subordinate kings, whose obedience to him was mandatory.

With this settlement, Louis attempted to combine his sense for the Empire's unity, supported by the clergy, while at the same time providing positions for all of his sons. Instead of treating his sons equally in status and land, he elevated his first-born son Lothair above his younger brothers and gave him the largest part of the Empire as his share.

The decree failed to create order as it omitted Bernard, who immediately began to conspire. When Louis began to issue changes in favor of his second wife Judith's son Charles the Bald, his sons Lothar, Pepin and Louis refused to accept. The rule of sons being favoured over brothers in succession remained also untouched.

=== Bernard's rebellion and Louis's penance ===
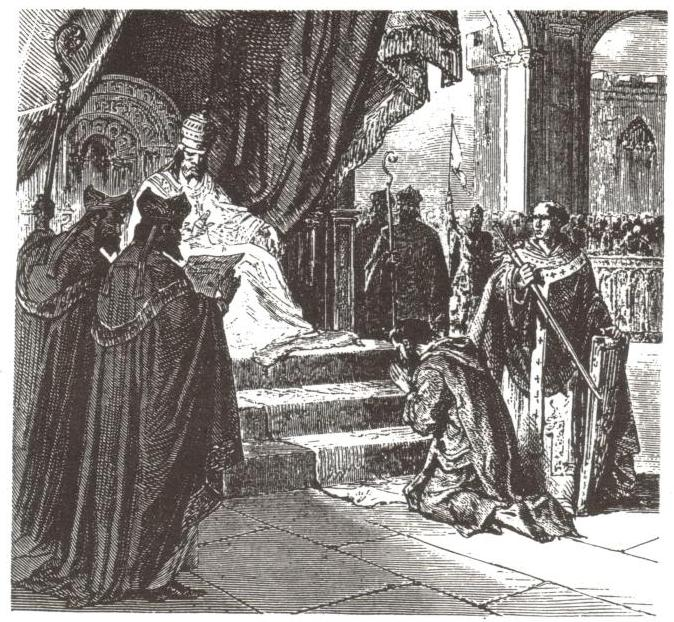
Louis the Pious doing penance at Attigny in 833

The ordinatio imperii of Aachen left Bernard in Italy in an uncertain and subordinate position as king of Italy, and he began plotting to declare independence. Upon hearing of this, Louis immediately directed his army towards Italy, and headed for Chalon-sur-Saône. Intimidated by the emperor's swift action, Bernard met his uncle at Chalon, under invitation, and surrendered. He was taken to Aachen by Louis, who there had him tried and condemned to death for treason. Louis had the sentence commuted to blinding, which was duly carried out; Bernard did not survive the ordeal, however, dying after two days of agony. Others also suffered: Theodulf of Orléans, in eclipse since the death of Charlemagne, was accused of having supported the rebellion, and was thrown into a monastic prison, dying soon afterwards; it was rumored that he had been poisoned. The fate of his nephew deeply marked Louis's conscience for the rest of his life.

In 833, as a deeply religious man, Louis performed penance for causing Bernard's death, at his palace of Attigny near Vouziers in the Ardennes, before Pope Paschal I, and a council of clerics and nobles of the realm that had been convened for the reconciliation of Louis with his three younger half-brothers, Hugo whom he soon made abbot of St-Quentin, Drogo whom he soon made Bishop of Metz, and Theodoric. This act of contrition, partly in emulation of Theodosius I, had the effect of greatly reducing his prestige as a Frankish ruler, for he also recited a list of minor offences about which no secular ruler of the time would have taken any notice. He also made the egregious error of releasing Wala and Adalard from their monastic confinements, placing the former in a position of power in the court of Lothair and the latter in a position in his own house.

=== Frontier wars ===
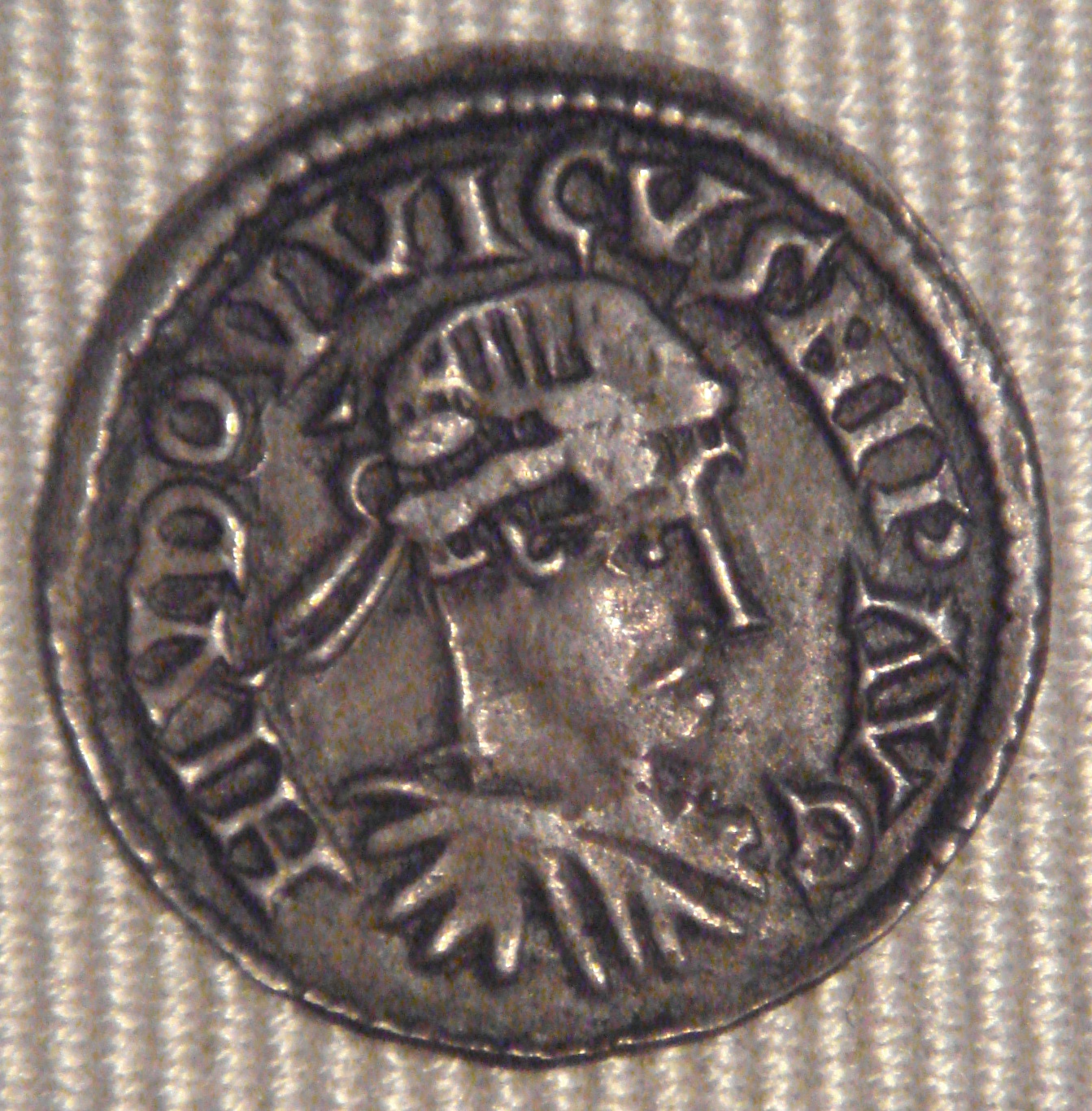
Louis on a denarius from Sens, 818–823

At the start of Louis's reign, the many tribes—Danes, Obotrites, Slavs of Pannonia, Bretons and Basques—which inhabited his frontierlands were still in awe of the Frankish emperor's power and dared not stir up any trouble. In 816, however, the Sorbs rebelled, and were quickly followed by Slavomir, chief of the Obotrites, who was captured and abandoned by his own people, being replaced by Ceadrag in 818. Soon, Ceadrag too had turned against the Franks and allied with the Danes, who were to become the greatest menace to the Franks in a short time.

A greater Slavic menace was gathering on the southeast. There, Ljudevit, duke of Slavs in Lower Pannonia, was harassing the border at the Drava and Sava rivers. The margrave of Friuli, Cadolah, was sent out against him, but he died on campaign and, in 820, his margravate was invaded by Slavs. In 821, an alliance was made with Borna, duke of the Dalmatia, and Liudewit was brought to heel. In 824 several Slav tribes in the north-western parts of Bulgaria acknowledged Louis's suzerainty and after he was reluctant to settle the matter peacefully with the Bulgarian ruler Omurtag, in 827 the Bulgarians attacked the Franks in the March of Pannonia and regained their lands.

On the far southern edge of his great realm, Louis had to control the Lombard princes of Benevento whom Charlemagne had never subjugated. He extracted promises from Princes Grimoald IV and Sico, but to no effect.

On the southwestern frontier, problems commenced early when c. 812, Louis the Pious crossed the western Pyrenees 'to settle matters' in Pamplona. The expedition made its way back north, where it narrowly escaped an ambush attempt arranged by the Basques in the pass of Roncevaux thanks to the precautions he took, i.e. hostages. Séguin, duke of Gascony, was then deposed by Louis in 816, possibly for failing to suppress or collaborating with the Basque revolt south of the western Pyrenees, so sparking off a Basque uprising that was duly put down by the Frankish emperor in Dax. Seguin was replaced by Lupus III, who was dispossessed in 818 by the emperor. In 820 an assembly at Quierzy-sur-Oise decided to send an expedition against the Cordoban caliphate (827). The counts in charge of the army, Hugh, count of Tours, and Matfrid, count of Orléans, were slow in acting and the expedition came to naught.

=== First civil war ===
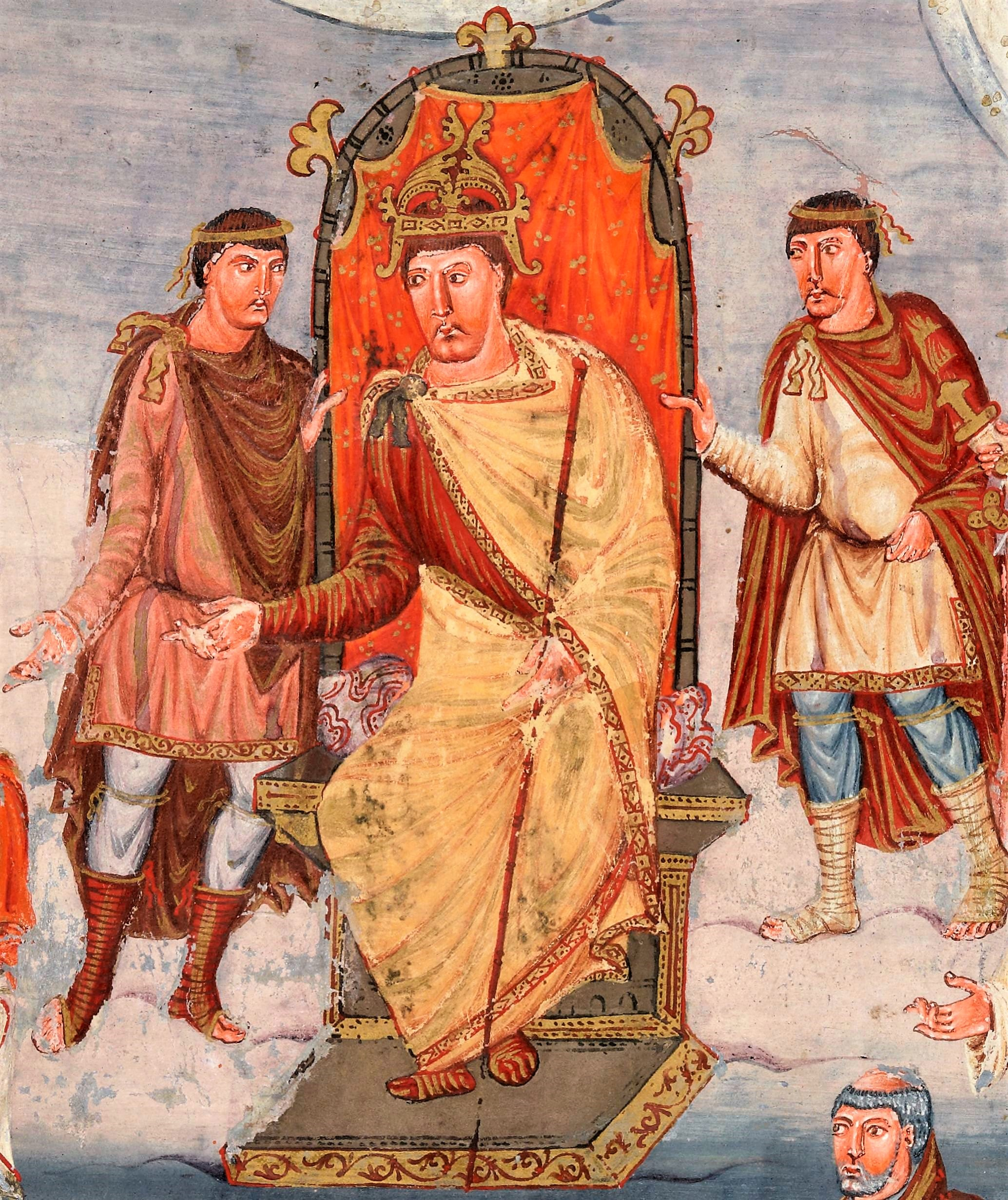
Louis's son Charles the Bald as depicted in the Vivian Bible, c. 845

In 818, as Louis was returning from a campaign to Brittany, he was greeted by news of the death of his wife, Ermengarde. Ermengarde was the daughter of Ingerman, the duke of Hesbaye. Louis had been close to his wife, who had been involved in policymaking. It was rumoured that she had played a part in her nephew's death and Louis himself believed her own death was divine retribution for that event. It took many months for his courtiers and advisors to convince him to remarry, but eventually he did, in 820, to Judith, daughter of Welf, count of Altdorf. In 823 Judith gave birth to a son, who was named Charles.

The birth of this son damaged the Partition of Aachen, as Louis's attempts to provide for his fourth son met with stiff resistance from his older sons, and the last two decades of his reign were marked by civil war. At Worms in 829, Louis gave Alemannia to Charles, with the title of king or duke (historians differ on this), thus enraging his son and co-emperor Lothair, whose promised share was thereby diminished. An insurrection was soon at hand.

With the urging of the vengeful Wala and the cooperation of his brothers, Lothair accused Judith of having committed adultery with Bernard of Septimania, even suggesting Bernard to be the true father of Charles. Ebbo and Hildwin abandoned the emperor at that point, Bernard having risen to greater heights than either of them. Agobard, Archbishop of Lyon, and Jesse, bishop of Amiens, too, opposed the redivision of the empire and lent their episcopal prestige to the rebels.

In 830, at Wala's insistence that Bernard of Septimania was plotting against him, Pepin of Aquitaine led an army of Gascons, with the support of the Neustrian magnates, all the way to Paris. At Verberie, Louis the German joined him. At that time, the emperor returned from another campaign in Brittany to find his empire at war with itself. He marched as far as Compiègne, an ancient royal town, before being surrounded by Pepin's forces and captured. Judith was incarcerated at Poitiers and Bernard fled to Barcelona.

Then Lothair finally set out with a large Lombard army, but Louis had promised his sons Louis the German and Pepin of Aquitaine greater shares of the inheritance, prompting them to shift loyalties in favour of their father. When Lothair tried to call a general council of the realm in Nijmegen, in the heart of Austrasia, the Austrasians and Rhinelanders came with a following of armed retainers, and the disloyal sons were forced to free their father and bow at his feet (831). Lothair was pardoned, but disgraced and banished to Italy.

Pepin returned to Aquitaine and Judith—after being forced to humiliate herself with a solemn oath of innocence—to Louis's court. Only Wala was severely dealt with, making his way to a secluded monastery on the shores of Lake Geneva. Although Hilduin, abbot of Saint Denis, was exiled to Paderborn and Elisachar and Matfrid were deprived of their honours north of the Alps, they did not lose their freedom.

=== Second civil war ===
The next revolt occurred a mere two years later, in 832. The disaffected Pepin was summoned to his father's court, where he was so poorly received he left against his father's orders. Immediately, fearing that Pepin would be stirred up to revolt by his nobles and desiring to reform his morals, Louis the Pious summoned all his forces to meet in Aquitaine in preparation of an uprising, but Louis the German garnered an army of Slav allies and conquered Swabia before the emperor could react. Once again the elder Louis divided his vast realm. At Jonac, he declared Charles king of Aquitaine and deprived Pepin (he was less harsh with the younger Louis), restoring the whole rest of the empire to Lothair, not yet involved in the civil war. Lothair was, however, interested in usurping his father's authority. His ministers had been in contact with Pepin and may have convinced him and Louis the German to rebel, promising him Alemannia, the kingdom of Charles.

Soon Lothair, with the support of Pope Gregory IV, whom he had confirmed in office without his father's support, joined the revolt in 833. While Louis was at Worms gathering a new force, Lothair marched north. Louis marched south. The armies met on the plains of the Rothfeld. There, Gregory met the emperor and may have tried to sow dissension amongst his ranks. Soon much of Louis's army had evaporated before his eyes, and he ordered his few remaining followers to go, because "it would be a pity if any man lost his life or limb on my account." The resigned emperor was taken to Saint-Médard de Soissons, his son Charles to Prüm, and the queen to Tortona. The despicable show of disloyalty and disingenuousness earned the site the name Field of Lies, or Lügenfeld, or Campus Mendacii, ubi plurimorum fidelitas exstincta est.

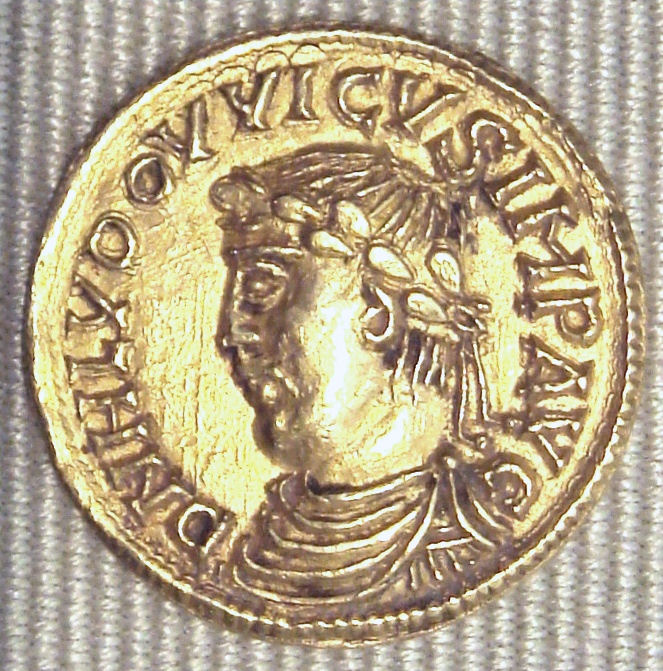
Louis on a sesquisolidus, essentially Roman in design

On 13 November 833, Ebbo, with Agobard of Lyon, presided over a synod at the Church of Saint Medard in Soissons which saw Louis undertake public penance for the second time in his reign. The penitential ritual that was undertaken began when Louis arrived at the church and confessed multiple times to the crimes levied against him. The crimes had been historic and recent, with accusations of oath breaking, violation of the public peace and inability to control his adulterous wife, Judith of Bavaria. Afterwards, he threw his sword belt at the base of the altar and received judgement through the imposition of the hands of the bishops. Louis was to live the rest of his life as a penitent, never to hold office again. The penance divided the aristocracy. The anonymous biographer of the Vita Hludovici criticized the whole affair on the basis that God does not judge twice for sins committed and confessed. Lothair's allies were generously compensated. Ebbo himself received the monastery of St Vaast whilst Pepin was allowed to keep the lands reclaimed from his father.

Men like Rabanus Maurus, Louis's younger half-brothers Drogo and Hugh, and Emma, Judith's sister and Louis the German's new wife, worked on the younger Louis to make peace with his father, for the sake of unity of the empire. The humiliation to which Louis was then subjected at Notre Dame in Compiègne turned the loyal barons of Austrasia and Saxony against Lothair, and the usurper fled to Burgundy, skirmishing with loyalists near Chalon-sur-Saône. Louis was restored the next year, on 1 March 834.

On Lothair's return to Italy, Wala, Jesse and Matfrid, formerly count of Orléans, died of a pestilence. On 2 February 835 at the palace Thionville, Louis presided over a general council to deal with the events of the previous year. Known as the Synod of Thionville, Louis himself was reinvested with his ancestral garb and the crown, symbols of Carolingian rulership. Furthermore, the penance of 833 was officially reversed and Archbishop Ebbo officially resigned after confessing to a capital crime, whilst Agobard of Lyon and Bartholmew, Archbishop of Narbonne were also deposed. Later that year Lothair fell ill; once again the events turned in Louis favour.

In 836, however, the family made peace and Louis restored Pepin and Louis, deprived Lothair of all save Italy, and gave it to Charles in a new division, given at the diet of Crémieu. At about that time, the Vikings terrorized and sacked Utrecht and Antwerp. In 837, they went up the Rhine as far as Nijmegen, and their king, Rorik, demanded the weregild of some of his followers killed on previous expeditions before Louis the Pious mustered a massive force and marched against them. They fled, but it would not be the last time they harried the northern coasts. In 838, they even claimed sovereignty over Frisia, but a treaty was confirmed between them and the Franks in 839. Louis the Pious ordered the construction of a North Sea fleet and the sending of missi dominici into Frisia to establish Frankish sovereignty there.

=== Third civil war ===
In 837, Louis crowned Charles king over all of Alemannia and Burgundy and gave him a portion of his brother Louis's land. Louis the German promptly rose in revolt, and the emperor redivided his realm again at Quierzy-sur-Oise, giving all of the young king of Bavaria's lands, save Bavaria itself, to Charles. Emperor Louis did not stop there, however. His devotion to Charles knew no bounds. When Pepin died in 838, Louis declared Charles the new king of Aquitaine. The nobles, however, elected Pepin's son Pepin II. When Louis threatened invasion, the third great civil war of his reign broke out. In the spring of 839, Louis the German invaded Swabia, Pepin II and his Gascon subjects fought all the way to the Loire, and the Danes returned to ravage the Frisian coast (sacking Dorestad for a second time).

Lothair, for the first time in a long time, allied with his father and pledged support at Worms in exchange for a redivision of the inheritance. At a final placitum held at Worms on 20 May, Louis gave Bavaria to Louis the German and disinherited Pepin II, leaving the entire remainder of the empire to be divided roughly into an eastern part and a western. Lothair was given the choice of which partition he would inherit and he chose the eastern, including Italy, leaving the western for Charles. The emperor quickly subjugated Aquitaine and had Charles recognised by the nobles and clergy at Clermont-en-Auvergne in 840. Louis then, in a final flash of glory, rushed into Bavaria and forced the younger Louis into the Ostmark. The empire now settled as he had declared it at Worms, he returned in July to Frankfurt am Main, where he disbanded the army. The final civil war of his reign was over.

== Death ==
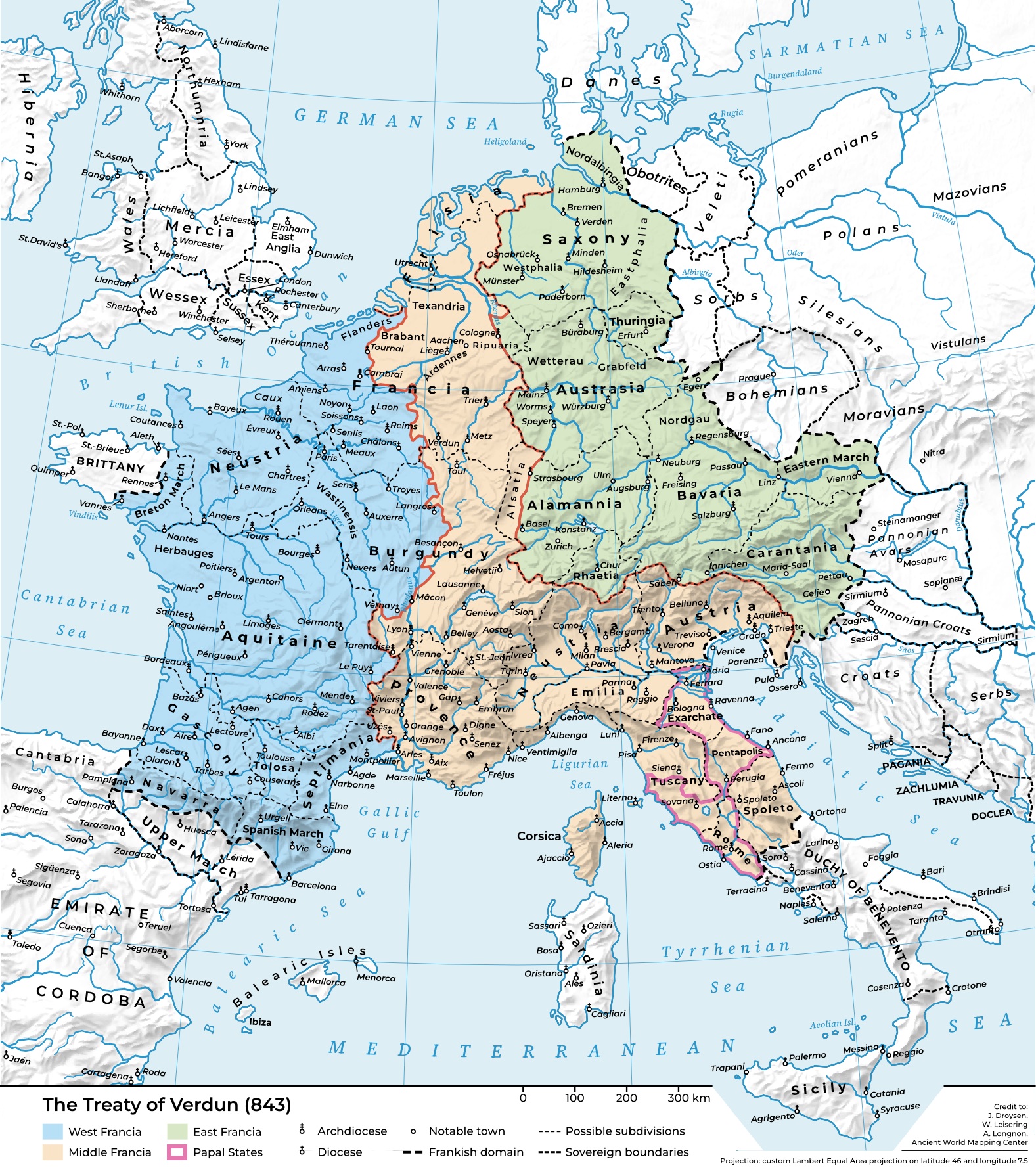
The parting of the Carolingian Empire by the Treaty of Verdun in 843

Louis fell ill soon after his final victorious campaigns and retreated to his summer hunting lodge on an island in the Rhine near his palace at Ingelheim. He died on 20 June 840 in the presence of many bishops and clerics and in the arms of his half-brother Drogo as he pardoned his son Louis, proclaimed Lothair emperor and commended the absent Charles and Judith to his protection.

Soon dispute plunged the surviving brothers into yet another civil war. It lasted until 843 with the signing of the Treaty of Verdun, in which the division of the empire into three souvereign entities was settled. West Francia and East Francia became the kernels of modern France and Germany respectively. Middle Francia, that included Burgundy, the Low Countries and northern Italy among other regions was only short-lived until 855 and later reorganized as Lotharingia. The dispute over the kingship of Aquitaine was not fully settled until 860.

Louis was buried in the Abbey of Saint-Arnould in Metz.

== Marriage and issue ==
By his first wife, Ermengarde of Hesbaye (married c. 794), he had three sons and three daughters:

- Lothair (795–855), Emperor and king of Middle Francia
- Pepin (797–838), king of Aquitaine
- Adelaide (b. c. 799)
- Rotrude (b. 800), married Gerard, Count of Auvergne
- Hildegard (or Matilda) (b. c. 802)
- Louis the German (c. 806 – 876), king of East Francia

By his second wife, Judith of Bavaria, he had a daughter and a son:

- Gisela, married Eberhard of Friuli
- Charles the Bald, king of West Francia and later Emperor

Louis had an illegitimate son and daughter:

- Arnulf of Sens
- Alpaïs of Paris

== Sources ==
- Goldberg, Eric J. (2006). Struggle for Empire: Kingship and Conflict under Louis the German, 817-876. Ithaca, NY: Cornell University Press.
- McKitterick, Rosamond (1983). The Frankish Kingdoms Under the Carolingians, 751-987. Harlow: Longman.
- McKitterick, Rosamond (2008). Charlemagne: The Formation of a European Identity. Cambridge: Cambridge University Press.
- Nelson, Janet L. (1991). The Annals of St-Bertin. Manchester: Manchester University Press.
- Riché, Pierre (1993). The Carolingians: A Family Who Forged Europe. Philadelphia: University of Pennsylvania Press.
- Gesta Hludowici Imperatoris by Thegan of Trier on-line Latin text

Louis the Pious Carolingian dynasty Born: 778 20 June
Regnal titles
New title	King of Aquitaine; 781–814	Succeeded by Pepin I
Preceded by Charlemagne	Carolingian Emperor; 813–840 with Lothair I (817–840)	Succeeded by Lothair I
Preceded by Charlemagne	King of the Franks; 814–840	Succeeded by Lothair I as king of Middle Francia
Preceded by Charlemagne	King of the Franks; 814–840	Succeeded by Louis II as king of East Francia
Preceded by Charlemagne	King of the Franks; 814–840	Succeeded by Charles II as king of West Francia
