= Odo of Metz =

Frankish architect

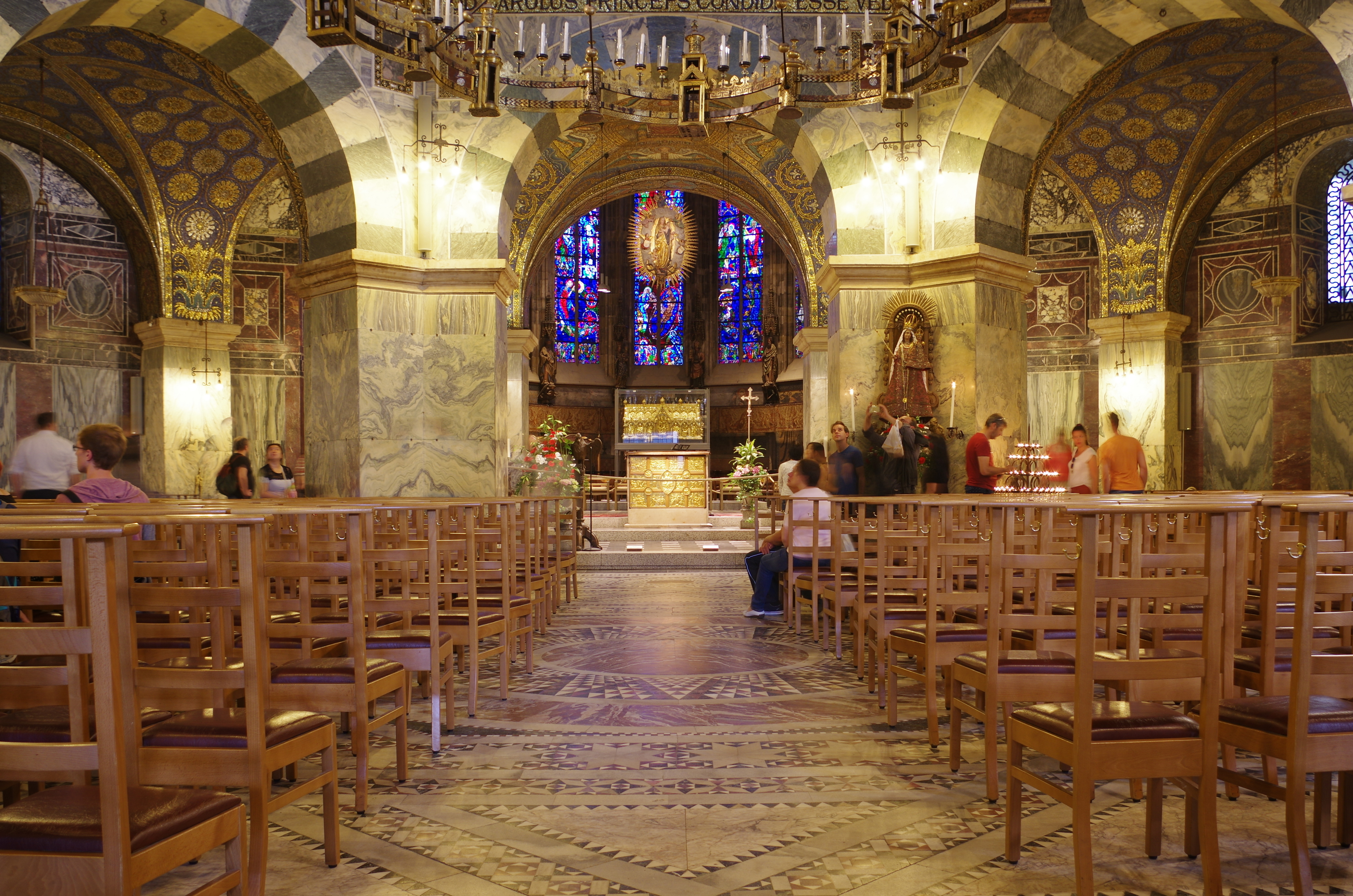
Inside view of the Palatine Chapel, by Odo of Metz

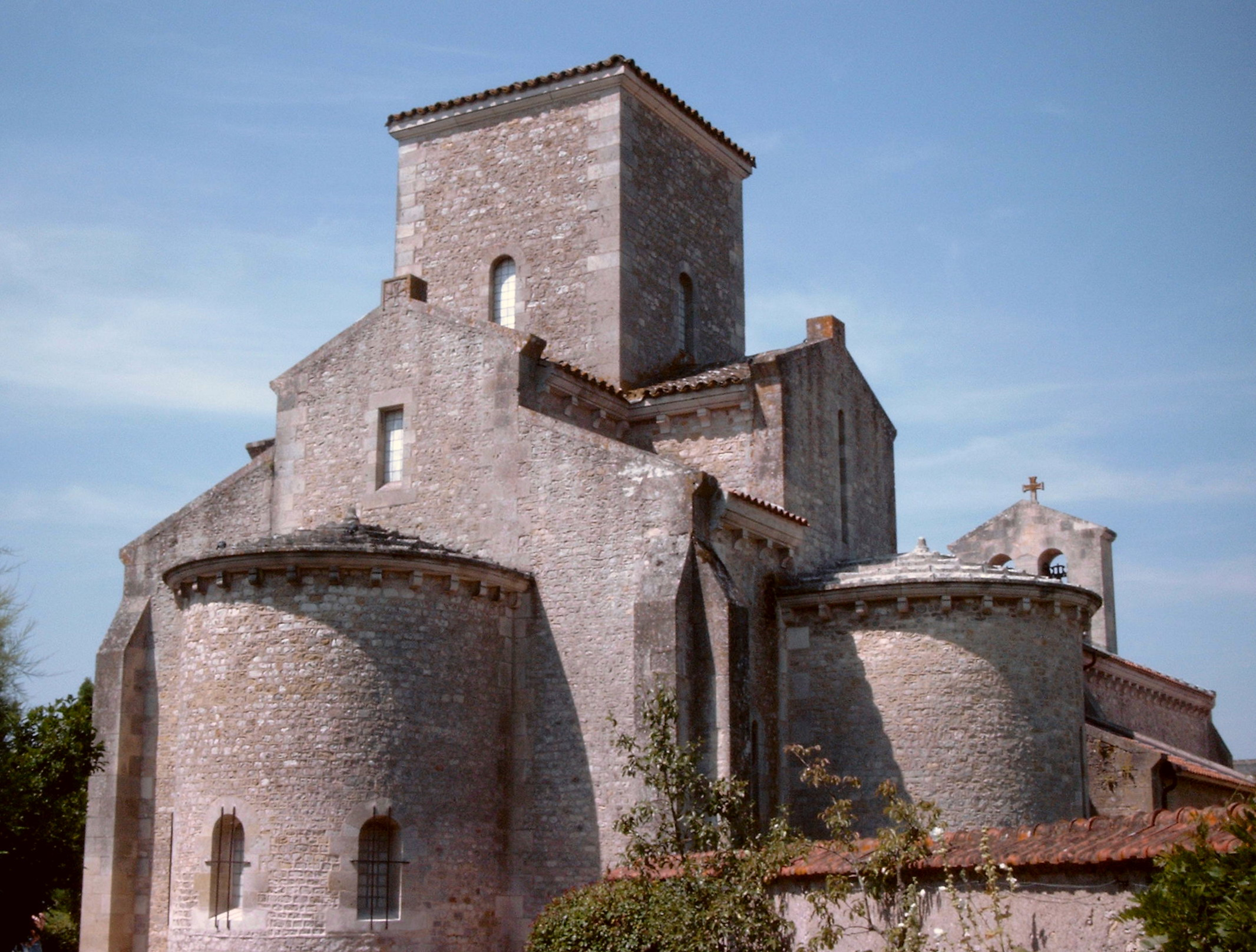
Oratory of Germigny-des-Prés, by Odo of Metz

Odo of Metz (Note: The name "Odo" is also rendered Oto, Otto, Oton or Odon.) or Eudes of Metz (fl. c. 806 – c. 811) was a Frankish architect, maybe of possible Armenian origin, who lived in the Carolingian Empire during Charlemagne's reign.

Nothing is known of Odo's life, training or education. It is possible he was of Armenian origin; the tradition may stem from a perceived association between the innovative style of his works and early Armenian churches. There is no concrete evidence of his origins, however.

== Historiography ==
The sole record of Odo's existence and work comes from a mention of him in an inscription commemorating Charlemagne, the text of which survives in the emperor's Vita ('life'). It says nothing of Odo's origin.

While there is no documentary evidence of Odo's background, his reputation as Armenian arose only from the perception that the oratory he built at Germigny-des-Prés and the Armenian mother church, Etchmiadzin Cathedral, might come from the same architectural tradition. There was already such a folk tradition typically present among Armenians in France from the 19th century, possibly influenced by this perception. The Polish art historian Josef Strzygowski and the Soviet-Armenian architectural historian Alexander Sahinian strengthened the belief and the broader assumption with their theories of the Armenian roots of Odo's architecture. Strzygowski's and Sahinian's theories were never widely accepted by scholarly consensus.

A fringe report was made during the 1960s renovations of Aachen Cathedral, that a researcher had unearthed an inscribed stone, with Odo said to be mentioned in it as coming "from the region of Mount Ararat", (i.e. Armenia). No authenticated record of this inscription survives, and the location of the stone itself is unknown.

== Style and works ==
Odo's Carolingian architecture with polygonal-based domes and elaborate elevations are reminiscent of late Roman architecture with Byzantine style. In particular, his design for the Palatine Chapel, Aachen, was possibly modelled on the Basilica of San Vitale of Ravenna. It is unknown whether he saw these buildings himself, or only drawings of them.

Odo may have had access to the extensive technical knowledge embodied in the classical work De architectura through his connection to the royal court. The text of Vitruvius' treatise is known to have been copied and preserved in Charlemagne's court scriptorium, and it is through these Carolingian Renaissance-era manuscripts that the work survived, widely rediscovered in the Middle Ages, and down to modern times.

Eudes of Metz is credited as the architect of:

- Charlemagne's Palace of Aachen with the Palatine Chapel (792–805), in Aachen
- the church of Germigny-des-Prés in 806–811

== See also ==
- Carolingian art
- Metz
