= Prélude d'Eginhard =

1893 composition by Erik Satie

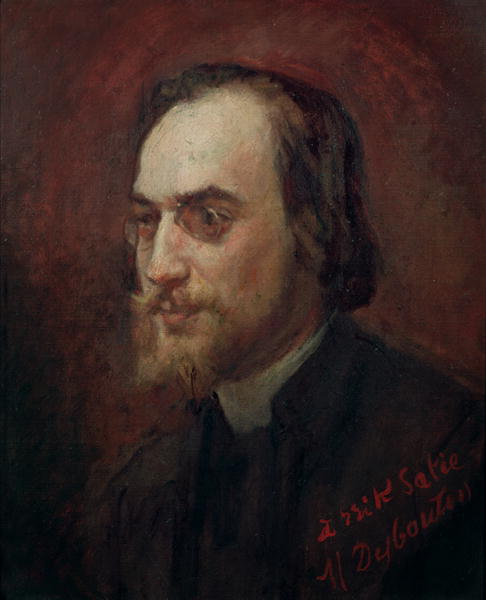
Erik Satie, portrait by Marcellin Desboutin (1893)

The Prélude d'Eginhard (Prelude to Eginhard) is an 1893 composition for solo piano by Erik Satie. It is a notable example of his "Rosicrucian" or "mystic" period. Unpublished during his lifetime, it was issued posthumously in 1929. A typical performance lasts under 3 minutes.

Although it stands as one of Satie's more obscure pieces, it has been admired for its succinctness and well-balanced musical construction. Composer-musicologist Patrick Gowers ventured that the Prélude d'Eginhard was "perhaps the most perfect miniature" in all of Satie's Rose + Croix music.

== Description ==
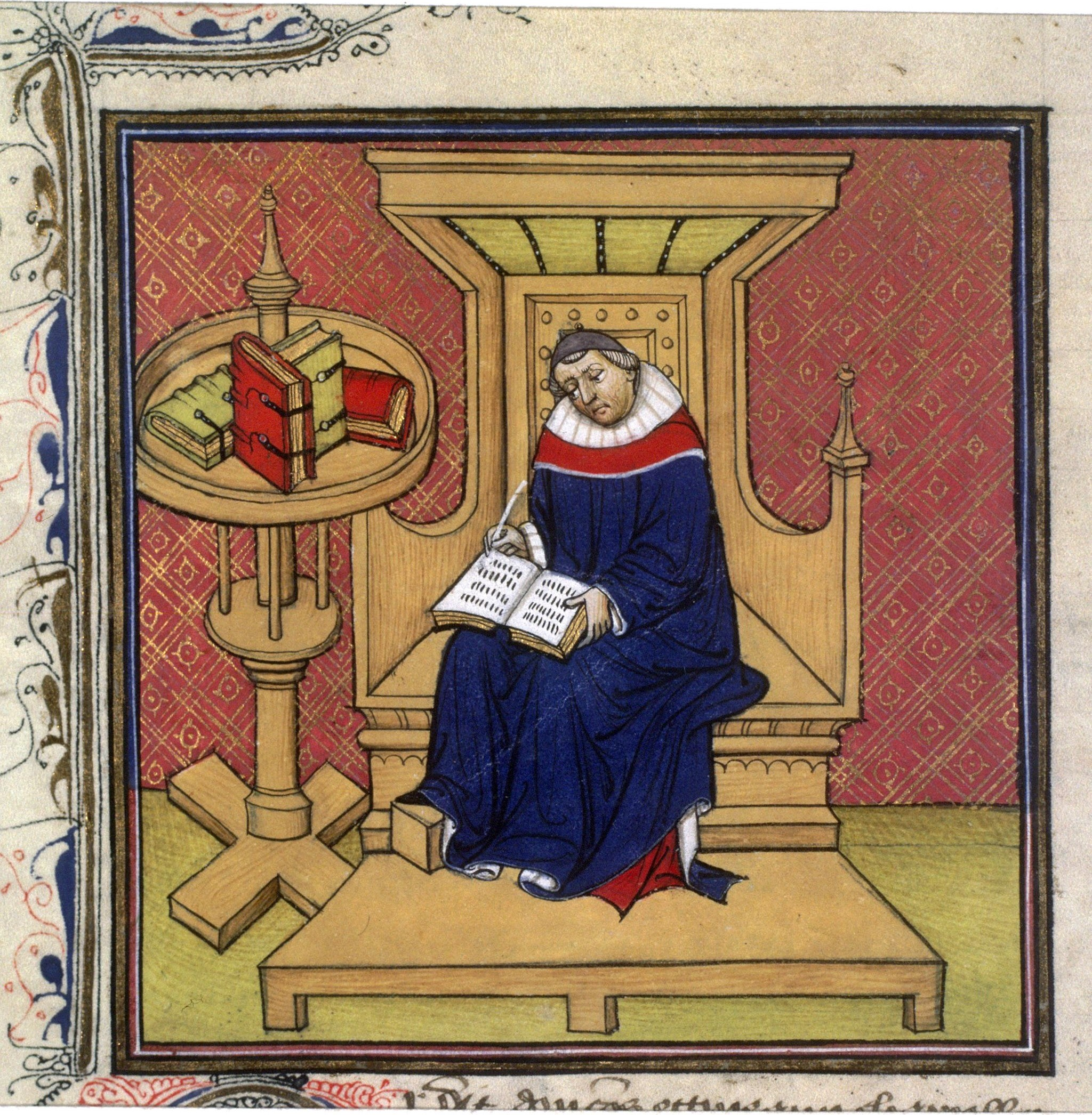
Eginhard, from a 15th-century illuminated manuscript

In the wake of his split from Joséphin Péladan's Rose + Croix sect in August 1892, Satie planned several musical projects he ultimately abandoned or never started. It is not known for what purpose the Prélude d'Eginhard was written. The title suggests it was intended as a piece of incidental music for a play, but no evidence pertaining to this has come to light. The score is undated. In his chronology of Satie's compositions Robert Orledge provisionally places it at the beginning of 1893, when the composer would have been in the first flush of his brief love affair with the painter Suzanne Valadon. Pianist Olof Höjer also found close stylistic links between the prelude and the earlier piano piece Fête donnée par des Chevaliers Normands en l'honneur d'une jeune demoiselle (XIe siecle) (c. 1892), as opposed to the Danses gothiques of March 1893, in which Satie broke up a continuous piece of music into sections by purely literary means.

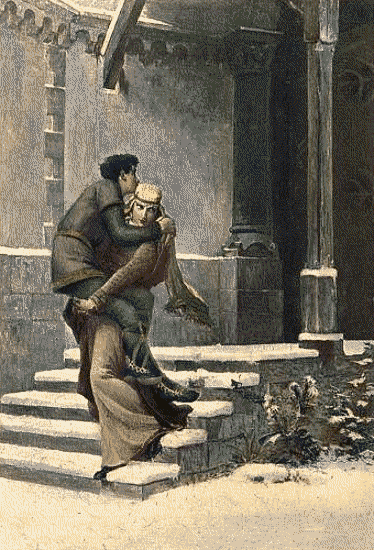
Emma carrying her lover Eginhard across the snow. A 1907 color print after a painting by G. L. P. Saint-Ange

The historical subject of the prelude was certainly germane to Satie's concurrent fascination with the Middle Ages, and contained elements of Medieval legend and romance he would later treat with irony in such works as Geneviève de Brabant (c. 1900) and the Trois poèmes d'amour (1914). "Eginhard" is the French spelling for the name of Einhard, an 8th-century AD Frankish scholar who was an important courtier and first biographer of Charlemagne. A layman and self-professed "barbarian", he built churches to expiate his sins and entrusted much of the management of his estates to his wife Emma. In the 12th century an enduring popular myth arose that Emma was a daughter of Charlemagne and had to conduct her early relationship with Eginhard in secret. During one of their trysts a sudden snowfall made it impossible for Eginhard to escape without leaving telltale footprints, so Emma carried him across the snow on the castle grounds. Charlemagne spotted them from a window, however. Rejecting his counselors' advice that the lovers should be punished, the emperor magnanimously consented to their marriage. This legend gradually spread beyond France and Germany and was still fairly well known in Satie's day. In the United States, Henry Wadsworth Longfellow retold it in verse in his 1863 poetry collection Tales of a Wayside Inn.

Satie's music, played Lent (slow) throughout, roughly conforms to a traditional ABA structure. Four quasi-Gregorian motifs are transposed, inverted and repeated over 24 regular bars. Apart from the title, nothing about the Prélude d'Eginhard suggests a specific program, though its melodic fragments are more attractive and approachable than the remote, almost alien-sounding material found in Satie's radical scores for Le Fils des étoiles (1891) and the ballet Uspud (1892).

Like much of Satie's Rose + Croix-era music, the Prélude d'Eginhard was shelved and forgotten until after the composer's death. His close friend and music executor Darius Milhaud arranged to publish Eginhard along with the two Préludes du Nazaréen (June 1892) and the Fête donnée par des Chevaliers Normands in the posthumous collection Quatre Préludes (1929). Rollo H. Myers, author of the first Satie biography in English (1948), found the piece of little interest, and it remained something of an oddity until the Satie revival of the late 1960s. John Lanchbery orchestrated the Prélude d'Eginhard to serve as an overture for choreographer Frederick Ashton's ballet set to Satie's early music, Monotones (1966), which raised its profile considerably. The original piano version has since had more than a dozen commercial recordings.

== Recordings ==
Aldo Ciccolini (twice for EMI, 1968 and 1988), Frank Glazer (Vox, 1968), Jean-Joël Barbier (Universal Classics France, 1971), Charles Miles (Musical Heritage Society, 1971), Reinbert de Leeuw (Harlekijn, 1975, reissued by Philips, 1980), France Clidat (Forlane, 1984), Ulrich Gumpert (ITM, 1989), Jean-Pierre Armengaud (Circé, 1990), Klára Koermendi (Naxos, 1993), Bojan Gorišek (Audiophile Classics, 1994), Olof Höjer (Swedish Society Discofil, 1996), Jean-Yves Thibaudet (Decca, 2003), Steffen Schleiermacher (MDG, 2002), Cristina Ariagno (Brilliant Classics, 2006), Jeroen van Veen (Brilliant Classics, 2016), Alessandro Simonetto (OnClassical, 2016, 2021, 2025).
