= Fête donnée par des Chevaliers Normands en l'honneur d'une jeune demoiselle (XIe siecle) =

Piano composition by Erik Satie

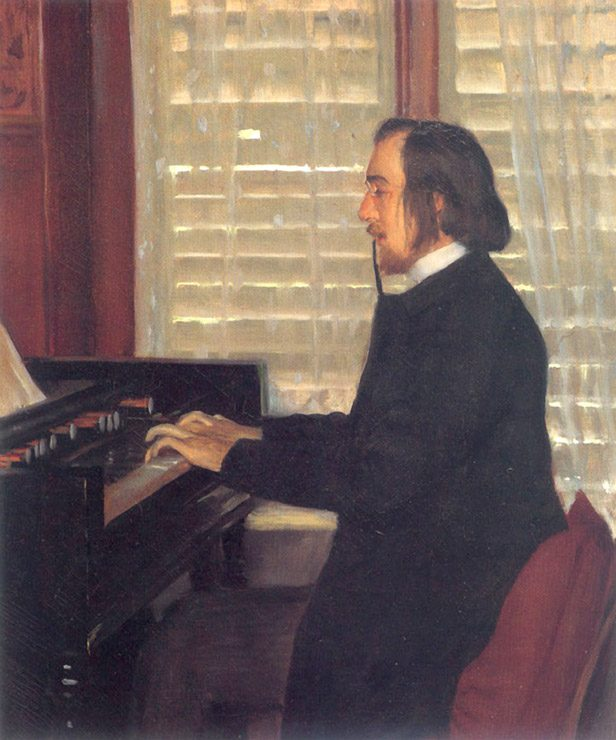
Erik Satie by Santiago Rusiñol, circa 1892

The Fête donnée par des Chevaliers Normands en l'honneur d'une jeune demoiselle (XIe siecle) (Festival Given by Norman Knights in Honor of a Young Lady [11th Century]) is an 1892 piano composition by Erik Satie. An example of his Rosicrucian or "mystic" phase, it was published posthumously in 1929. A typical performance lasts about 4 minutes.

== Description ==
As a student at the Conservatoire de Paris Satie had little patience for academic teaching or conventional musical forms. Not knowing the rules before breaking them laid the groundwork for his originality but also left him with limited technique to realize his ideas. The music of his Rose + Croix period (1891–95) chronicles his search for a sound compositional method of his own, relying on his gifts for harmony and melody. It was a painstaking process. His friend J. P. Contamine de Latour recalled, "He was in the position of a man who knows only thirteen letters of the alphabet and decides to create a new literature using only these, rather than admit his own insufficiency. For sheer bravado, it was unparalleled at the time, but he made it a point of honor to succeed with his system. He admitted to me: 'I have to commit tours de force to get one bar to stand up'".

With the Fête donnee par des Chevaliers Normands Satie used such a compositional system for the first time. The score is undated but internal evidence places it around mid-1892; curiously, it was written on the back of the manuscript for Satie's earliest known piece, the Allegro (1884). This system involves the juxtaposition of 13 harmonic cells divided into categories determined by whether the melodic line rises or falls; some are called "terminations" and "points of rest". Patrick Gowers dubbed this "punctuation form". None of the cells are finite and are open to transposition and repetition, even into other compositions. Pianist Olof Hojer found stylistic similarities between this piece and another Satie work on a Middle Ages theme, the Prélude d'Eginhard (1893), while Robert Orledge observed that some of its same chord progressions can be found in the ballet Uspud (1892) and the Danses gothiques for piano (1893).

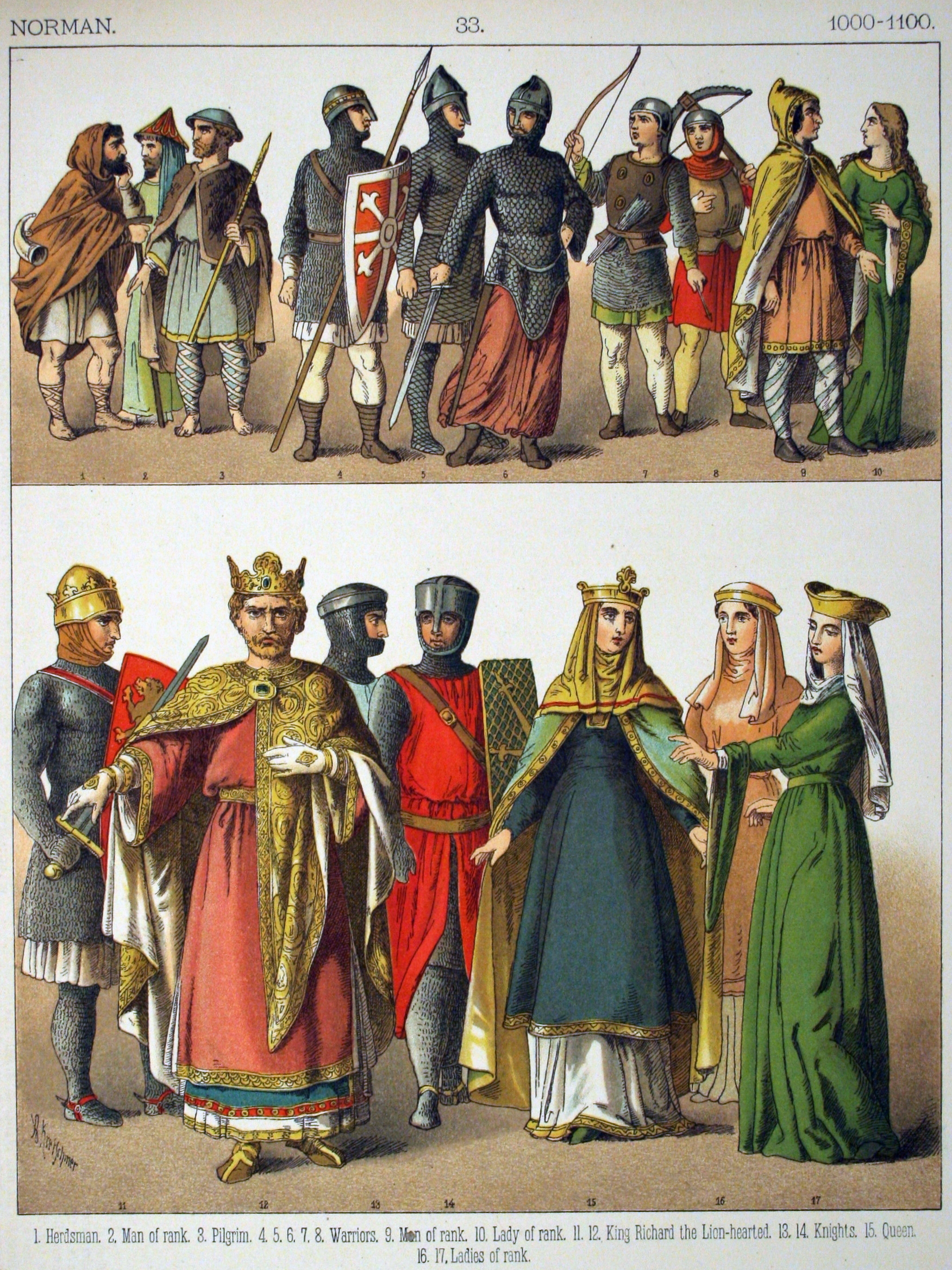
Bottom panel: 11th Century Norman Royal Court, with Knights and Ladies of Rank

Despite its organizational scheme the piece shares the same sound world as the rest of the Rose + Croix works. It is a ceremonial procession of plainsong-like melodic fragments, characteristically slow in tempo (Lent), and with a measured tone of otherworldly detachment. No drama or virtuosity, nothing resembling mainstream musical trends in France during the early 1890s. Satie further flipped the clichés of Romantic music by putting the "program" into the lengthy title, which reflected his Norman roots and fascination with things Medieval.

Like a number of Satie's compositions, the existence of the Fête donnee par des Chevaliers Normands was not discovered until after his death in 1925. His close friend and music executor Darius Milhaud arranged to publish it along with the two Préludes du Nazaréen (1892) and the Prélude d'Eginhard in the collection Quatre Préludes (1929). Another Satie disciple, Francis Poulenc, orchestrated the piece in 1939 and made the first recording of the original piano version in 1950.

== Recordings ==
For piano:

Francis Poulenc (Columbia, 1950), Jean-Joël Barbier (BAM, 1967), Aldo Ciccolini (twice, for Angel in 1968 and EMI in 1987), Frank Glazer (Vox, 1968, reissued 1990), France Clidat (Forlane, 1980), Reinbert de Leeuw (Philips, 1986), Jean-Pierre Armengaud (Le Chant du Monde, 1986), Klára Körmendi (Naxos Records, 1994), Bojan Gorišek (Audiophile Classics, 1994), Olof Höjer (Swedish Society Discofil, 1996), Jean-Yves Thibaudet (Decca, 2003), Håkon Austbø (Brilliant Classics, 2006), Cristina Ariagno (Brilliant Classics, 2007), Ulrich Gumpert (Phil.harmonie, 2013), Jeroen van Veen (Brilliant Classics, 2016), Nicolas Horvath (Grand Piano, 2018), Steffen Schleiermacher (MDG, 2021).

For orchestra (arr. Poulenc):

Maurice Abravanel, The Utah Symphony Orchestra (Vanguard, 1968); Charles Dutoit, Orchestre National de France (London, 1999).
