= Matthias M. Tischler =

German palaeographer, philologist and historian

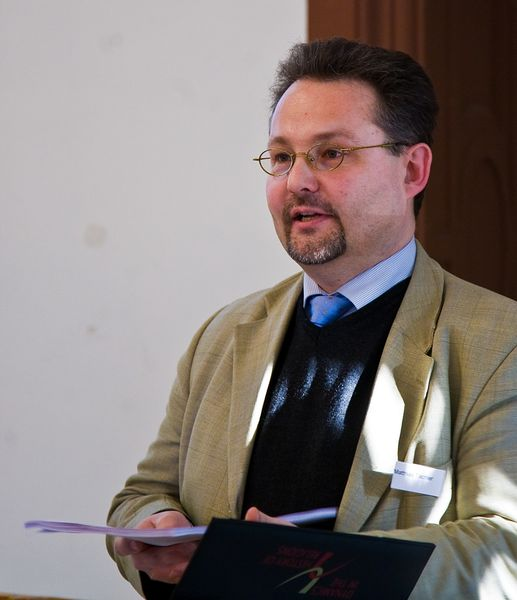
Matthias M. Tischler in 2011

Matthias Martin Tischler (born March 18, 1968, in Münchberg, Bavaria) is a German palaeographer, philologist and historian.

== Academic studies ==
Tischler studied classical philology and medieval Latin, medieval and modern history, applied historical sciences and Romance philology at Heidelberg University and LMU Munich (1989–1995). After completing his PhD at Heidelberg University in 1998, he became a post-graduate fellow at the German Historical Institute Paris (1998–1999) and at the University of Bamberg (1999–2001), and a scientific assistant, collaborator and lecturer at the Hugo von Sankt Viktor-Institut in Frankfurt and the Goethe University Frankfurt (2001–2009). While in Frankfurt, he studied philosophy and theology (2001–2009) with Rainer Berndt, and Islam and Christian-Muslim Encounters (2003–2005) with Christian Troll.

== Professional career ==
After his Dresden habilitation in 2009, he was an associate professor of medieval and transcultural history at TU Dresden until 2012. Since 2013, he has been a research professor of transcultural medieval history at the Institut d'Estudis Medievals (IEM) of the Autonomous University of Barcelona (UAB). In the academic year 2014/2015, he was visiting professor at the École Pratique des Hautes Études in Paris. In the academic year 2015/2016, he was visiting fellow at the Medieval Institute of the University of Notre Dame, Indiana. In 2016, he accepted the position of a Senior Research Professor of the Catalan Institution for Research and Advanced Studies, Barcelona. In the spring term 2019, he was a short-term visiting fellow of the Institute for Advanced Study, Princeton. In January 2020, he was a senior research fellow at the Herzog August Bibliothek in Wolfenbüttel and in November 2024/February 2025 a senior research fellow at the DFG Center for Advanced Studies "Migration and Mobility in Late Antiquity and the Early Middle Ages" at the University of Tübingen. Since spring 2024, he has been a guest professor for research at TU Dresden. Since summer 2020, he has been an elected member of the Academia Europaea.

== Projects ==
- In March 2014, he has been installed as the official editor of the new critical edition of Einhart's Vita Karoli, which will be published by the Monumenta Germaniae Historica in Munich. From May 2015 to April 2019, he co-directed (together with Walter Pohl) the FWF project "Bible and Historiography in Transcultural Iberian Societies, 8th to 12th Centuries" at the Austrian Academy of Sciences, Vienna.
- Since 2015, he is responsible for the Latin section of the Corpus Biblicum Catalanicum, Barcelona.
- From September 2016 to August 2019, he was one of the co-directors of the HERA-project "After Empire: Using and Not Using the Past in the Crisis of the Carolingian World, c.900‒c.1050" (UNUP).
- Since December 2019, he is director of the four-years project "Preaching Christ from a Transcultural Standpoint" which is preparing the critical edition of the Homiliary of Luculentius, the oldest indigenous work of Carolingian text culture in early medieval Catalonia (ca. 900).
- From September 2020 to August 2024, he co-directed (together with Walter Pohl) the four-years FWF-Project "Carolingian Culture in Septimania and Catalonia: The Transformation of a Multi-Ethnic Middle Ground of the Euro-Mediterranean World".

== Scientific activities ==
Tischler is the founder and editor-in-chief of the Journal of Transcultural Medieval Studies (JTMS), published by de Gruyter (Berlin - Munich - Boston) since 2014, which has been transformed into the Series Transcultural Medieval Studies, published by Brepols (Turnhout) from 2019 onwards.

Tischler has also been a scientific consultant in the preparation of several historical exhibitions, such as "Kaiser Heinrich II.", Bamberg, July 9 – Oktober 20, 2002; "Canossa 1077. Erschütterung der Welt. Geschichte, Kunst und Kultur am Aufgang der Romanik", Paderborn, July 21 – November 5, 2006).

== Philanthropy ==
In September 2013, Tischler initiated the donation of the private library of the German philosopher Kurt Hübner (1921–2013) to the Autonomous University of Barcelona (UAB). In November 2019, he has initiated an official exchange of publications (journals, book series) between the Institut d'Estudis Medievals (IEM) of the Autonomous University of Barcelona (UAB) and the Forschungsstelle für vergleichende Ordensgeschichte (FOVOG) of TU Dresden. In May 2023, Tischler, with Alexander Fidora, acquired a special book collection on Islamic thought, Arabic philosophy, and Ramon Llull owned by the German Arabist Hans Daiber for the Autonomous University of Barcelona.

== Main publications ==
- Einharts Vita Karoli. Studien zur Entstehung, Überlieferung und Rezeption (MGH. Schriften 48, I–II), Hanover 2001 ISBN 3-7752-5448-X.(in German)
- Die Christus- und Engelweihe im Mittelalter. Texte, Bilder und Studien zu einem ekklesiologischen Erzählmotiv (Erudiri Sapientia. Studien zum Mittelalter und zu seiner Rezeptionsgeschichte 5), Berlin 2005 ISBN 3-05-004075-0.(in German)
- (with Alexander Fidora) Christlicher Norden – Muslimischer Süden. Ansprüche und Wirklichkeiten von Christen, Juden und Muslimen auf der Iberischen Halbinsel im Hoch- und Spätmittelalter (Erudiri Sapientia. Studien zum Mittelalter und zu seiner Rezeptionsgeschichte 7), Munster/W. 2011 ISBN 978-3-402-10427-9.(in German)
- (with Michael Borgolte) Transkulturelle Verflechtungen im mittelalterlichen Jahrtausend. Europa, Ostasien, Afrika, Darmstadt 2012 ISBN 978-3-534-24487-4.(in German)
- Die Bibel in Saint-Victor zu Paris. Das Buch der Bücher als Gradmesser für wissenschaftliche, soziale und ordensgeschichtliche Umbrüche im europäischen Hoch- und Spätmittelalter (Corpus Victorinum. Instrumenta 6), Munster/W. 2014 ISBN 978-3-402-10433-0.(in German)
- (with Hanns Peter Neuheuser and Ralf M. W. Stammberger), Diligens scrutator sacri eloquii. Beiträge zur Exegese- und Theologiegeschichte des Mittelalters. Festgabe für Rainer Berndt SJ zum 65. Geburtstag (Archa Verbi. Subsidia 14), Munster/W. 2016 ISBN 978-3-402-10233-6.(in German)
- (with Patrick S. Marschner), Transcultural Approaches to the Bible: Exegesis and Historical Writing across Medieval Worlds (Transcultural Medieval Studies 1), Turnhout 2021 ISBN 978-2-503-59285-5.(in English)
- After the Carolingians: Catalonia and Europe in Transformation [= Early Medieval Europe 30, 4 (2022)], London et al. 2022 ISSN 0963-9462.(in English)
- Carlemany a Europa: història i memòria (Filologia UB), Barcelona 2022 ISBN 978-84-9168-896-9.(in Catalan)
