= Germigny-des-Prés =

- Commune
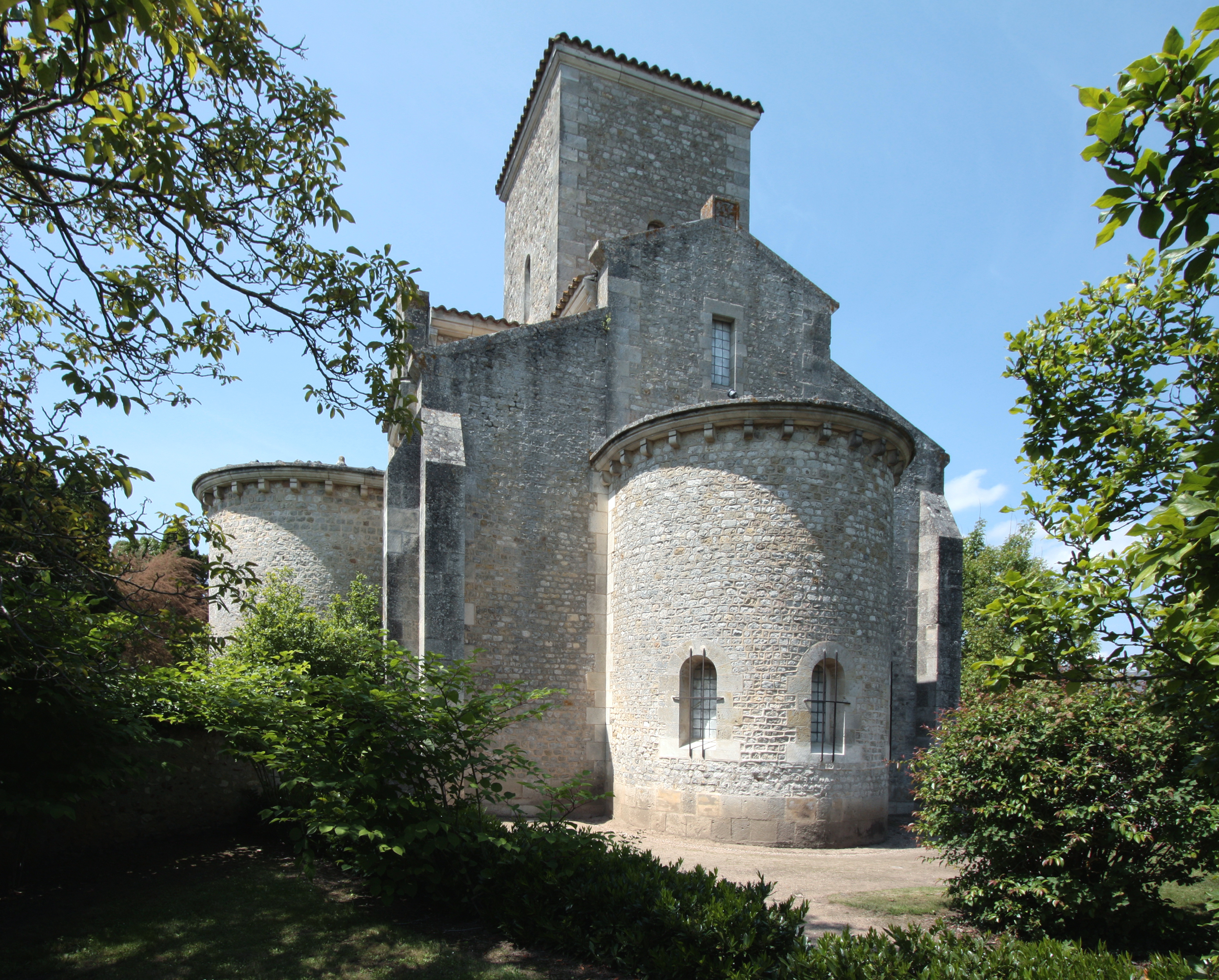
- The church in Germigny-des-Prés

- Coat of arms
- Location of Germigny-des-Prés
- Location within France Location within Centre-Val de Loire
- Coordinates: 47°50′45″N 2°18′00″E
- Country: France
- Region: Centre-Val de Loire
- Department: Loiret
- Arrondissement: Orléans
- Canton: Sully-sur-Loire
- Intercommunality: Val de Sully

Government
  - Mayor (2020–2026): Philippe Thuillier
- Area^{1}: 9.78 km^{2} (3.78 sq mi)
- Highest elevation: 112 m (367 ft)
- Lowest elevation: 102 m (335 ft)
- Population (2023): 696
  - Density: 71.2/km^{2} (184/sq mi)
- Demonym: Germignons
- Time zone: UTC+01:00 (CET)
  - Summer (DST): UTC+02:00 (CEST)
- INSEE/Postal code: 45153 /45110
- ^{1} French Land Register data, which excludes lakes, ponds, glaciers > 1 km^{2} (0.386 sq mi or 247 acres) and river estuaries.

Germigny-des-Prés (French pronunciation: [ʒɛʁmiɲi de pʁe]) is a commune in the Loiret department in north-central France.

== The Oratory ==
The oratory at Germigny-des-Prés (Loiret, Orléanais) was built by Bishop Theodulf of Orléans in 806 as part of his palace complex within the Gallo-Roman villa in Germaniacus. Theodulf, who was also abbot of the neighboring monastery of Saint-Benoît-sur-Loire, was a Spaniard and one of the most celebrated men of letters in the Carolingian Empire court of Charlemagne. The Carolingian architecture of his palace complex at Germigny-des-Prés was in a general sense modelled on Charlemagne's Palace of Aachen. All except the oratory was destroyed by the Vikings within a century of construction.

As reconstructed by Theodulf in 806, the oratory took the form of a rough square with single apses in the middle of the north, south, and west sides, and three apses on the east side. Internally, the space took the form of a Greek cross: a high central tower filled the central bay, barrel vaults extended off in the north, south, east, and west bays, while in the corner bays there were low domes carried on squinches. This plan type was later to become standard in Byzantine architecture.

Horseshoe arches are used throughout the church, an unusual element in French architecture derived, in this case, from the Visigothic practices of Theodulf's native Spain. The central apse of the east contains a rich and complex mosaic showing two cherubim above the Ark of the Covenant. Below his mosaic, Theodulf placed an inscription that occupies two lines:

As you gaze upon the holy propitiatorium and Cherubim, beholder,
And see the shimmering of the Ark of God's covenant,
Perceiving these things, and prepared to beset the Thunderer with prayers,
Add, I beg you, Theodulf's name to your invocations.'

=== History ===
Odo of Metz, an Armenian architect, built the Germigny des Prés in 806–811. According to Josef Strzygowski and Alexander Sahinian, the church was possibly influenced by the Etchmiadzin Cathedral, the mother church of Armenia.

The church was consecrated on 3 January 806, dedicated to SS.Geneviève and Germain. Damaged by fire before 854, it became part of a priory in 1067, and a parish church in the 13th century. The original circular plan was augmented with a nave in the 15-16th century, which involved the demolition of the Western abside. The nave was extended to the west in the 19th century, and a bell-tower erected. The church was classified as a monument historique in 1840 and restoration commenced in 1867.

The most ancient part of the existing church is the square building which surrounds the altar. Although often referred to as a 'Greek Cross' church, this building does not really fall into this category, as it has no projecting 'arms' or transepts, only a single apse on three sides, and a triple apse to the 'east' (the church is not aligned to the compass points). The triple apse would not appear to have been mirrored to the 'west' where the entrance was and is to be found, subsequent alteration has made it impossible to determine whether there was originally a narthex.

The church is also architecturally quite distinct from the Palatine chapel in Aachen, and from S. Vitale in Ravenna – two buildings upon which it is often claimed that SS.Geneviève & Germain is modelled – in that it is square rather than round, has exterior apses and is constructed differently. This is rather a rare survival of a very early form of Western European church, pre-dating and perhaps contributing to the development of the Romanesque which forms the majority of ancient churches in France and, indeed, in Western Europe.

The great treasure of the church is the mosaic of the Ark of the Covenant, on the ceiling of the apse. This mosaic is the only surviving Byzantine mosaic in France, although traces of mosaics elsewhere on the roof indicate that it was part of a wider decorative scheme. The mosaic owes its preservation to being plastered over at the time of the French Revolution; it was rediscovered in the middle of the 19th century. The mosaic is one of the few remaining artworks from the period of the Iconoclasm which convulsed the Eastern Church during the 8th & 9th centuries, but which also impacted on Western Christendom. Traditionally, the place occupied by this mosaic was reserved for images of the Virgin Mary, enthroned as Queen Of Heaven, with the Christ child on her knee, and with an attendant angel on either side. These angels pointed out the divine status of the figures between them.

The artist working at Germigny (who was obviously au fait with Byzantine practice, if not actually Greek himself) has replaced the portrait of the Virgin, Mother of Christ, with an equivalent but symbolic representation. The Ark of the Covenant contains ‘manna’, the miraculous bread given from Heaven to the Israelites in the desert; this was interpreted as a prefiguration of the Virgin, who bears Christ, the Holy Bread. The mosaicist, and Théodulf d'Orléans, seem to have held a middle course, balanced between extreme iconoclasm and the partisans of images such as John of Damascus. This moderate position is exactly that which the theologians appointed by Charlemagne in the Council of Frankfurt (794) decided upon.

== See also ==
- Carolingian art
- Carolingian Renaissance
- Early medieval domes
