= Palace of Aachen =

Residence of Charlemagne from ca. 790 -814

Coordinates: 50°46′32″N 6°05′02″E

Possible reconstruction of the Palace of Aachen, as built in the 790s. At the back is the Palatine Chapel, today the rotunda of Aachen Cathedral, in the foreground the aula regia (on the site of today's Aachen Town Hall, with the tower still standing). On the left the imperial bath spa.

The Palace of Aachen was a group of buildings with residential, political, and religious purposes chosen by Charlemagne to be the center of power of the Carolingian Empire. The palace was located in the heart of the current city of Aachen, today in the German Land (or state) of North Rhine-Westphalia. Most of the Carolingian palace was built in the 790s but the works went on until Charlemagne's death in 814. The plans, drawn by Odo of Metz, were part of the program of renovation of the kingdom decided by the ruler. The Palatine Chapel that was part of the palace complex has been preserved and is considered a masterpiece of Carolingian architecture and a characteristic example of architecture from the Carolingian Renaissance. Also, the foundations and lower walls of the Aula Regia (council hall) are preserved in the current town hall as are the first three stories of its square tower (so-called Granus Tower).

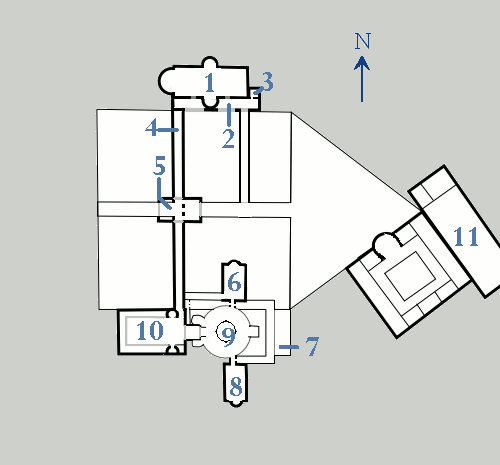
Simplified plan: 1 = council hall; 2 = porch; 3 = treasury and archives; 4 = gallery; 5 = tribunal and garrison; 6 = metatorium; 7 = curia; 8 = secretarium; 9 = chapel; 10 = atrium; 11 = thermae

== Historical context ==
=== The palace before Charlemagne ===
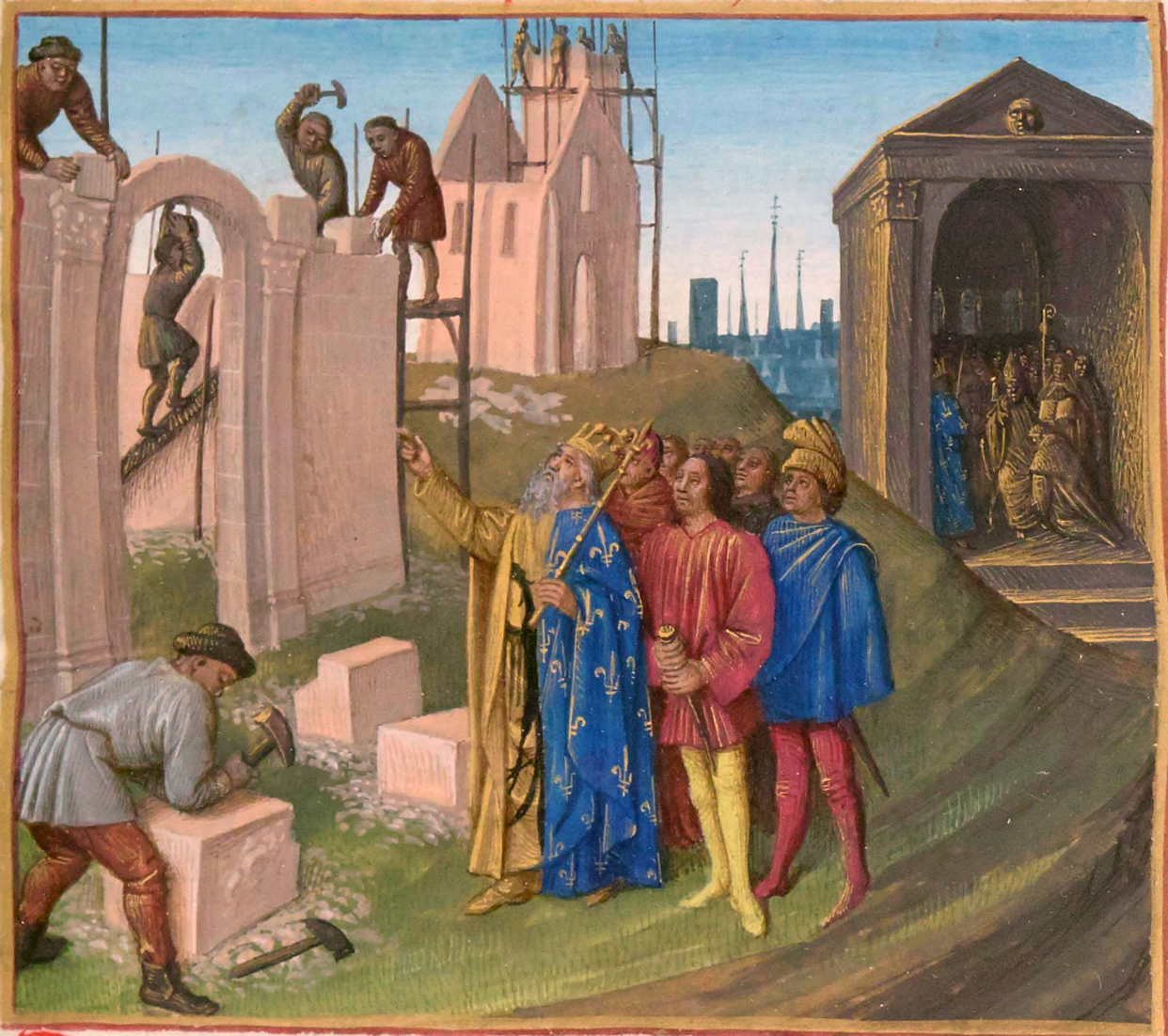
The construction of Aachen, illumination by Jean Fouquet, in the Grandes Chroniques de France, 15th century. Charlemagne is in the foreground.

In ancient times, the Romans chose the site of Aachen for its thermal springs and its forward position towards Germania. The site, called Aquae Granni, was equipped with 50 acres (20 ha) of thermae that remained in use from the 1st to the 4th century. The Roman city grew in connection with the thermae according to a classical grid plan similar to that of Roman legionary camps. A palace was used to accommodate the governor of the province or the Emperor. In the 4th century, the city and the palace were destroyed during the Barbarian invasions. Clovis made Paris the capital of the Frankish Kingdom, and Aachen Palace was abandoned until the advent of the Carolingian dynasty. The Pippinid Mayors of the Palace carried out some restoration works, but it was at the time only one residence among others. The Frankish court was itinerant and the rulers moved according to the circumstances. Around 765, Pepin the Short had a palace erected over the remains of the old Roman building; he had the thermae restored and removed its pagan idols. As soon as he came to power in 768, Charlemagne spent time in Aachen as well as in other villas in Austrasia. In the 790s, he decided to settle down in order to govern first his kingdom, then his empire, more efficiently.

=== The choice of Aachen ===
The site of Aachen was chosen by Charlemagne after careful consideration in a key moment of his reign. Since his advent as King of the Franks, Charlemagne had led numerous military expeditions that had both filled his treasury and enlarged his realm, most notably towards the East. He conquered pagan Saxony in 772–780, but this area resisted and the war with the Saxons lasted for about thirty years. Charlemagne ended the Germanic custom of an itinerant court moving from place to place and established a permanent capital. As he was ageing, he decreased the frequency of military expeditions and, after 806, virtually did not leave Aachen.

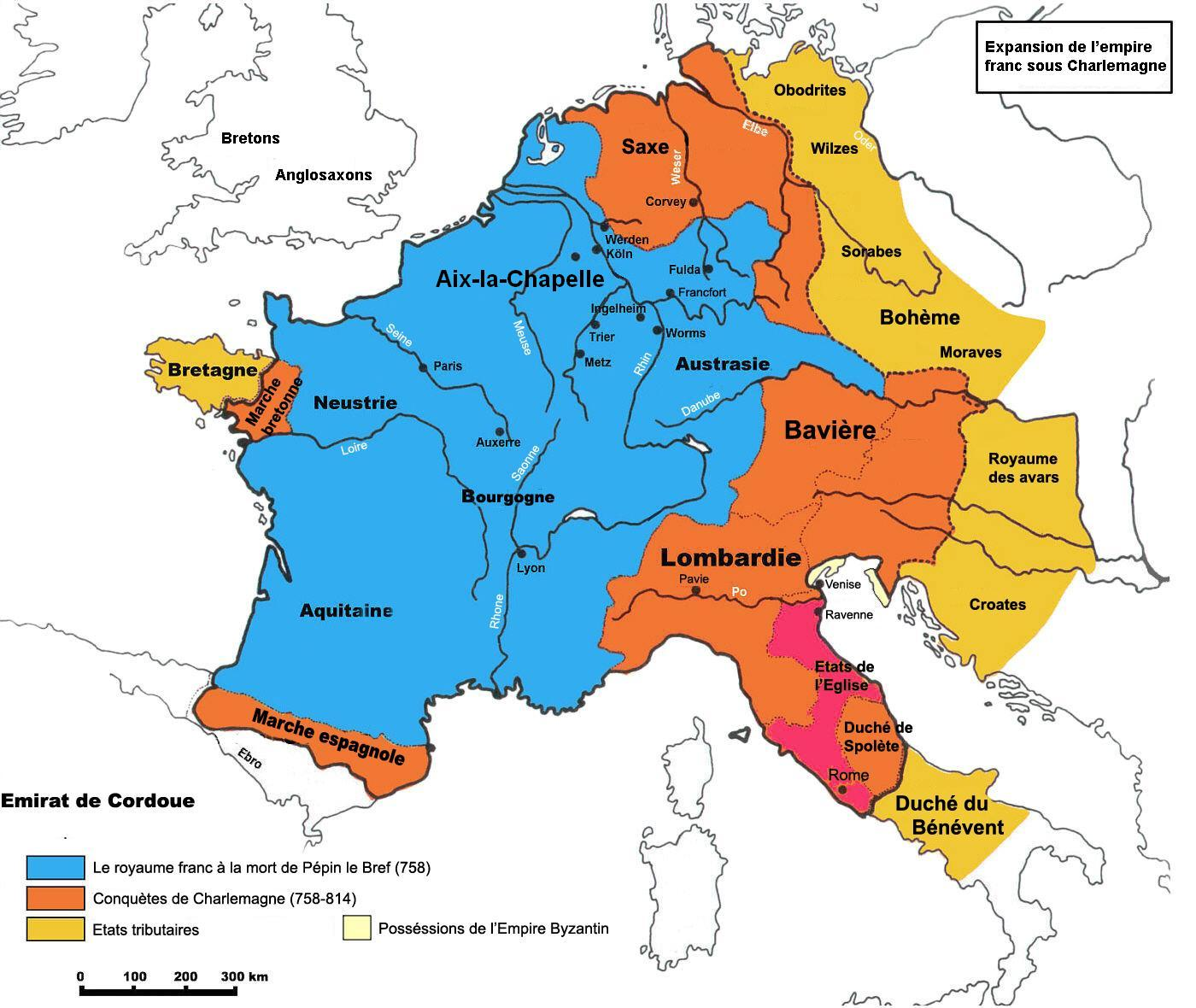
Carolingian Empire and its capital, Aachen, in the early 9th century.

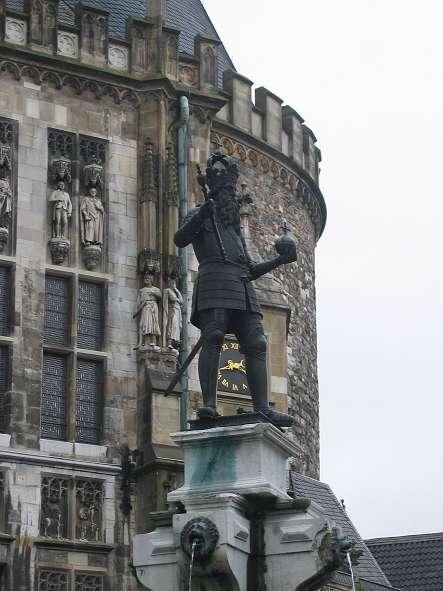
Statue of Charlemagne in front of Aachen's city hall

Aachen's geographic location was a decisive factor in Charlemagne's choice: the site was situated in the Carolingian heartlands of Austrasia, the cradle of his family, East of the Meuse river, at a crossroads of land roads and on a tributary of the Rur, called the Wurm. From then, Charlemagne left the administration of the Southern regions to his son Louis, named King of Aquitaine, which enabled him to reside in the North.

Besides, settling down in Aachen enabled Charlemagne to control the operations in Saxony from a closer position. Charlemagne also considered other advantages of the place: surrounded with forest abounding in game, he intended to abandon himself to hunting in the area. The ageing emperor could also benefit from Aachen's hot springs.

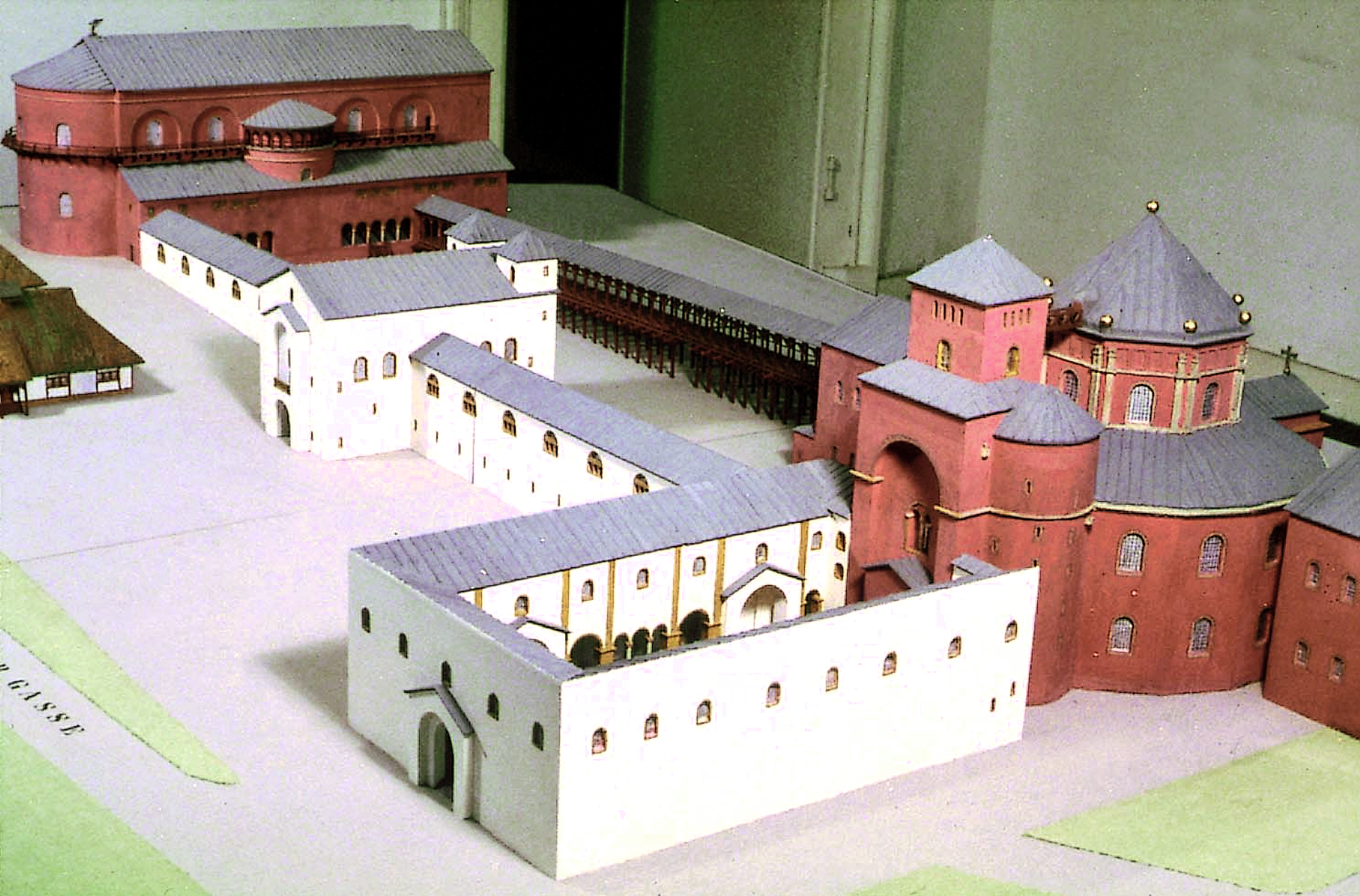
Model of the Palace of Aachen

The scholars of the Carolingian era presented Charlemagne as the "New Constantine"; in this context, he needed a capital and a palace worthy of the name. He left Rome to the Pope. The rivalry with the Byzantine Empire led Charlemagne to build a magnificent palace. The fire that destroyed his palace in Worms in 793 also encouraged him to follow such a plan.

=== Importance of the project entrusted to Odo of Metz ===
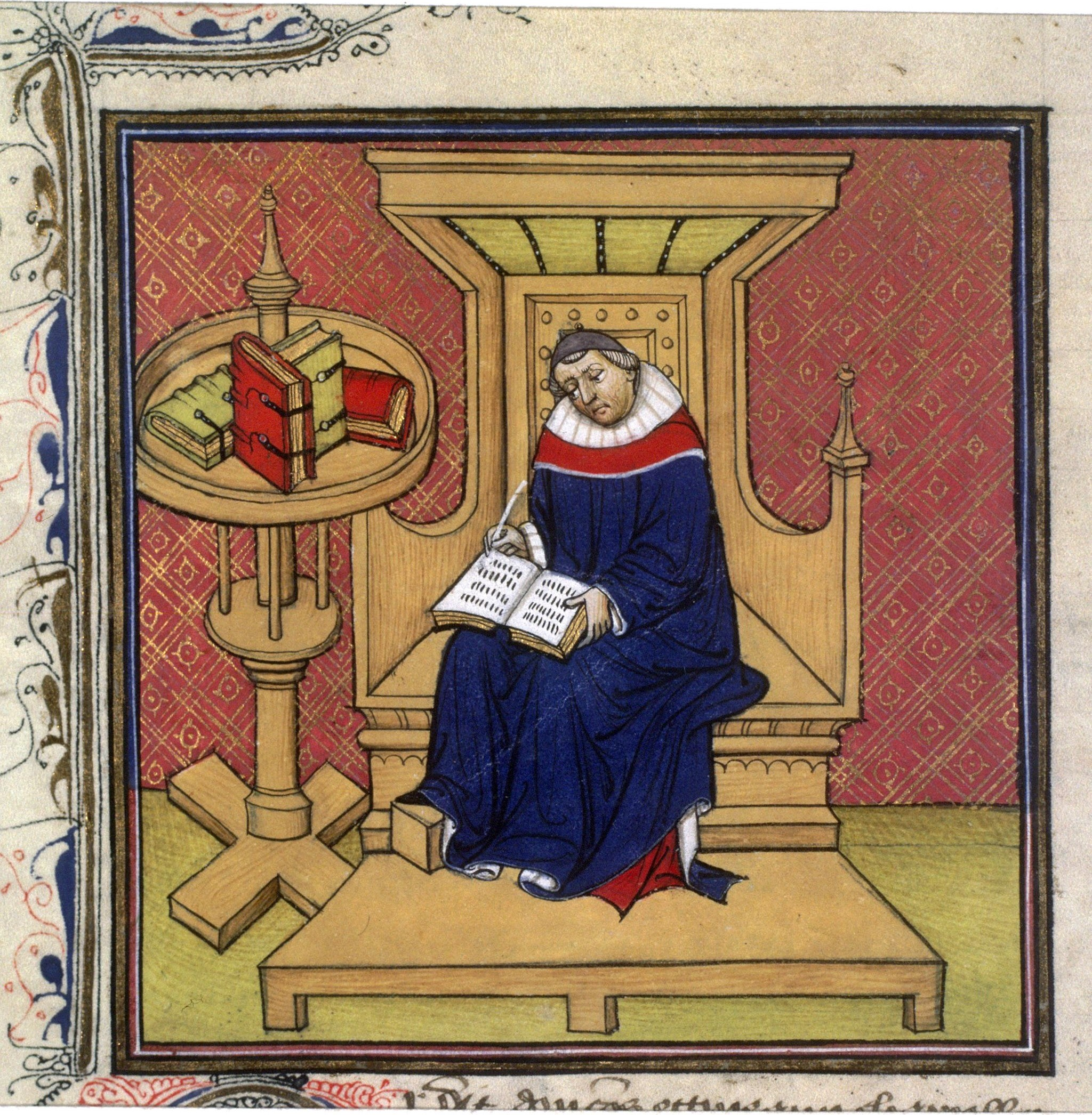
Eginhard is Charlemagne's biographer; the name of the architect of the Palace of Aachen is known thanks to his work (14th/15th-century illumination)

Historians know almost nothing about the architect of the Palace of Aachen, Odo of Metz. His name appears in the works of Eginhard (c. 775–840), Charlemagne's biographer. He is supposed to have been an educated cleric, familiar with liberal arts, especially quadrivia. He had probably read Vitruvius' treatise on architecture, De Architectura.

The decision to build the palace was taken in the late 780s or the early 790s, before Charlemagne held the title of emperor. Works began in 794 and went on for several years. Aachen quickly became the favourite residence of the sovereign. After 807, he almost did not leave it any more. In the absence of sufficient documentation, it is impossible to know the number of workers employed, but the dimensions of the building make it probable that there were many of them.

The geometry of the plan chosen was very simple: Odo of Metz decided to keep the layout of the Roman roads and inscribe the square in 360 Carolingian feet, or 120 metres-side square. The square enclosed an area of 50 acres divided in four parts by a North-South axis (the stone gallery) and an East-West axis (the former Roman road, the decumanus). To the north of this square lay the council hall, to the south the Palatine Chapel. The architect drew a triangle toward the East to connect the thermae to the palace complex. The two best-known buildings are the council hall (today disappeared) and the Palatine Chapel, included into the Cathedral. The other buildings are hardly identified. Often built in timber framing, made of wood and brick, they have been destroyed. Lastly, the palace complex was surrounded with a wall.

The arrival of the court in Aachen and the construction work stimulated the activity in the city that experienced growth in the late 8th century and the early 9th century, as craftsmen, traders and shopkeepers had settled near the court. Some important ones lived in houses inside the city. The members of the Palace Academy and Charlemagne's advisors such as Eginhard and Angilbert owned houses near the palace.

== Council Hall ==
Location of the hall within the Palace (red)

Located at the north of the Palace complex, the great Council Hall (aula regia in Latin) was the venue for the Emperor's annual speech. The highest dignitaries in the Carolingian Empire gathered for this occasion: officials, counts and other feudal vassals of the emperor, and bishops and abbots. This general assembly was usually held in May. Participants discussed important political and legal affairs. Capitularies, written by amanuenses of the Aachen chancellery, summed up the decisions taken. Official ceremonies and the reception of embassies also took place in this building. Describing the coronation of Louis, son of Charlemagne, Ermold the Black wrote that Charlemagne "spoke down from his golden seat" in the Council Hall.

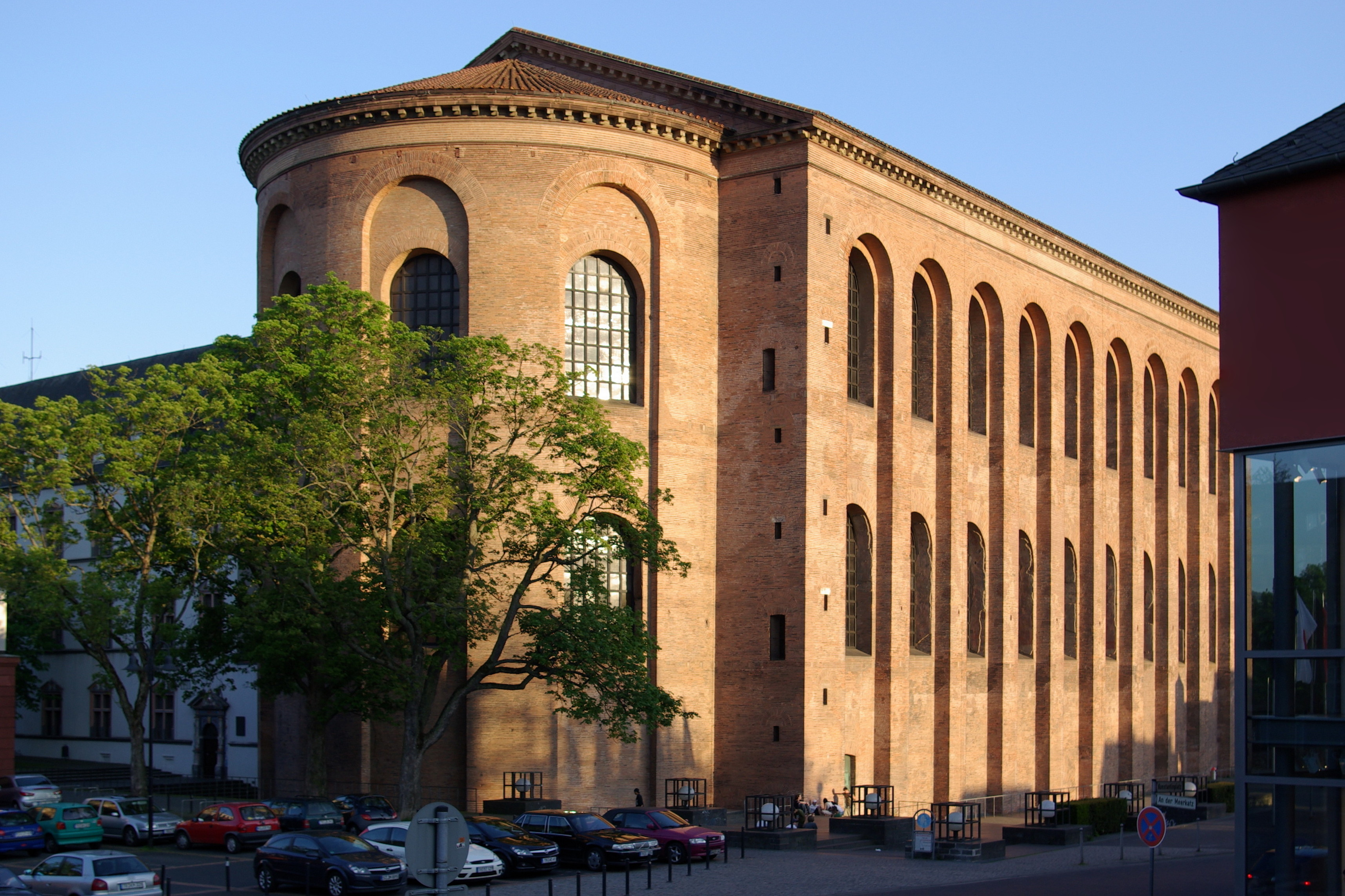
The Constantine Basilica in Trier, Germany was probably used as a model for Aachen's Council Hall

The size of the hall (1,000 m^{2}) was suitable to the reception of several hundred people at the same time: although the building has been destroyed, it is known it was 47.42 metres long, 20.76 metres large and 21 metres high. The plan seems to be based upon the Roman Aula Palatina of Trier. The structure was made of brick, and the shape was that of a civil basilica with three apses: the largest one (17.2 m), located to the west, was dedicated to the king and his suite. The two other apses, to the north and south, were smaller. Light entered through two rows of windows. The inside was probably decorated with paintings depicting heroes both ancient and contemporary. A wooden gallery girdled the building between the two rows of windows. The market north of the Palace could be seen from this gallery. A gallery with porticos on the southern side of the hall gave access to the building. The southern apse cut through the middle of this entrance.

== Palatine Chapel ==
=== Description ===
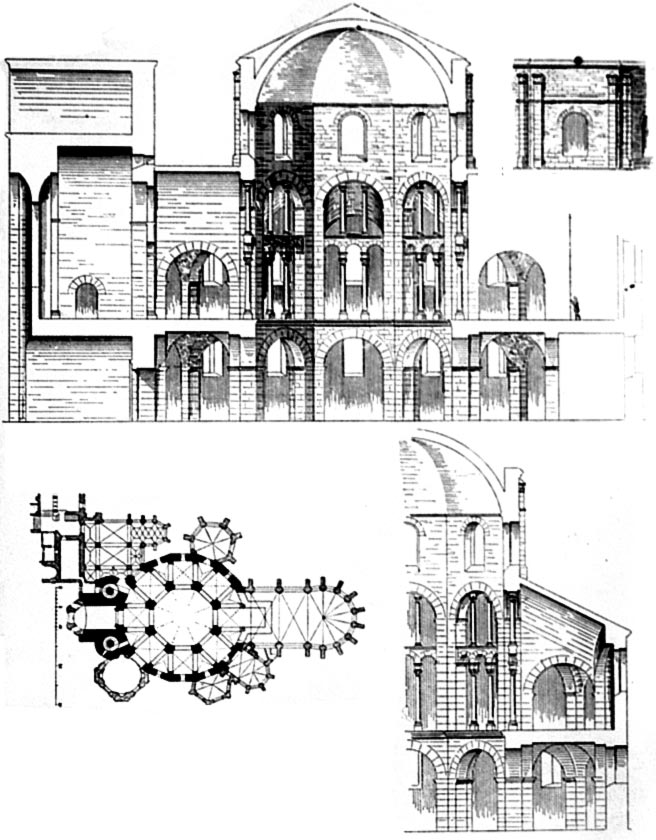
Section of the Palatine Chapel

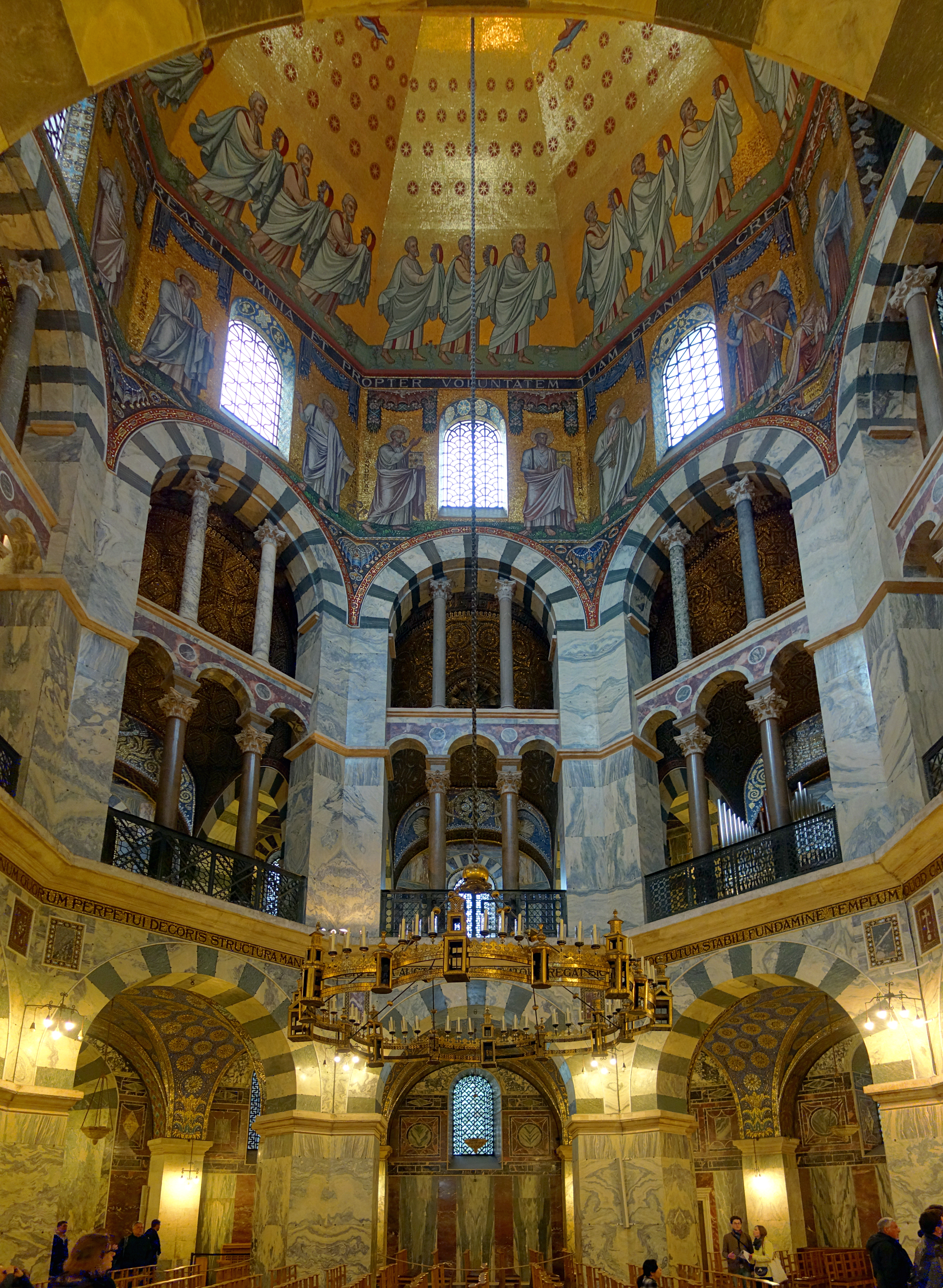
Interior of the Palatine Chapel

The Palatine Chapel was located at the other side of the palace complex, at the South. A stone gallery linked it to the aula regia. It symbolized another aspect of Charlemagne's power, religious power. Legend has it that the building was consecrated in 805 by Pope Leo III, in honour of the Virgin Mary, Mother of Christ.

Several buildings used by the clerics of the chapel were arranged in the shape of a latin cross: a curia in the East, offices in the North and South, and a projecting part (Westbau) and an atrium with exedrae in the West. But the center piece was the chapel, covered with a 16,54 meters wide and 31 meters high octagonal cupola. Eight massive pillars receive the thrust of large arcades. The nave on the first floor, located under the cupola, is surrounded by an aisle; here stood the Palace servants.

The two additional floors (tribunes) open on the central space through semicircular arches supported by columns. The inner side takes the shape of an octagon whereas the outer side develops into a sixteen-sided polygon. The chapel had two choirs located in the East and West. The king sat on a throne made of white marble plates, in the West of the second floor, surrounded by his closer courtiers. Thus he had a view on the three altars: that of the Savior right in front of him, that of the Virgin Mary on the first floor and that of Saint Peter in the far end of the Western choir.

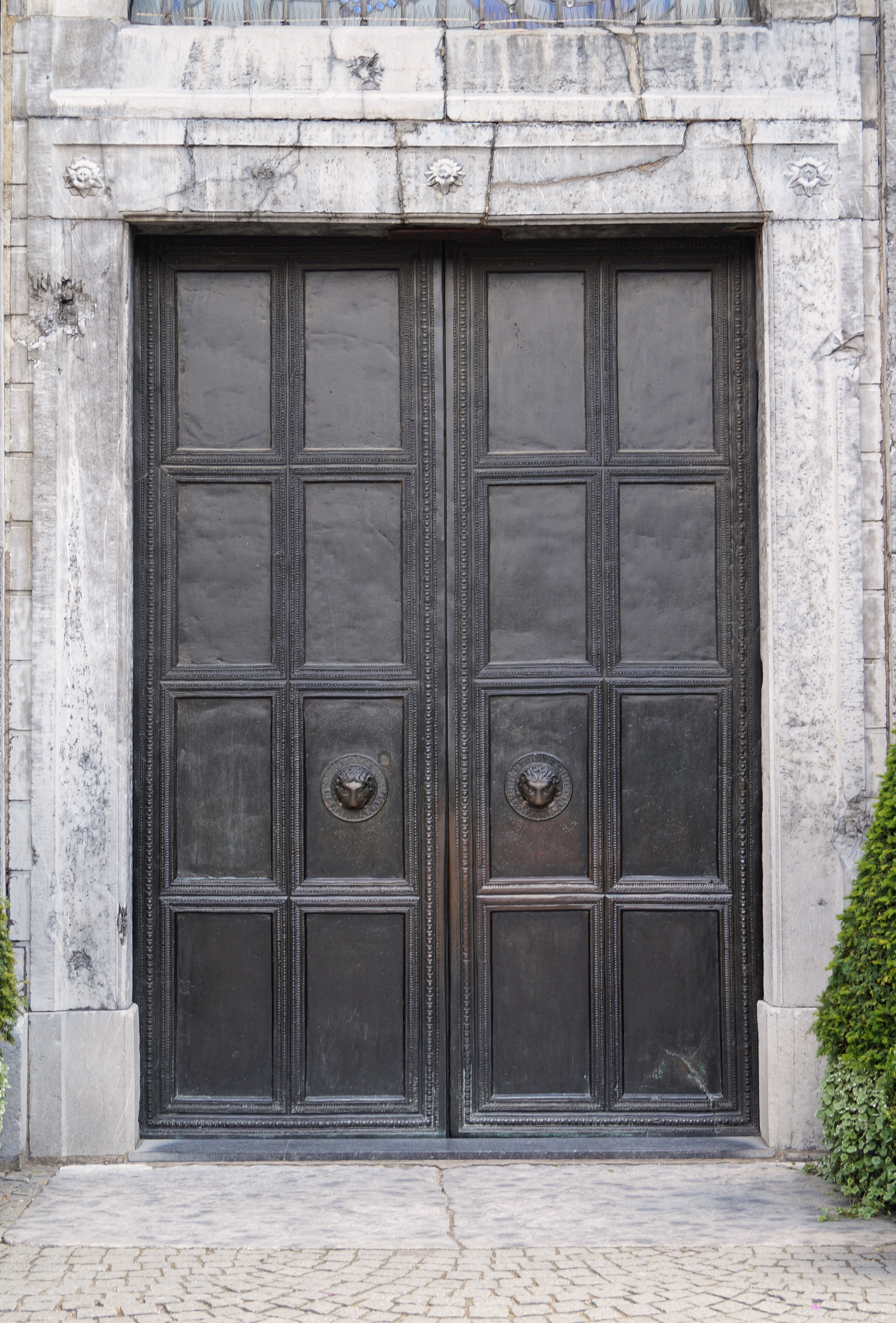
Bronze portal (Wolfstür)

Charlemagne wanted his chapel to be magnificently decorated, so he had massive bronze doors made in a foundry near Aachen. The walls were covered with marble and polychrome stone. The columns, still visible today, were taken from buildings in Ravenna and Rome, with the Pope's permission.

The walls and cupola were covered with mosaic, enhanced by both artificial lights and exterior light coming in through the windows. Eginhard provides a description of the inside in his Life of Charlemagne (c. 825–826):

[...] Hence it was that he [Charlemagne] built the beautiful basilica at Aachen, which he adorned with gold and silver and lamps, and with rails and doors of solid brass. He had the columns and marbles for this structure brought from Rome and Ravenna, for he could not find such as were suitable elsewhere. [...] He provided it with a great number of sacred vessels of gold and silver and with such a quantity of clerical robes that not even the doorkeepers who fill the humblest office in the church were obliged to wear their everyday clothes when in the exercise of their duties.

=== Symbolism ===
Odo of Metz applied the Christian symbolism for figures and numbers. The building was conceived as a representation of the heavenly Jerusalem, the Kingdom of God, as described in the Apocalypse. The outer perimeter of the cupola measures exactly 144 Carolingian feet whereas that of the heavenly Jerusalem, ideal city drawn by angels, is of 144 cubits. The mosaic of the cupola, hidden today behind a 19th-century restoration, showed Christ in Majesty with the 24 Elders of the Apocalypse. Other mosaics, on the vaults of the aisle, takes up this subject by representing the heavenly Jerusalem. Charlemagne's throne, located in the West of the second floor, was placed on the seventh step of a platform.

== Other buildings ==
=== Treasury and archives ===
The treasury and archives of the palace were located in a tower tied to the great hall, in the North of the complex. The chamberman was the officer liable for the rulers' treasury and wardrobe. Finance administration fell on the archichaplain, assisted by a treasurer. The treasury gathered gifts brought by the kingdom's important people during the general assemblies or by foreign envoys. This made up an heterogeneous collection of objects ranging from precious books to weapons and clothing. The king would also buy items from merchants visiting Aachen.

The chancellor was liable for the archives. The chancellery employed several scribes and notaries who wrote down diplomas, capitularies and royal correspondence. Agents of the king's offices were mostly clergymen of the chapel.

=== Gallery ===
Location of the gallery within the Palace (red)

The covered gallery was a hundred meters long. It linked the council hall to the chapel; a monumental porch in its middle was used as the main entrance. A room for legal hearing was located on the second floor. The king dispensed justice in this place, although affairs in which important people were involved were handled in the aula regia. When the king was away, this task fell on the Count palatine. The building was also probably used as a garrison.

=== Thermae ===
Location of the thermae (red)

The thermal complex, located in the Southeast, measured 50 acres and included several buildings near the sources of the Emperor and Quirinus. Eginhard mentions a swimming pool that could accommodate one hundred swimmers at a time:

[...] [Charlemagne] enjoyed the exhalations from natural warm springs, and often practised swimming, in which he was such an adept that none could surpass him; and hence it was that he built his palace at Aix-la-Chapelle, and lived there constantly during his latter years until his death. He used not only to invite his sons to his bath, but his nobles and friends, and now and then a troop of his retinue or body guard, so that a hundred or more persons sometimes bathed with him.

=== Other buildings for other functions ===
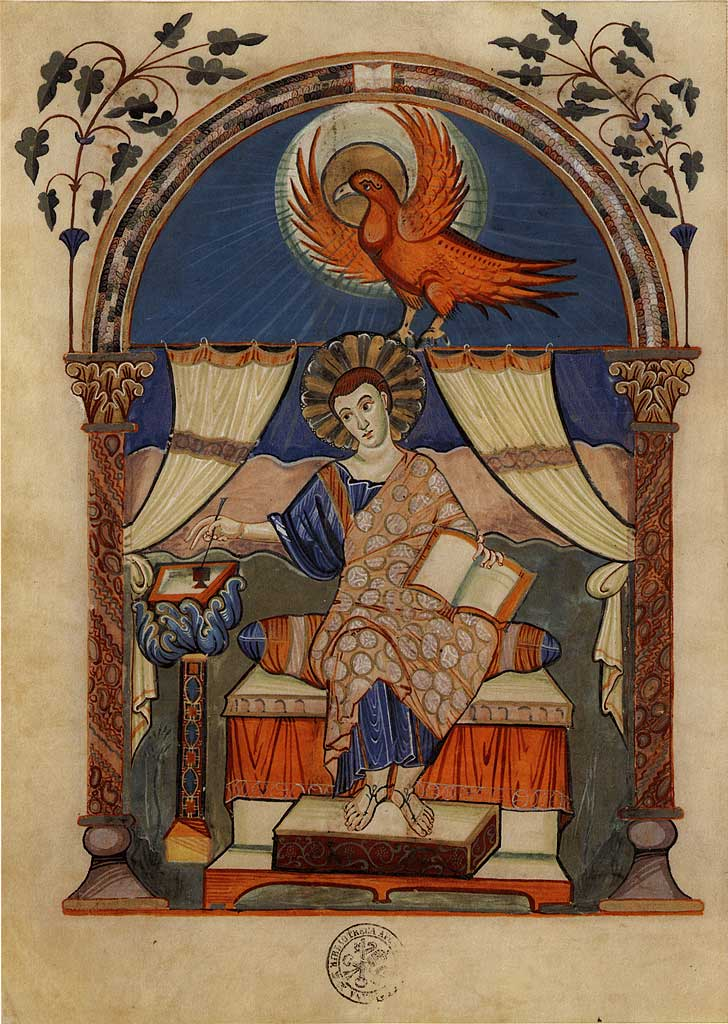
The Codex aureus of Lorsch was made in one of Aachen's palace workshops around 810

The other buildings are not easy to identify because of the lack of detailed enough written accounts. Charlemagne's and his family's apartments seem to have been located in the north-eastern part of the palace complex; his room may have been on the second floor. Some of the servants of the palace must have lived in the western part, and some in the city. The Emperor is said to have owned a library but its exact location is hard to assess. The palace also housed other areas dedicated to artistic creation: a scriptorium that saw the writing of several precious manuscripts (Drogo Sacramentary, Godescalc Evangelistary…), a goldsmith workshop and an ivory workshop. There was also a mint that was still operational in the 13th century.

The palace also housed the literary activities of the Palace Academy. This circle of scholars did not gather in a definite building: Charlemagne liked to listen to poems while he was swimming and eating. The Palace school provided education to the ruler's children and the "nourished ones" (nutriti in Latin), aristocrat sons that were to serve the king.

Outside of the palace complex were also a gynaeceum, barracks, a hospice, a hunting park and a menagerie in which lived the elephant Abul-Abbas, given by Baghdad Caliph Harun al-Rashid. Ermoldus Nigellus describes the place in his Poems on Louis the Pious (first half of the 9th century).

The place was frequented everyday by crowds of people: courtiers, scholars, aristocrats, merchants but also beggars and poor people that came to ask for charity. Internal affairs were the task of officers such as butler, le seneschal, the chamberman.

== Symbolic interpretation of the Palace ==
=== Roman legacy and Byzantine model ===
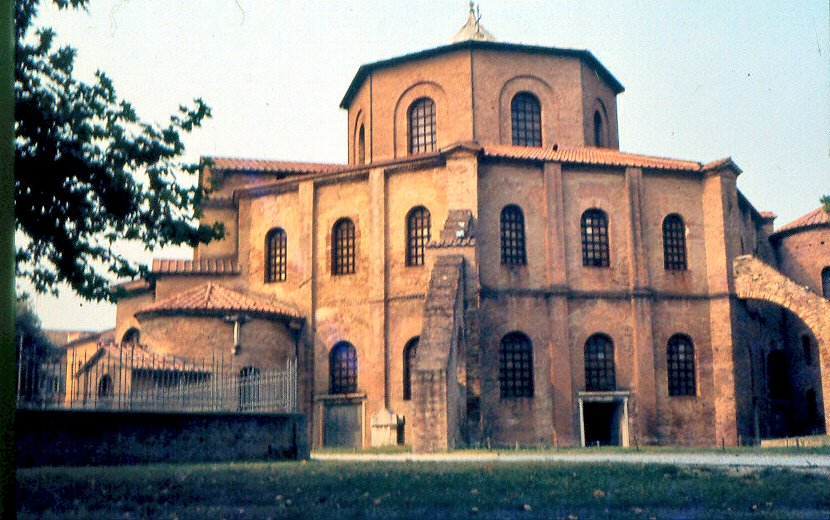
San Vitale Basilica in Ravenna was one of the prototypes for the Palatine Chapel.

The palace borrows several elements of Roman civilization. The Aula Palatina follows a basilical plan. Basilicas in ancient times were public buildings where the city's affairs were discussed. The chapel follows models from ancient Rome: grids exhibit antique decorations (acanthus) and columns are topped by Corinthian capitals. The Emperor was buried in the Palatine Chapel within a 2nd-century marble sarcophagus decorated with a depiction of the abduction of Proserpina. Scholars of Charlemagne's time nicknamed Aachen «the Second Rome».

Charlemagne wished to compete with another Emperor of his time: the Basileus of Constantinople. The cupola and mosaics of the chapel are Byzantine elements. The plan itself is inspired by the Basilica of San Vitale in Ravenna, built by Justinian I in the 6th century. Other experts point to similarities with the Church of the Saints Sergius and Bacchus, Constantinople's Chrysotriklinos and the main throne room in the Great Palace of Constantinople. During religious offices, Charlemagne stood in the second floor gallery, as did the Emperor in Constantinople.

Odo of Metz was also likely inspired by the 8th-century Lombard Palace of Pavia where the chapel was decorated with mosaics and paintings. Although he may have travelled to Italy, it is unlikely that he visited Constantinople.

=== Frankish style ===
Although many references to Roman and Byzantine models are visible in Aachen's buildings, Odo of Metz expressed his talent for Frankish architecture and brought undeniably different elements. The palace is also distinguishable from Merovingian architecture by its large scale and the multiplicity of volumes. The vaulting of the chapel illustrates an original Carolingian expertise, especially in the ambulatory topped with a groin vault. Whereas Byzantine emperors sat in the east to watch offices, Charlemagne sat in the west.

Charlemagne's palace was thus more than a copy of Classical and Byzantine models: it was rather a synthesis of various influences, as a reflection of the Carolingian Empire. Just like Carolingian Renaissance, the palace was a product of the assimilation of several cultures and legacies.

=== Imperial centralization and unity ===
The layout of the palatine complex perfectly implemented the alliance between two powers: the spiritual power was represented by the chapel in the South and the temporal power by the Council Hall in the North. Both of these were linked by the gallery. Since Pepin the Short, Charlemagne's father, Carolingian kings were sacred and received their power from God. Charlemagne himself wanted to influence religious matters through his reforms and the numerous ecumenical council and synods held in Aachen. By establishing the seat of the power and the court in Aachen, Charlemagne knew he would be able to more easily supervise those close to him. The palace was the heart of the capital city, gathering dignitaries from all over the Empire.

== After Charlemagne ==
=== Model for other palaces ===
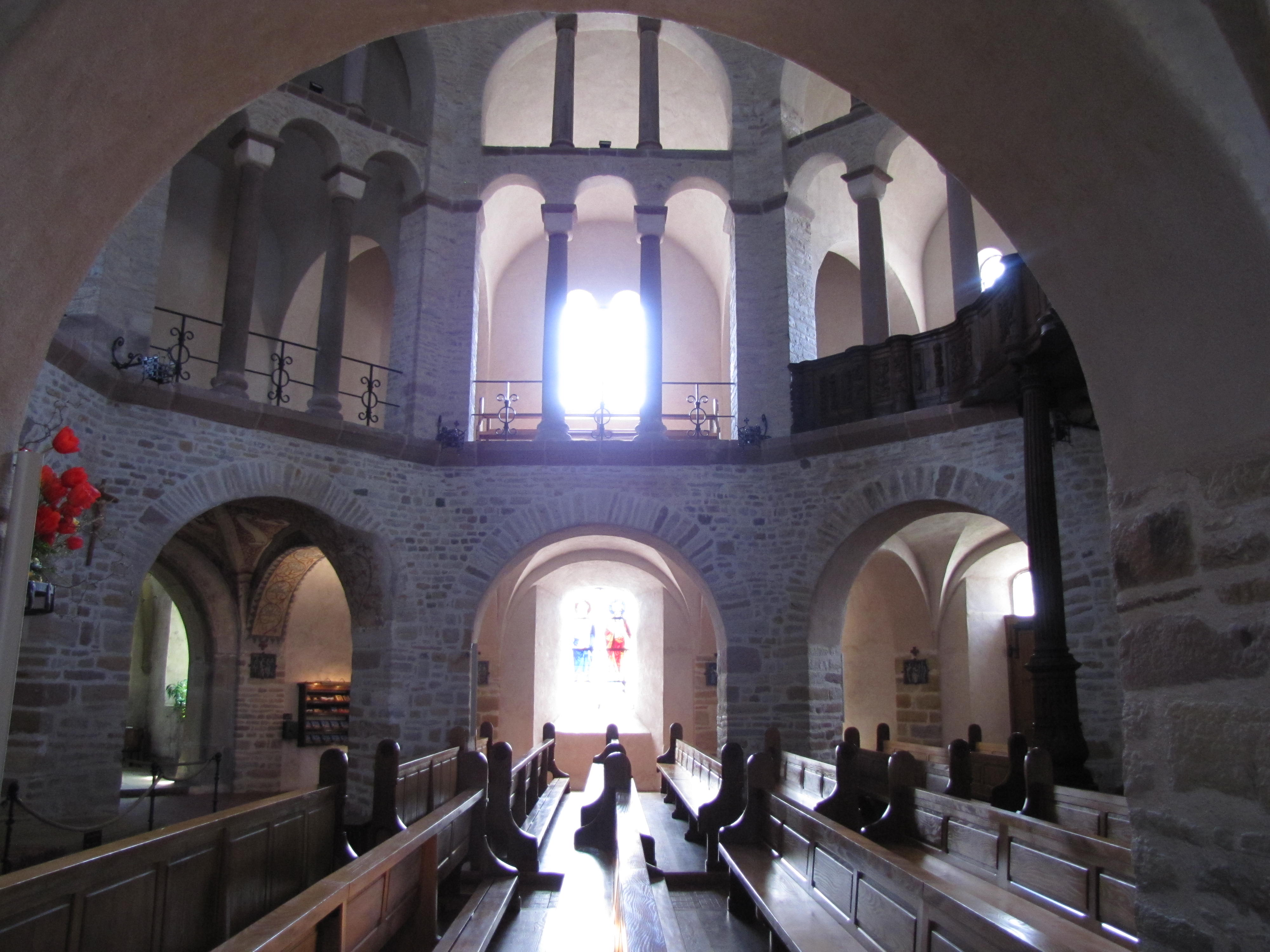
Inside Ottmarsheim's dome, Alsace

It is difficult to know whether other Carolingian palaces did imitate that of Aachen, as most of them have been destroyed. However, the constructions of Aachen were not the only ones undertaken under Charlemagne: 16 cathedrals, 232 monasteries and 65 royal palaces were built between 768 and 814. The Palatine Chapel of Aachen seems to have been imitated by several other buildings of the same kind: The octagonal oratory of Germigny-des-Prés, built in the early 9th century for Theodulf of Orléans seems to have been directly related. The Collegiate church of Liège was built in the 10th century following the plan of the palatine chapel. Ottmarsheim church in Alsace also adopts a centered plan but was built later (11th century). The influence of Aachen's chapel is also found in Compiègne and in other German religious buildings (such as the Abbey church of Essen).

=== Palace history after Charlemagne ===
Charlemagne was buried in the chapel in 814. His son and successor, Emperor Louis the Pious, used the palace of Aachen without making it his exclusive residence. He used to stay there from winter until Easter. Several important Councils were held in Aachen in the early 9th century. Those of 817 and 836 took place in the buildings adjacent to the chapel. In 817, Louis the Pious had his elder son Lothair in the presence of the Frankish people.

Following the Treaty of Verdun in 843, the Carolingian Empire was split into three kingdoms. Aachen was then incorporated into Middle Francia. Lothair I (840–855) and Lothair II (855–869) lived in the palace. When he died, the palace lost its political and cultural significance. Lotharingia became a field of rivalry between the kings of West and East Francia. It was split several times and finally fell under the control of Germany under Henry I the Fowler (876–936).

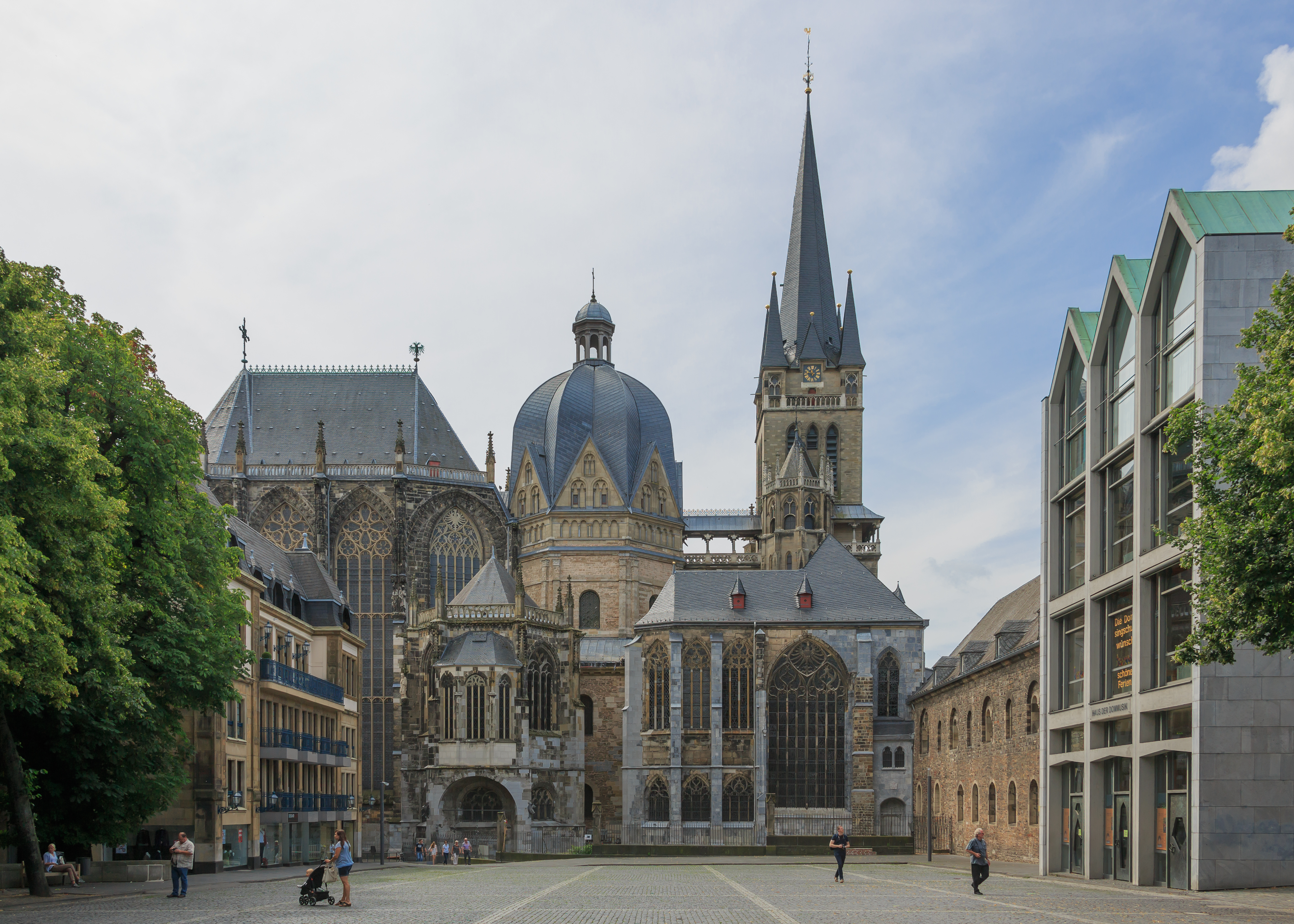
Modern view of Aachen Cathedral.

Yet the memory of Charlemagne's Empire remained fresh and became a symbol of German power. In the 10th century, Otto I (912–973) was crowned King of Germany in Aachen (936). The three-part ceremony took place in several locations within the palace: first in the courtyard (election by the dukes), then in the chapel (handing of the insignia of the Kingdom), finally in the palace (banquet). During the ceremony, Otto sat on Charlemagne's throne. Afterwards, and until the 16th century, all the German Emperors were crowned firstly in Aachen and then in Rome, which highlights the attachment to Charlemagne's political legacy. The Golden Bull of 1356 confirmed that coronations were to take place in the palatine chapel.

Otto II (955–983) lived in Aachen with his wife Theophanu. In the summer of 978 Lothair of France led a raid on Aachen but the Imperial family avoided capture. Relating these events, Richer of Reims states the existence of a bronze eagle, the exact location of which is unknown:

[...] The bronze eagle, that Charlemagne had put on top of the palace in a flight attitude, has been turned back towards the East. The Germans had turned it towards the West to show that their cavalry could beat the French whenever they wanted [...].

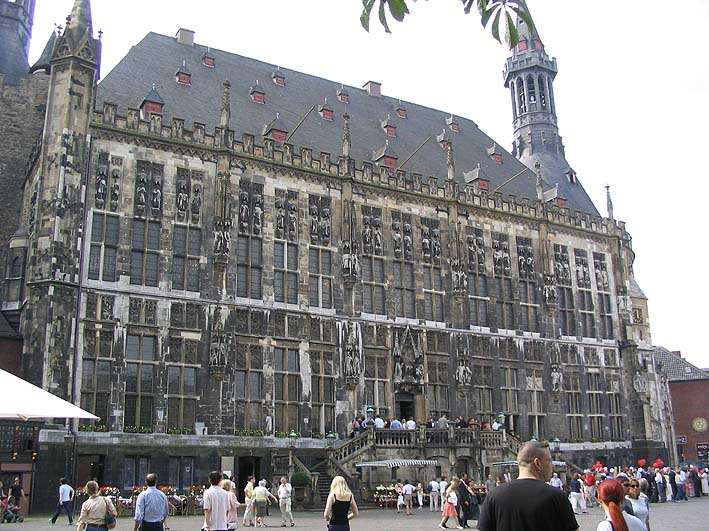
Aachen's City Hall is located on the site of the Council Hall

In 881, a Viking raid damaged the palace and the chapel. In 1000, the Holy Roman Emperor Otto III had Charlemagne's tomb opened. According to two 11th-century chroniclers, he would have been found sitting on his throne, wearing his crown and holding his sceptre. However, Eginhard does not mention this in his biography of the Emperor. At the same time the veneration of Charlemagne began to attract pilgrims to the chapel. In the 12th century, Frederick Barbarossa placed the body of the Carolingian Emperor into a reliquary and interceded with the Pope for his canonization; the relics were scattered across the empire. The treasure of Aachen began to grow with numerous gifts from French and German kings and princes.

Between 1355 and 1414, an apse was added to the east end of the chapel. The City Hall was built from 1267 on the site of the Council Hall. During the French Revolution, the French occupied Aachen and looted its treasure. Before choosing Notre-Dame de Paris, Napoleon I had considered for a time holding his Imperial Coronation in Aachen. The chapel was restored in 1884. In 1978 the cathedral, including the chapel, was listed as a World Heritage Site by UNESCO.

== See also ==
- Aachen
- Carolingian art
- Carolingian Empire
- Palatine Chapel in Aachen
