= Bonjour Biqui, Bonjour! =

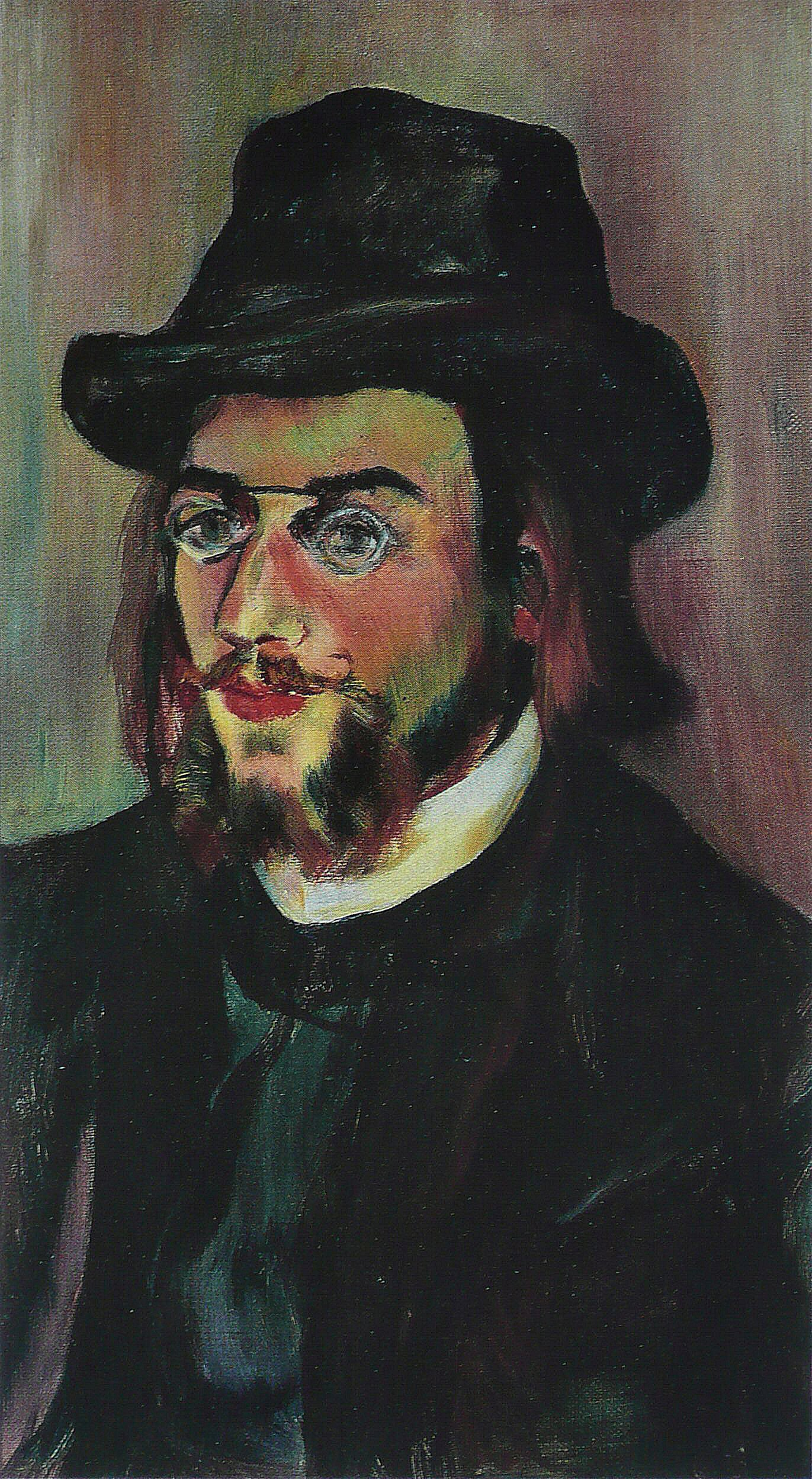
Erik Satie, oil portrait by Suzanne Valadon (1893)

Bonjour Biqui, Bonjour! is an 1893 song for voice and piano with words and music by Erik Satie. At a mere four bars - less than half a minute in performance, and that due to its slow tempo - it is the shortest of his complete compositions. Its significance lies in its rare, enigmatic glimpse into the composer's romance with the painter Suzanne Valadon, the only one he is known to have had. The song is dedicated to her.

== Description ==
Satie composed this musical curio on April 2, 1893, as part of an Easter Sunday gift for Valadon, whom he affectionately nicknamed "Biqui". On a single sheet of music paper, and alternating the use of regular and watered-down ink, he concocted a rather jarring little ditty with just three chords and five notes in the vocal line. The song does not have an actual title. Its pride of place at the top of the score is instead taken by the playing direction très lent ("very slow"), and the greeting "Bonjour Biqui, Bonjour!" constitutes the entire "lyrics."

It is accompanied by a drawing of an innocent-looking Valadon that Satie subtitled an "Authentic Portrait of Biqui". One need only compare it to Valadon's self-portrait of the same year or her depiction in Toulouse-Lautrec's painting The Hangover (c. 1889) to appreciate the extent of Satie's idealization. The sketch and Satie's bold, angular signature beside it dominate the composition, in which the different elements (music, text, drawing) are carefully arranged on the page for visual effect.

Robert Orledge found stylistic links between the song and two other Satie compositions which place all three within the context of the Satie-Valadon affair. Bonjour Biqui and the piano piece Vexations are constructed entirely from "ambiguous diminished chords" first found in the Danses gothiques, which Satie completed on March 23, 1893, in an attempt to regain his composure in the midst of his stormy romance; and the Vexations begins with the same chord with which Bonjour Biqui ends, almost as if one was meant to be an extension of the other. For Orledge these chords were undoubtedly associated with Valadon. "Thus, Bonjour Biqui, Bonjour! is far from being the home-made musical 'Happy Easter' card that it might seem at first glance, and it might well reveal the same anguish over unreciprocated affection that found a more extensive and private expression in Vexations," he wrote. These observations also provide a plausible time frame (April–June, 1893) for the undated Vexations.

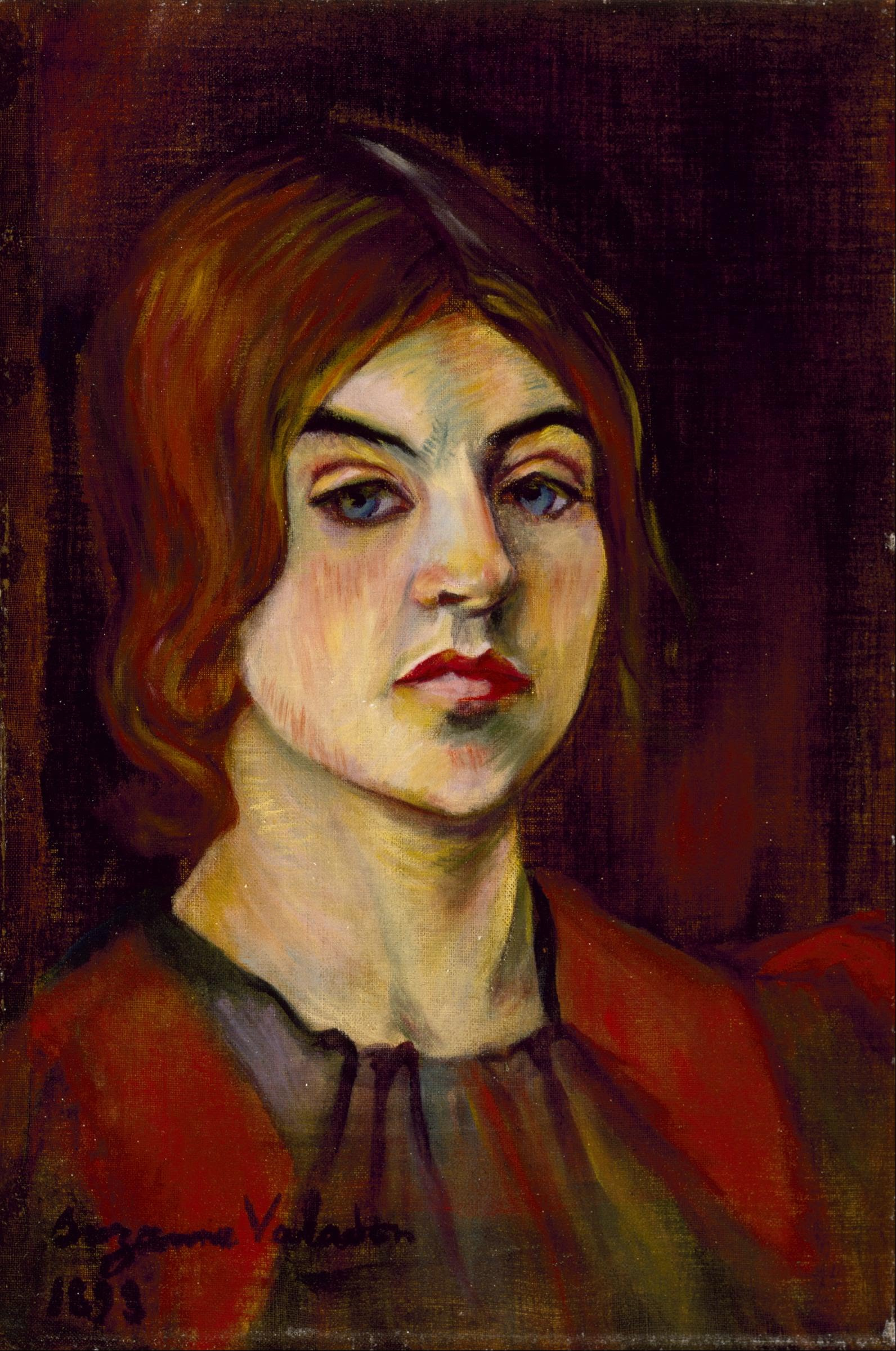
Suzanne Valadon, self-portrait (1893)

The music for Bonjour Biqui does not invite romantic or sentimental comparisons, despite a recent Satie biographer's description of it as "cheerful". It is fairly atonal and very characteristic of Satie's esoteric "Rosicrucian" compositions of the period. Most remarkable is the plaintive prosody of the moniker "Biqui", stretched out over two languishing chords.

There is no evidence Valadon was aware of Satie's intended gift. At that stage in their six-month relationship he was having trouble arranging dates with her, even though they lived in the same building. She finally broke with him in June 1893 and the song remained in Satie's private possession until his death in 1925.

When Pierre-Daniel Templier (1905–1987) published the first Satie biography in 1932, Valadon was still living, and the author omitted any direct mention of her relationship with the composer. He simply noted, "Women did not play an important part in Satie's life. As a mature man, he was not known to have had any affairs." However, Templier included a facsimile of the complete Bonjour Biqui, Bonjour! manuscript, its first appearance in print, which by its intimate nature served as a tacit acknowledgement of this youthful liaison. The facsimile was republished in Rollo H. Myers' English-language biography (1948), but as Valadon had died in 1938 Myers was free to identify her as Satie's one "affaire du coeur" ("affair of the heart"). The original manuscript is now held by the Archives de la Fondation Erik Satie in Paris.
