= Einhard =

Frankish scholar and courtier (c. 775 – 840)

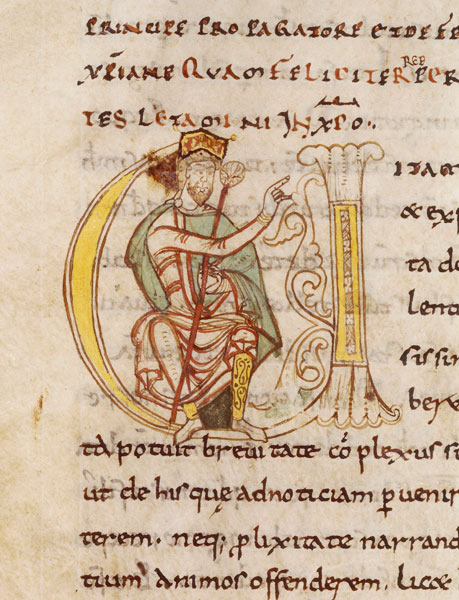
Einhard as scribe. Manuscript depiction from 1050

Einhard (also Eginhard or Einhart; Latin: E(g)inhardus; c. 775 – 14 March 840) was a Frankish scholar and courtier. Einhard was a dedicated servant of Charlemagne and his son Louis the Pious; his main work is a biography of Charlemagne, the Vita Karoli Magni, "one of the most precious literary bequests of the early Middle Ages".

== Public life ==
Einhard was from the eastern German-speaking part of the Frankish Kingdom. Born into a family of landowners of some importance, his parents sent him to be educated by the monks of Fulda, one of the most impressive centers of learning in the Frank lands. Perhaps due to his small stature, which restricted his riding and sword-fighting ability, Einhard concentrated his energies on scholarship, especially the mastering of Latin. He was accepted into the hugely wealthy court of Charlemagne around 791 or 792. Charlemagne actively sought to amass scholarly men around him and established a royal school led by the Northumbrian scholar Alcuin. Einhard was evidently a talented builder and construction manager, because Charlemagne put him in charge of the completion of several palace complexes including Aachen and Ingelheim. Despite the fact that Einhard was on intimate terms with Charlemagne, he never achieved office in his reign. In 814, on Charlemagne's death, his son Louis the Pious made Einhard his private secretary. Einhard retired from court during the time of the disputes between Louis and his sons in the spring of 830.

He died at Seligenstadt in 840.

== Private life ==
Einhard was married to Emma, of whom little is known. There is a possibility that their marriage bore a son, Vussin. Their marriage also appears to have been exceptionally liberal for the period, with Emma being as active as Einhard, if not more so, in the handling of their property. It is said that in the later years of their marriage Emma and Einhard abstained from sexual relations, choosing instead to focus their attentions on their many religious commitments. Though he was undoubtedly devoted to her, Einhard wrote nothing of his wife until after her death on 13 December 835, when he wrote to a friend that he was reminded of her loss in ‘every day, in every action, in every undertaking, in all the administration of the house and household, in everything needing to be decided upon and sorted out in my religious and earthly responsibilities’.

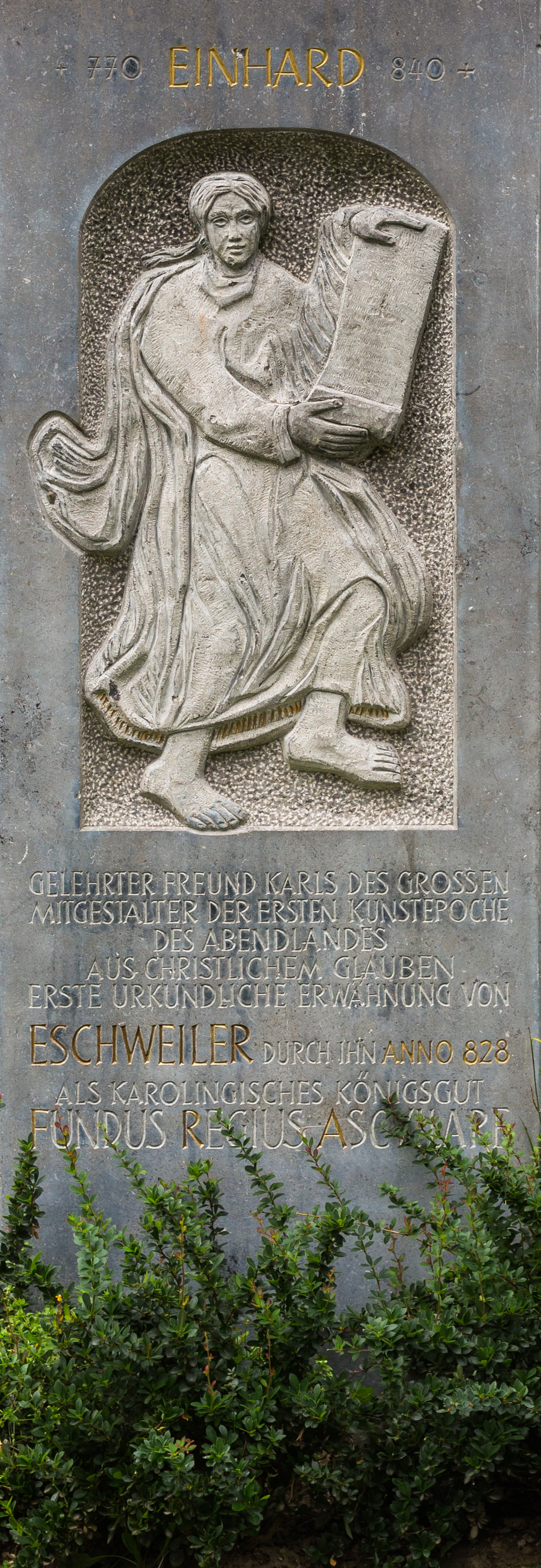
Einhard memorial in the German city of Eschweiler

== Religious beliefs ==
Einhard made numerous references to himself as a "sinner" according to his strong Christian faith. He erected churches at both of his estates in Michelstadt and Mulinheim. In Michelstadt, he also saw fit to build a basilica completed in 827 and then sent a servant, Ratleic, to Rome with an end to find relics for the new building. Once in Rome, Ratleic robbed a catacomb of the bones of the Martyrs Marcellinus and Peter and had them translated to Michelstadt. Once there, the relics made it known they were unhappy with their new tomb and thus had to be moved again to Mulinheim. Once established there, they proved to be miracle workers. Although unsure as to why these saints should choose such a "sinner" as their patron, Einhard nonetheless set about ensuring they continued to receive a resting place fitting of their honour. Between 831 and 834 he founded a Benedictine Monastery and, after the death of his wife, served as its Abbot until his own death in 840.

== Local lore ==
Local lore from Seligenstadt portrays Einhard as the lover of Emma, one of Charlemagne's daughters, and has the couple elope from court. Charlemagne found them at Seligenstadt (then called Obermühlheim) and forgave them. This account is used to explain the name "Seligenstadt" ("town of the blessed ones") in folk etymology. Einhard and his wife were originally buried in one sarcophagus in the choir of the church in Seligenstadt, but in 1810 the sarcophagus was presented by the Grand Duke of Hesse to the count of Erbach, who claims descent from Einhard as the husband of Imma, the reputed daughter of Charlemagne. The count put it in the famous chapel of his castle at Erbach in the Odenwald.

== Works ==
The most famous of Einhard's works is his biography of Charlemagne, the Vita Karoli Magni, "The Life of Charlemagne" (c. 817–836), which provides much direct information about Charlemagne's life and character, written sometime between 817 and 830. In composing this he relied heavily upon the Royal Frankish Annals. Einhard's literary model was the classical work of the Roman historian Suetonius, the Lives of the Caesars, though it is important to stress that the work is very much Einhard's own, that is to say he adapts the models and sources for his own purposes. His work was written as a praise of Charlemagne, whom he regarded as a foster-father (nutritor) and to whom he was a debtor "in life and death". The work thus contains an understandable degree of bias, Einhard taking care to exculpate Charlemagne in some matters, not mention others, and to gloss over certain issues which would be of embarrassment to Charlemagne, such as the morality of his daughters; by contrast, other issues are curiously not glossed over, like his concubines.

Einhard is also responsible for three other extant works: a collection of letters, On the Translations and the Miracles of SS. Marcellinus and Petrus, and On the Adoration of the Cross. The latter dates from c. 830 and was not rediscovered until 1885, when Ernst Dümmler identified a text in a manuscript in Vienna as the missing Libellus de adoranda cruce, which Einhard had dedicated to his pupil Lupus Servatus.

=== Arch of Einhard ===
The Arch of Einhard was a reliquary made by Einhard, which reproduced on a small scale a Roman triumphal arch that represented the victory of Christianity. It has not survived.

== See also ==
- Prélude d'Eginhard, a musical piece by Erik Satie about Einhard.
- Royal Frankish Annals

== Bibliography ==
- "Der hessische Spessart" (in German). HR Online.
- Dümmler, Ernst (1885). "Ein Nachtrag zu Einhards Werken". Neues Archiv der Gesellschaft für ältere deutsche Geschichtskunde. 11: 231–38.
- "Einhard c. 770–840". Enotes.
- Hodgkin, T. (1897). Charles the Great. London: Macmillan. ISBN 9781406730265.
- Levison, Wilhelm; Wilhelm Wattenbach; Rudolf Buchner (1952). Deutschlands Geschichtsquellen im Mittelalter, Vorzeit und Karolinger: Heft. Die Karolinger vom Anfang des 8. Jahrhunderts bis zum Tode Karis des Grossen (in German). H. Böhlaus Nachfolger.
- Müller, Bianca (2009). Persönlichkeit Karl des Großen nach Einhards Vita Karoli Magni. GRIN Verlag. ISBN 978-3-640-47253-6.
- Schaff, Philip. ""Einhard"". History of the Christian Church. Vol. IV: Mediaeval Christianity. A.D. 590-1073.
- Smith, Julia (March 2003). "Einhard". Transactions of the Royal Historical Society: 55–77. doi:10.1017/S0080440103000033. S2CID 161939220.
- Stofferahn, Steven A. (2010). "Knowledge for Its Own Sake? A Practical Humanist in the Carolingian Age". The Heroic Age. 13.
- Tischler, Matthias M. (2001) Einharts Vita Karoli. Studien zur Entstehung, Überlieferung und Rezeption (MGH. Schriften 48, I–II), Hanover: Hahn. ISBN 3-7752-5448-X.
- Thorpe, Lewis G.M. (1969). Einhard and Notker the Stammerer: two lives of Charlemagne. London: Penguin. ISBN 978-0-14-044213-7.
- Noble, Thomas F.X. (2009). Charlemagne and Louis the Pious: Lives by Einhard, Notker, Ermoldus, Thegan, and the Astronomer. Penn State Press. ISBN 978-0-27-103715-8.
- Chiesa, Paolo, ed. (2014). Eginardo, Vita Karoli. Firenze: Edizioni del Galluzzo. ISBN 978-88-8450-537-8.
