= Vita Karoli Magni =

Biography of Charlemagne by Einhard

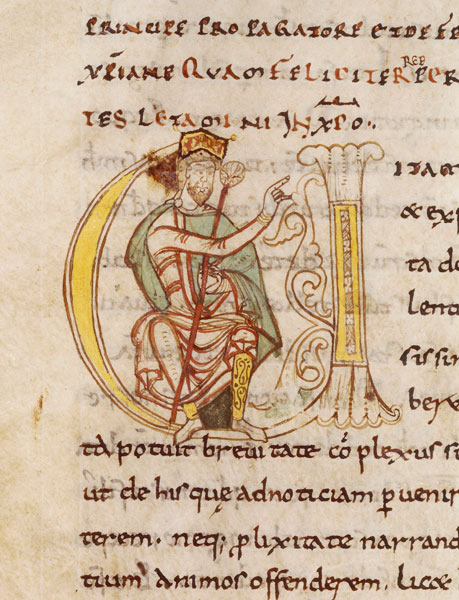
Einhard in a historiated initial from an 11th-century copy of his Vita Karoli Magni

Vita Karoli Magni (Life of Charlemagne) is a biography of Charlemagne, King of the Franks and Emperor of the Romans, written by Einhard. The Life of Charlemagne is a 33 chapter account starting with the full genealogy of the Merovingian family, going through the rise of the Carolingian dynasty, and then detailing the exploits and temperament of King Charles. It has long been seen as one of the key sources for the reign of Charlemagne and provides insight into the court of King Charles and the events that surrounded him.

== Synopsis ==
The work begins with a preface that is mainly Einhard explaining why he is writing the book, highlighting the idea that he feels it is his duty and that he had such love for Charles that he felt that it would be a tragedy if he was forgotten. The book then moves onto the fall of the Merovingian family and how the Carolingian came to power, briefly describing the kingship of Pepin the Short and the years of joint rule between Charlemagne and Carloman.

A large section of the book is then dedicated to going through Charlemagne's many conquest and military campaigns. Einhard goes to great efforts to frame all of the conquests as justified and even righteous; in most cases, however, he is vague on the details of how the wars went and simply summaries the reasons for why they started and what the outcome was.

Einhard then describes at length both Charlemagne's physical appearance and his personality, making sure to highlight all the good qualities of Charles, especially his piety and moderation in all worldly pleasures. In this section of the book Einhard also talks about some of Charlemagne's many children, and seemingly tries to explain the reason that he never let his daughters marry was because he simply loved them too much to be parted from them. Einhard's brief description of the rebellion of Pepin the Hunchback is of importance, as we know much more about Pepin than what Einhard says, and many historians have seen his account as historical revisionism.

The final part of the book deals mainly with Charlemagne being crowned Roman Emperor on Christmas day of the year 800 and it also lays out his death and will as well as the ascension of his son Louis the Pious. The book claims that Charlemagne had no idea that he was to be crowned emperor going so far as to state that:

He at first had such an aversion that he declared that he would not have set foot in the Church the day that they [the imperial titles] were conferred, although it was a great feast-day, if he could have foreseen the design of the Pope.

Whether this account is accurate has been debated, with most modern historians having reached the conclusion that Charlemagne must have definitely known about the Pope's plans long before it happened. The work ends with a copy of Charlemagne's will and a description of his burial, bringing the book to a close on a sombre note.

== Literary context ==
Historians have traditionally described the work as the first example of a biography of a European king. The author tried to imitate the style of that of the ancient Roman biographer Gaius Suetonius Tranquillus, who is most famous for his Lives of the Caesars. Einhard's biography used especially the model of the biography of Emperor Augustus, the first emperor of the Roman Empire.

== Date ==
The date of the work is uncertain, and a number of theories have been put forward. The inclusion of Charlemagne's will at the end of the work makes it fairly clear that it was written after his death in 814. The first reference to the work, however, comes in a letter to Einhard from Lupus of Ferrieres, which is dated to the mid-9th century. Dates have been suggested ranging from about 817 to 833, usually based on interpretations of the text in the political context of the first years of the reign of Louis the Pious and Louis's attitude to his father. No theory has yet emerged as an obvious frontrunner, and it is likely that debate will continue.

== Author ==
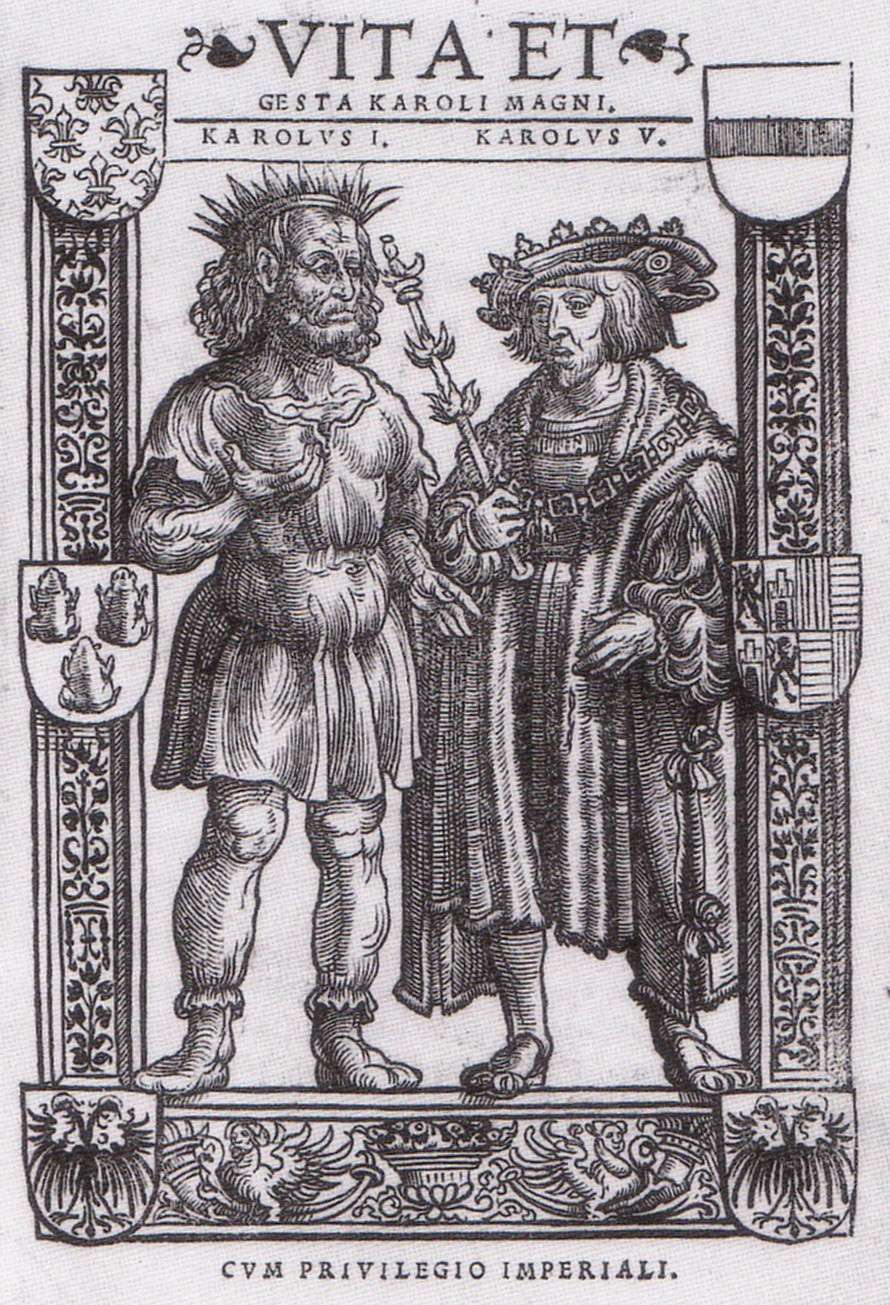
Charlemagne and Charles V from Vita et gesta Karoli Magni, Cologne 1521

Einhard's book is about intimate glimpses of Charlemagne's personal habits and tastes. He occupied a favoured position at Charlemagne's court so he had inside information. Einhard received advanced schooling at the monastery of Fulda sometime after 779. He was an exceptional student and was quite knowledgeable. The word was sent to Charlemagne of Einhard's expertise. He was then sent to Charlemagne’s Palace School at Aachen in 791. Einhard then received employment at Charlemagne's Frankish court about 796. He remained at this position for twenty some years. Einhard's book was expressly intended to convey his appreciation for advanced education. He wrote his biography after he had left Aachen and was living in Seligenstadt.

Some scholars have debated whether Einhard used the Historia Augusta in Vita Karoli Magni. Scholars Justin Stover and George Woudhuysen have challenged that, arguing that the claim is "weakly grounded."

=== Einhard and Charlemagne ===
Einhard's position while with Charlemagne was that of a modern minister of public works so he had intimate knowledge of his court. Einhard was also given the responsibility of many of Charlemagne's abbeys. It used to be suggested that Einhard's wife, Emma, was a daughter of Charlemagne; that can generally be disregarded as a twelfth-century fabrication, however, since there is no proof.

== Reliability ==
Most biographies of the Middle Ages related only good deeds of their subject, with many embellishments to improve their subject. Einhard's biography, however, is considered, for the most part, to be a trustworthy account of Charlemagne's life. It is considered an excellent account of earlier Medieval life. Despite Einhard's limitations, since it was his first attempt at a major writing, the British historian Thomas Hodgkin said, "almost all our real, vivifying knowledge of Charles the Great is derived from Einhard, and that the Vita Karoli Magni is one of the most precious literary bequests of the early Middle Ages."

== Sources ==
=== Translations ===
- Chiesa, P. Vita Karoli. Florence: SISMEL / Ed. del Galluzzo, 2014.
- Dutton, P. (1998). Charlemagne's Courtier: the Complete Einhard. Peterborough: Broadview Press. ISBN 978-1-55111-134-6.
- Firchow, Evelyn S.; Edwin H. Zeydel (1985). Vita Karoli Magni / The Life of Charlemagne. Saarbrücken: AQ-Verlag. ISBN 978-3-922441-49-6.
- Ganz, D. (2008). Two lives of Charlemagne / Einhard and Notker the Stammerer. London: Penguin. ISBN 978-0-14-045505-2.
- Grant, A.J. (1905). Early lives of Charlemagne / by Eginhard and the Monk of St Gall. London: Moring.
- Thorpe, L. (1969). Two lives of Charlemagne / by Einhard and Notker the Stammerer. Harmondsworth: Penguin. ISBN 0-14-044213-8.

=== Studies ===
- Ganz, D. (1997). "The Preface to Einhard's Vita Karoli". In H. Schefers (ed.). Einhard: Studien zu leben und Werk. Hessische Historische Kommission. pp. 299–310. ISBN 978-3-88443-033-0.
- Hodgkin, T. (1897). Charles the Great. London: Macmillan. ISBN 978-1-4067-3026-5.
- Holdsworth, C.J.; T.P. Wiseman (1986). The Inheritance of historiography, 350–900. Exeter: University of Exeter. ISBN 0-85989-272-7.
- Innes, M. (1996–1997). "The Classical Tradition and Carolingian Historiography: Encounters with Suetonius". International Journal of the Classical Tradition. 3 (3): 265–282. doi:10.1007/BF02686391. S2CID 162261543.
- Kempshall, M. (1995). "Some Ciceronian Models for Einhard' s Life of Charlemagne". Viator. 26: 11–38. doi:10.1484/J.VIATOR.2.301133.
- Latowsky, Anne A. (2013). Emperor of the World: Charlemagne and the Construction of Imperial Authority, 800–1229. Ithaca, N.Y.–London: Cornell University Press.
- Ogg, F.A. (1907). A Source Book of Medieval History. New York: American Book Company.
- Nelson, J. (2005). "Charlemagne the Man". In J. Story (ed.). Charlemagne: Empire and Society. Manchester: Manchester University Press. ISBN 978-0-7190-7089-1.
- Southern, Pat (1998). Augustus. Routledge. ISBN 0-415-16631-4.
- Tischler, M. (2001). Einharts Vita Karoli : Studien zur Entstehung, Überlieferung und Rezeption (in German). Hannover: Hahnsche Buchhandlung. ISBN 3-7752-5448-X.
