= Danses gothiques =

Piano composition by Erik Satie

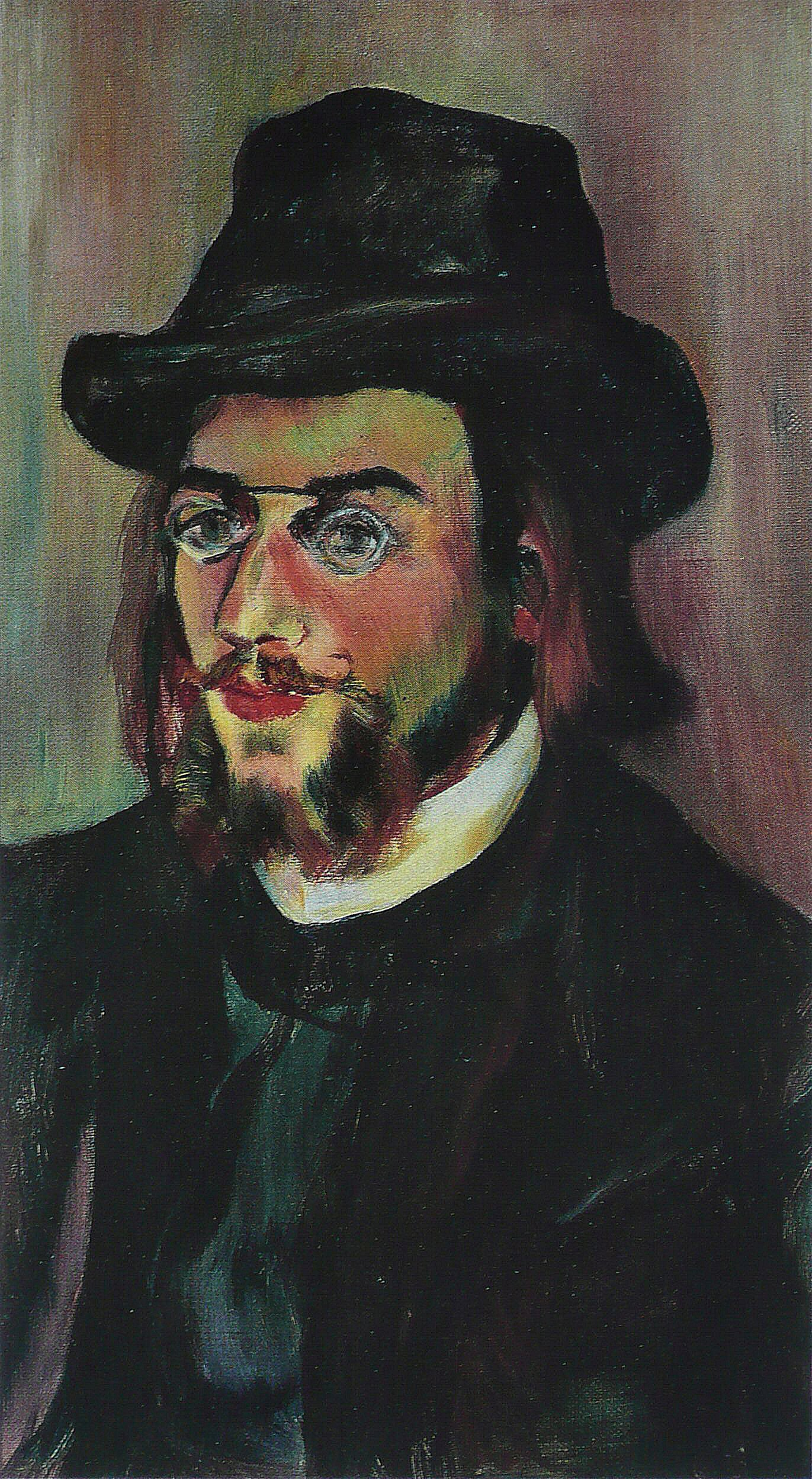
Erik Satie, oil portrait by Suzanne Valadon (1893)

The Danses gothiques (Gothic Dances) is an 1893 piano composition by Erik Satie, one of the works of his "Rosicrucian" or "mystic" period. It was published posthumously in 1929. A performance lasts around 12 minutes.

== Background ==
The Danses gothiques was composed in the middle of Satie's six-month love affair (January to June 1893) with the painter Suzanne Valadon, when he was torn between his religious preoccupations of the period and more earthly matters. It was the only intimate relationship he is known to have had, and he was clearly the more emotionally vulnerable of the two. The free-spirited Valadon, whom Satie affectionately called "Biqui", took a room near his at 6 Rue Cortot in Montmartre to facilitate the romance; and she painted a now-famous portrait of him, one of her earliest efforts in oils. But she rejected his proposal of marriage and continued to see other men. Chief among them was the stockbroker Paul Moussis, with whom she had an intermittent but long-standing liaison until they finally married in 1896. "At that stage in her life, her love affairs seemed to pass over her like sunshine", Valadon biographer June Rose noted.

Given their shared connections in the Montmartre bohemian scene, it is unlikely Satie would not have at least heard rumors about this. His status as a part-time lover, whether he recognized it or not, is suggested in his only surviving letter to Valadon, dated March 11, 1893. He is trying to arrange a date with her: "Don't forget that your poor friend hopes to see you...Let me add, Biqui chéri, that I shall on no account get angry if you can't come to any of these rendezvous; I have now become terribly reasonable; and in spite of the great happiness it gives me to see you I am beginning to understand that you can't always do what you want."

Satie was soon working on the Danses gothiques, which was completed between March 21 and 23, 1893. His conflicted feelings are reflected in the subtitle of the piece, "A Novena for the great calm and profound tranquility of my Soul".

== Music and texts ==
The title of the Danses gothiques is something of a misnomer. It is in fact one continuous piece of music, a series of interrelated chord sequences unified by a recurring rhythmic figure of two eighth notes and a quarter note. These were divided – apparently after the music was composed – into nine parts by what Robert Orledge called "quasi-religious and self-pitying titles." The central focus is the Dance No. 5 (For the poor deceased), which in length almost exactly balances No. 1 and employs all but one of the work's motifs. The "dances" themselves are meditative rather than dance-like, and are all to be played très lent ("very slow"), the characteristic tempo of Satie's "Rosicrucian" compositions.

Curiously, four of the titles (Nos. 4, 7–9) are introduced in mid-motif, obscuring where the parts are supposed to begin and end. Satie, with his interdisciplinary interests, was as much concerned with the look of his scores on the printed page as he was with their musical effect. This led Swedish pianist-musicologist Olof Höjer to suggest a theory about the extramusical structure of the Danses gothiques: "Judging by the appearance of the manuscript, it seems that his main interest was the optical impression that the arrangement of the different parts would make on the score along with the headings. Perhaps this is an early example – maybe even the first – of a musical mise en page, an artistically intended integration of music, notation and text, quite probably inspired by Satie's contact with contemporary poets."

Satie's dedication reads, "To the Transcendent, Solemn and Representative Ecstasy of Saint Benedict, and the Preparatory Methodology of the Most Powerful Benedictine Order." The titles are:

1. à l'occasion d'une grande peine (On the occasion of a great sorrow)
2. Dans laquelle les Pères de la Très Véritable et Très Sainte Église sont invoqués (On which the Fathers of the True and Holy Church are invoked)
3. En faveur d'un malheureux (On behalf of a poor wretch)
4. A propos de Saint Bernard et de Sainte Lucie (Concerning Saint Bernard and Saint Lucy)
5. Pour les pauvres trépassés (For the poor deceased)
6. Où il est question du pardon des injures reçues (Where there is question of forgiveness for insults received)
7. Par pitié pour les ivrognes, honteux, débauchés, imparfaits, désagréables, et faussaires en tous genres (Out of pity for the drunken, disgraced, corrupted, faulty, unlikable, and forgers of all sorts)
8. En le haut honneur du vénéré Saint Michel, le gracieux Archange (In high honor of the venerable Saint Michael, the graceful Archangel)
9. Après avoir obtenu la remise de ses fautes (After having obtained the remission of their faults)

Satie read extensively about the lives of the Catholic saints, and the four invoked in the Danses gothiques may well have had a personal significance for him. Apart from preaching reasonableness in living amongst others, Saint Benedict advocated an architecture for sacred buildings that was austere and devoid of ornamentation, a creative aesthetic Satie pursued in music throughout his life. Benedict is also a patron of the dying, and this provides a thematic link between the dedication and the titles of Dances Nos. 5 and 8. The latter is dedicated to Saint Michael, the archangel of death who weighs souls on a scale to determine their eligibility for heaven.

The title Concerning Saint Bernard and Saint Lucy (No. 4) touches on Satie's lifelong fascination with eyes and their recurrence as a literary motif in his work. At first glance the 12th century French abbot who preached the Second Crusade and the 3rd century Sicilian virgin martyr would seem a strange pairing. But Saint Lucy is a patron of the blind, and eyes figure in the iconography of both. Saint Lucy was often depicted bearing her eyes on a platter, having (according to one tradition) gouged them out herself to ward off a persistent suitor. And in a variant of Saint Bernard's "Lactation Miracle" he was healed of an ailment that threatened his sight by praying to an image of the Nursing Madonna. The icon came to life and squirted her breast milk into his eyes.

The other headings seem to strike a more direct personal note. Olof Höjer wrote, "It is certainly tempting to see these titles...as references to [Satie] and his relationship with Suzanne Valadon, veiled under liturgic wordings. As a whole, a strange and remarkable contrast: abstract and totally unemotional piano structures functioning as a purification for a soul tormented by carnal lust and erotic conflicts. Is this music made for listening? Or even for playing?"

== Conclusion ==
Satie appeared to have been initially pleased with the Danses gothiques. On March 24, 1893, the day after its completion, he registered the music with SACEM with an eye towards future publication. But after Valadon left him in June he put it aside to gather dust. Three other compositions have been linked to the Satie-Valadon affair and its end: the brief song Bonjour Biqui, Bonjour! (1893), the notorious piano piece Vexations (c. 1893), and the Messe des pauvres (1893–95). Virtually none of this material was published in Satie's lifetime.

In 1911, when Parisian audiences belatedly began to embrace his music, Satie allowed No. 1 of the Danses gothiques to appear in the March issue of the Société musicale indépendante's journal Revue musicale; but he made no further effort to promote a piece that could have held painful memories for him. After Satie's death Darius Milhaud arranged to have the complete score published by Rouart, Lerolle & Cie.

== Recordings ==
- Frank Glazer (Vox, 1970)
- Aldo Ciccolini (twice for EMI, 1971 and 1988)
- Reinbert de Leeuw (Harlekijn, 1975, reissued by Philips, 1980)
- Jean-Pierre Armengaud (Circé, 1990)
- Klára Koermendi (Naxos, 1993)
- Bojan Gorišek (Audiophile Classics, 1994)
- John White (Ars Nova, 1995)
- Olof Höjer (Swedish Society Discofil, 1996)
- Jean-Yves Thibaudet (Decca, 2002)
- Steffen Schleiermacher (MGD, 2002)
- Cristina Ariagno (Brilliant Classics, 2006)
- Alessandro Simonetto (Aevea, 2016)
- Alessandro Simonetto (OnClassical, 2021)
- Noriko Ogawa (BIS, 2022)
