= Kaiserpfalz =

Palaces throughout the Holy Roman Empire which served as temporary seats for the Emperor

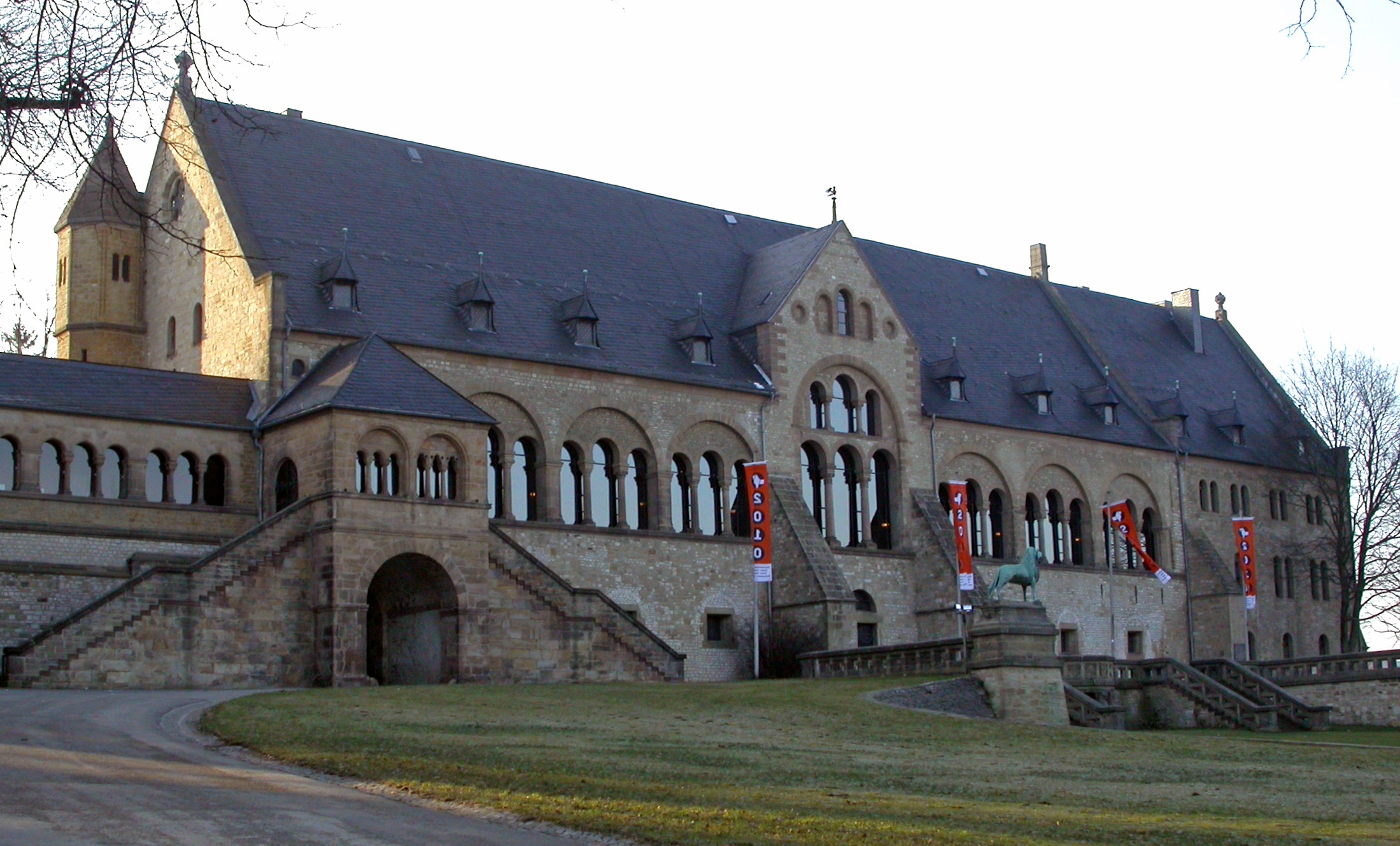
Imperial Palace of Goslar, built 1030−1055. One of the few original, albeit heavily restored, palaces remaining.

The term Kaiserpfalz (German: [ˈkaɪzɐˌpfalts], "imperial palace") or Königspfalz (German: [ˈkøːnɪçsˌpfalts], "royal palace", from Middle High German phal[en]ze to Old High German phalanza from Middle Latin palatia [plural] to Latin palatium "palace") refers to a number of palaces and castles across the Holy Roman Empire that served as temporary seats of power for the Holy Roman Emperor in the Early and High Middle Ages.

The dukes and bishops of the empire also owned palaces, which were sometimes referred to as "pfalzen", especially since they were obliged to accommodate the emperor and his court when they were in transit, a duty referred to as Gastungspflicht (obligation to accommodate).

== Origin of the name ==
Kaiserpfalz is a German word that is a combination of Kaiser, meaning "emperor", which is derived from "caesar"; and Pfalz, meaning "palace", and itself derived from the Latin palatium, meaning the same (see palace). Likewise Königspfalz is a combination of König, "king", and Pfalz, meaning "royal palace".

Because pfalzen were built and used by the king as a ruler of the Kingdom of Germany, the correct historical term is Königspfalz or "royal palace". The term Kaiserpfalz is a 19th-century appellation that overlooks the fact that a king of Germany did not bear the title of the Holy Roman Emperor (granted by the Pope) until after his imperial coronation which required expeditions to Italy (Italienzug), which mostly were only undertaken years after his accession to the throne and in many cases not at all.

== Tradition of the “Itinerant Courts” ==
Artist's impression of the Königspfalz at Aachen (Palace of Aachen), built in the 790s. At the back is the Palatine Chapel, today the rotunda of Aachen Cathedral, in the foreground the aula regia (on the site of today's Aachen Town Hall, with the tower still standing). On the left the imperial bath spa, fed by hot springs.

Like their peers in France and England, the medieval emperors of the Holy Roman Empire did not rule from a capital city, but had to maintain personal contact with their vassals on the ground. This was the so-called "itinerant kingship" or "itinerant court"; in German called Reisekönigtum ("travelling kingship").

The Merovingians in the Frankish Empire already ruled according to the feudal principle in which a ruler does not rule over a territory with specific land boundaries with the support of administrative officials, as in a territorial state, but rather his sovereignty was based on a personal relationship of dependence between feudal lords and their vassals (Personenverbandsstaat, a "personal dependency state"). Therefore, this dependency had to be constantly maintained and renewed, including through the allocation of positions or land. This was one of the reasons why kings and emperors constantly traveled around their realm and held Hoftage (court days, i. e. meetings with the powerful of the empire) and court sessions (to settle disputes and punish offenses to prove their authority) alternately in different parts of the country. A second reason was a lack of communication options over long distances at a time when there were often hardly any solid roads. Therefore, the court had to show its presence in order to keep the realm under control. A third reason was supply bottlenecks: Due to inadequate transport routes, it was not yet possible until the 13th century to provide long-term food supply for hundreds of people who had traveled to the same place, in addition to the local population. Consequently, instead of sending food to royal courts, the courts went to the food.

In France and England, where centralized states developed early, from the 13th century onwards, stationary royal residences began to develop into capitals that grew rapidly and developed corresponding infrastructure: the Palais de la Cité and the Palace of Westminster became the respective main residences. This was not possible in the Holy Roman Empire because no real hereditary monarchy emerged, but rather the tradition of elective monarchy prevailed (see: Imperial election, List of royal and imperial elections in the Holy Roman Empire) which led to kings of very different regional origins being elected. But if they wanted to control the empire and its often rebellious regional rulers, they could not limit themselves to their home region and their private palaces. As a result, kings and emperors continued to travel around the empire well into modern times. It was only King Ferdinand I, the younger brother of the then Emperor Charles V, who moved his main residence to the Vienna Hofburg in the middle of the 16th century, where most of the following Habsburg emperors subsequently resided. However, Vienna never became the official capital of the empire, just of a Habsburg hereditary state (the Archduchy of Austria). The emperors continued to travel to their elections and coronations at Frankfurt and Aachen, to the Imperial Diets (which developed from the “Hoftage”) at different places and to other occasions such as weddings, negotiations with other monarchs or military campaigns. The Perpetual Diet of Regensburg was based in Regensburg from 1663 to 1806. Rudolf II resided in Prague, the Wittelsbach emperor Charles VII in Munich.

== Purpose, locations, description ==
Unlike the common notion of "palace", a pfalz was not a permanent residence but a place where the emperor stayed for a certain time, at most a few months; itineraries suggest that the monarch rarely would stay for longer than a few weeks, on mere transit stages often only a few days. Moreover, they were not always grand palaces in the accepted sense: some were small manor houses or fortified hunting lodges, such as Bodfeld in the Harz. But generally they were large manor houses (Gutshöfe), that offered catering and accommodation for the king and his companions, often running to hundreds of staff, as well as numerous guests and their staff and horses. For accommodation there were wooden outbuildings around the mostly stone main buildings. In Latin, such a royal manor was known as a villa regia or curtis regia. It is these expressions (and not pfalz) that are mostly mentioned in contemporary Latin documents. Unlike a pfalz, where the itinerant ruler stayed for a while and enacted his sovereign duties, a royal estate (Königshof) was just a farm with a smaller manor owned by the kingdom, which was occasionally used by the kings as a transit station. However, they were mostly mentioned in documents using the same Latin expressions.

Pfalzen were often located near the remaining urban remnants of Roman times, the oldest cities in Germany, which were also mostly located on navigable rivers, which enabled quick and comfortable travel and also made supplies easier, mainly on the Rhine, Main and Danube. Old bishoprics were often located in these places, which also had the advantage that bishops were usually more loyal to the king than the dukes, who pursued their own dynastic goals. The kings even appointed the bishops, until the investiture controversy. Furthermore, such houses were often located in the countryside in the middle of royal estates or near important abbeys. Pfalzen and smaller royal manors were generally built at intervals of 30 kilometres (18 miles), which at that time corresponded to a day's journey by the royal train of horses and chariots. (Individual riders managed much longer distances on dry ground.)

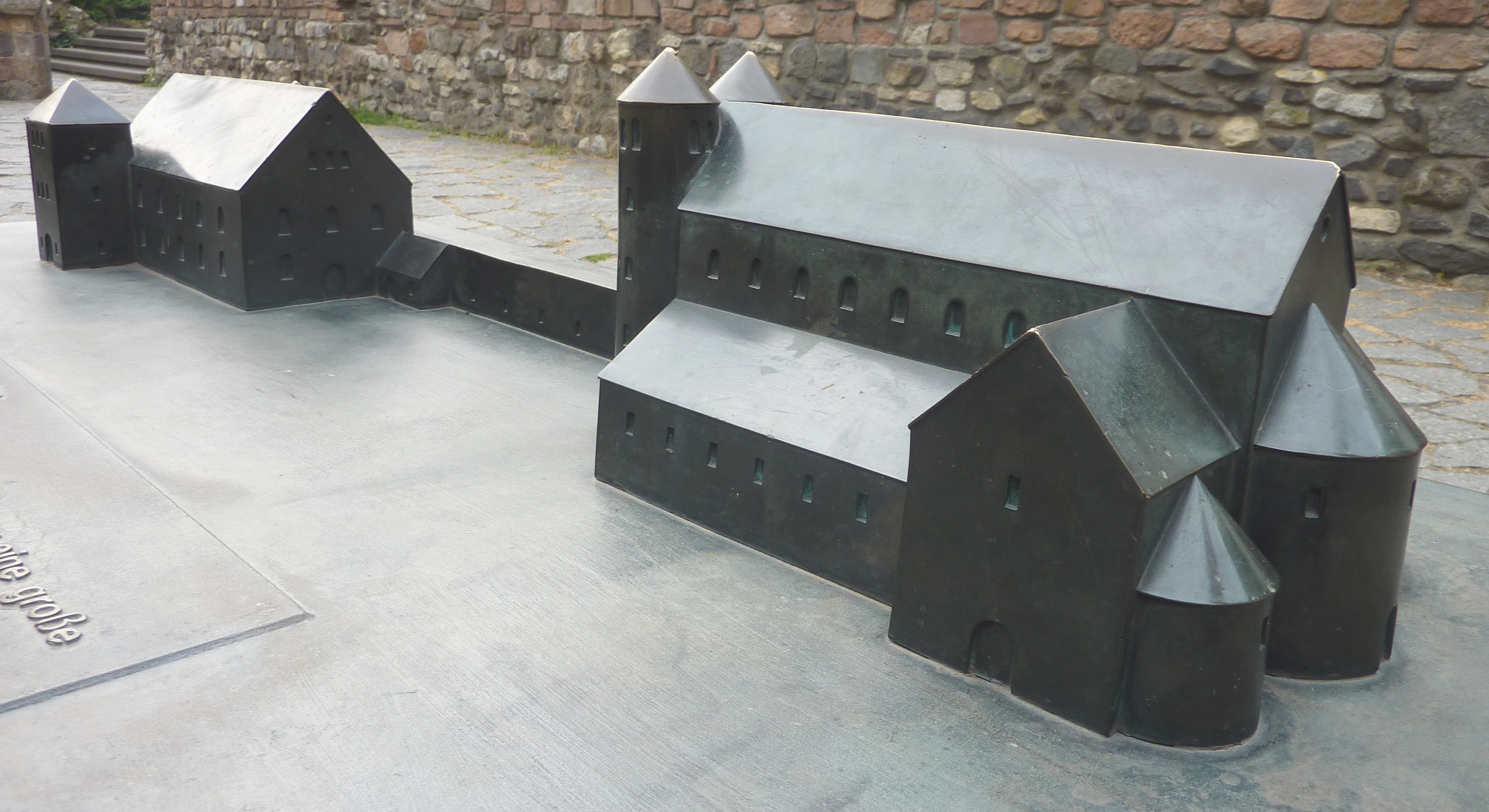
Model of the Royal Pfalz at Frankfurt with the Salvator palace chapel from the 9th century, in the background the main house, used from the 8th to 11th centuries. Today, Frankfurt Cathedral stands on the site of the palace chapel; the foundations of the aula regia can be seen as an excavation. The cathedral served as the location of elections (and sometimes coronations) of the kings and emperors of the Holy Roman Empire since 1147.

At a minimum, a pfalz consisted of a palas with its Great Hall or Aula Regia, an imperial chapel (Pfalzkapelle) and an estate (Gutshof). It was here that kings and emperors carried out the business of state, held their imperial court sessions, where they met with the greats of the empire at court days (Hoftag) and celebrated important church festivals. The most important of them were administered by a count palatine, who executed jurisdiction in the region in the emperor's stead. The most powerful of these counts, the Count palatine of the Rhine, would eventually rise to the title of Prince-elector of the Electoral Palatinate.

The pfalzen that the rulers visited varied depending on their function. Especially important were those palaces in which the kings spent the winter (winter palaces or Winterpfalzen), where they spent several months and which therefore had to provide considerable resources and comfort, while in the summer they often only stayed for a shorter time while spending much time traveling across the country, including military campaigns, often using tent camps where there were no palaces, monasteries or cities. Other important palaces were the festival palaces (Festtagspfalzen), Easter being the most important and celebrated, at Easter palaces (Osterpfalzen such as Quedlinburg). The larger palaces were often in towns that had special rights (e.g. imperial immediacy), but could also be seats of Bishop's palaces or imperial abbeys. The Palace of Aachen, greatly enlarged and expanded by Charlemagne in the 790s, enjoyed a certain exceptional status during his later reign: The first post-antique "Roman Emperor" continued to spend the summers on military campaigns, but preferred the Aachen Pfalz for the rest of the season because it had hot springs that alleviated his rheumatism. Therefore, 26 stays are documented and after 795 he only stayed in other places three times during the winter. Although it can still not be called a permanent residence, Aachen is referred to as his “favorite palace”. In the complex's Palatine Chapel, today the rotunda of Aachen Cathedral, more than 30 Roman-German kings, who saw themselves as the direct successors to Charlemagne, were crowned over a period of 600 years in front of the gold shrine with his relics.

In the Hohenstaufen era of the Roman-German kingdom, important imperial princes began to demonstrate their claims to power by building their own pfalzen. Important examples of these include Henry the Lion's Dankwarderode Castle in Brunswick and the Wartburg above Eisenach in Thuringia, built by the Thuringian count Louis the Springer.

== End of the Pfalzen ==
In the middle of the 13th century, after the fall of the Hohenstaufens, the royal power temporarily lapsed during the interregnum. One weak king after another was elected, but no one was able to exercise sovereign power. Princes and bishops tried to expand their territories. They oppressed less powerful nobles, fought the urban rulers (patricians and guilds), illegally seized imperial fiefdoms, introduced customs duties, new taxes and even royal regalia. Feuds, the law of the fist and robber barons escalated. In this situation, the barely fortified pfalzen no longer offered sufficient security to the German kings. Most were abandoned, repurposed by cities or local princes, disappeared under new development or fell into disrepair.

Instead of the pfalzen, the heavily fortified imperial castles were built, which - unlike the pfalzen, which were usually located in towns, lowlands, valleys or on river banks - were often hilltop castles like Nuremberg Castle or Trifels Castle. Kings also liked to stay in free imperial cities loyal to them, which had long since surpassed the old imperial abbeys in prosperity. The ruling patricians of these cities not only entertained the kings generously, but - like the Augsburg merchant and banker Jakob Fugger - financed their wars with huge loans.

== List of Holy Roman Imperial palaces ==
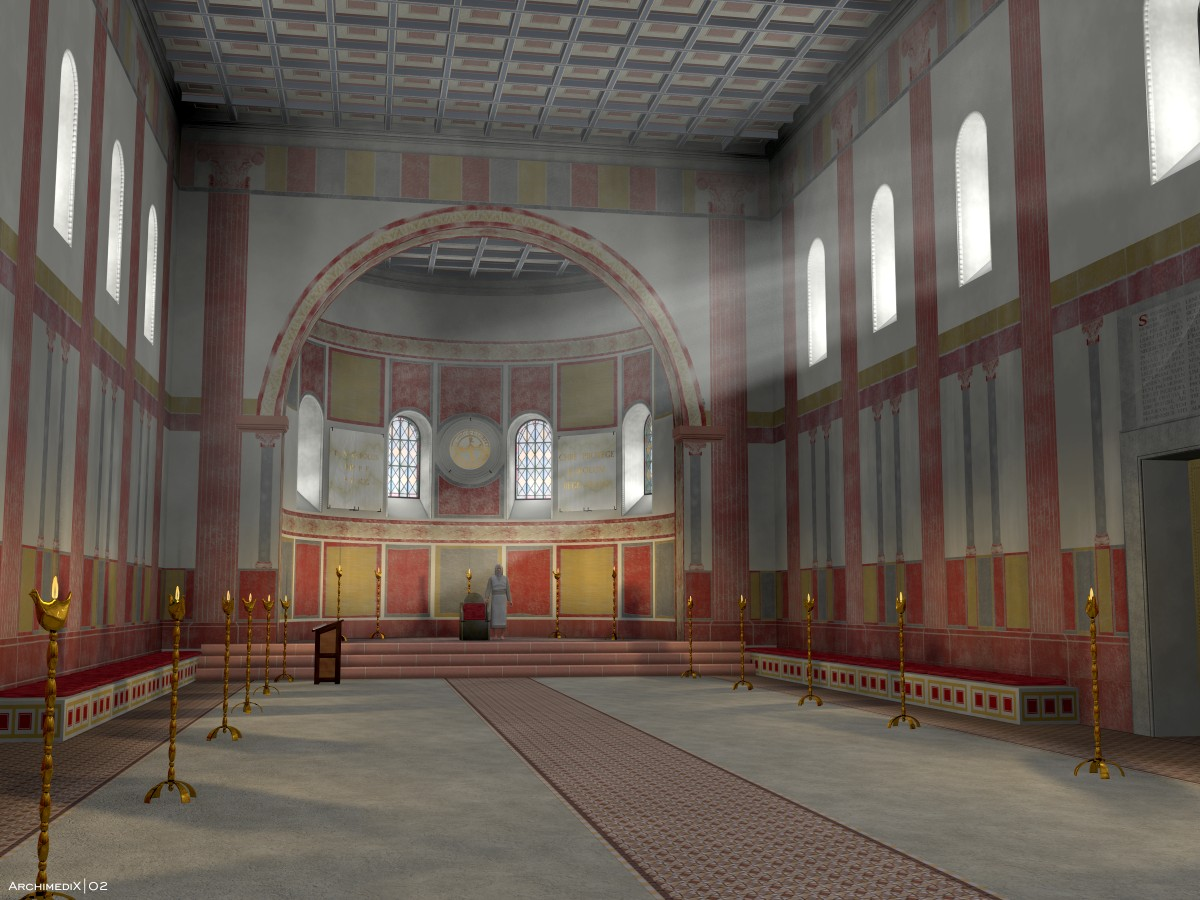
Digital reconstruction of the aula regia of Ingelheim Imperial Palace (around 790)

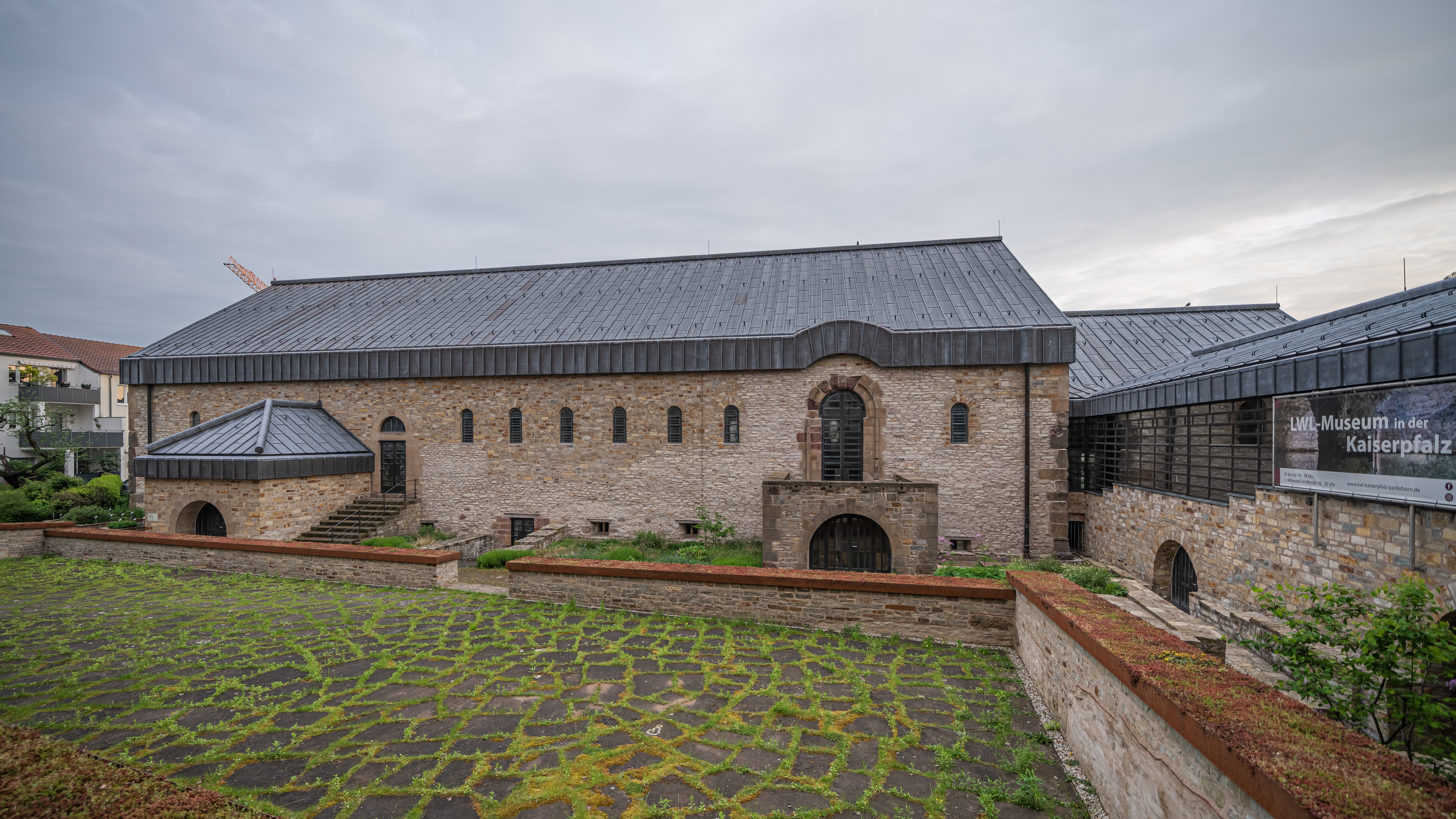
The reconstructed aula regia of the Paderborn pfalz, built around 1015. The lighter stones and the foundations are original.

Examples of surviving imperial palaces may be found in the town of Goslar and at Düsseldorf-Kaiserswerth.

- Aachen
- Adelberg
- Aibling
- Albisheim
- Altenburg
- Altötting
- Alzey
- Amorbach
- Andernach
- Ansbach
- Arneburg
- Arnstadt
- Aufhausen
- Augsburg
- Baden-Baden
- Balgstädt
- Bamberg
- Bardowick
- Batzenhofen
- Belgern
- Beratzhausen
- Berstadt
- Biebrich
- Bierstadt
- Bingen am Rhein
- Böckelheim
- Bodfeld
- Bodman
- Bonn
- Boppard
- Boyneburg
- Brandenburg
- Braunschweig
- Breisach
- Breitenbach
- Breitingen
- Bremen
- Bruchsal
- Brüggen
- Bürgel
- Bürstadt
- Buxtehude
- Calbe
- Cham
- Eger (now Cheb)
- Cochem
- Corvey
- Dahlen
- Derenburg
- Diedenhofen
- Dollendorf
- Donaueschingen
- Donaustauf
- Donauwörth
- Dornburg
- Dortmund
- Duisburg
- Düren
- Durlach
- Ebersberg
- Ebrach
- Ebsdorf
- Eckartsberga
- Eichstätt
- Eisenberg
- Eisfeld
- Eisleben
- Elten
- Eresburg
- Erfurt
- Ermschwerd
- Erwitte
- Eschwege
- Essen
- Esslingen am Neckar
- Ettenstatt
- Etterzhausen
- Eußerthal
- Flamersheim
- Forchheim
- Frankfurt am Main
- Freiburg im Breisgau
- Freising
- Fritzlar
- Frohse an der Elbe
- Fulda
- Fürth
- Gandersheim
- Gebesee
- Gehren
- Geldersheim
- Gelnhausen
- Germersheim
- Gernrode
- Gernsheim
- Gerstungen
- Giebichenstein
- Gieboldehausen
- Giengen
- Göppingen
- Goslar
- Gottern
- Grebenau
- Grone
- Großseelheim
- Günzburg
- Gustedt
- Hahnbach an der Vils
- Haina
- Halberstadt
- Halle
- Hammerstein
- Harsefeld
- Harzburg
- Haselbach
- Hasselfelde
- Haßloch
- Havelberg
- Heidingsfeld
- Heilbronn
- Heiligenberg
- Heiligenstadt
- Heimsheim
- Helfta
- Helmstedt
- Hemau
- Herbrechtingen
- Herford
- Herrenbreitungen
- Hersfeld
- Herstelle
- Herzberg
- Heßloch
- Hildesheim
- Hilwartshausen
- Hirsau
- Hirschaid
- Hohenaltheim
- Hohenstaufen
- Hohentwiel
- Hohnstedt
- Hollenstedt
- Hornburg
- Ilsenburg
- Imbshausen
- Ingelheim
- Ingolstadt
- Inning
- Kaiserslautern
- Kaiserswerth
- Kamba
- Kassel
- Kastel
- Kaufungen
- Kayna
- Kelheim
- Kelsterbach
- Kessel
- Kirchberg
- Kirchen
- Kirchohsen
- Kissenbrück
- Kissingen
- Kitzingen
- Koblenz
- Köln
- Komburg
- Königsdahlum
- Königslutter
- Konstanz
- Kostheim
- Kraisdorf
- Kreuznach
- Ladenburg
- Lampertheim
- Langen
- Langenau
- Langenzenn
- Laufen
- Lauffen am Neckar
- Lautertal (Oberfranken)
- Leisnig
- Leitzkau
- Lichtenberg
- Limburg an der Haardt
- Lingen
- Lippeham
- Lippspringe
- Lonnerstadt
- Lonsheim
- Lorch
- Lorsch
- Lustenau
- Lügde
- Lüneburg
- Maastricht
- Magdeburg
- Mainz
- Markgröningen
- Mecklenburg
- Meißen
- Memleben
- Memmingen
- Mengen
- Mering
- Merseburg
- Minden
- Mindersdorf
- Mirsdorf
- Mögeldorf
- Moosburg
- Mörfelden
- Mosbach
- Mötsch
- Mühlhausen
- Münden
- Münnerstadt
- Münster
- Münstereifel
- Nabburg
- Nanstein
- Nattheim
- Naumburg
- Neuburg
- Neudingen
- Neuenburg Castle (Freyburg)
- Neuhausen
- Neuss
- Niederalteich
- Nienburg
- Nierstein
- Nijmegen
- Nordhausen
- Northeim
- Nürnberg
- Nußdorf
- Obertheres
- Ochsenfurt
- Oferdingen
- Ohrdruf
- Ohrum
- Oppenheim
- Oschersleben
- Osnabrück
- Osterhausen
- Osterhofen
- Osterode
- Paderborn
- Passau
- Pegau
- Peiting
- Pforzheim
- Pöhlde
- Pondorf
- Prüm
- Quedlinburg
- Ramspau
- Rasdorf
- Regensburg
- Rehme
- Reibersdorf
- Reichenau
- Rheinbach
- Riekofen
- Ritteburg
- Rochlitz
- Rodach
- Roding
- Rohr
- Rommelhausen
- Rösebeck
- Rosenburg
- Rothenburg ob der Tauber
- Rottweil
- Rüdesheim
- Rülzheim
- Saalfeld
- Säckingen
- Salz
- Salzwedel
- Samswegen
- Sankt Goar
- Sasbach am Kaiserstuhl
- Schattbuch
- Schienen
- Schierling
- Schöningen
- Schüller
- Schwäbisch Gmünd
- Schwäbisch Hall
- Schwarzenbruck
- Schwarzrheindorf
- See, Gem. Lupburg
- Seehausen
- Seidmannsdorf
- Seinstedt
- Seligenstadt
- Sinzig
- Siptenfelde
- Soest
- Sohlingen
- Sömmeringen
- Sontheim an der Brenz
- Speyer
- Stadtamhof
- Staffelsee
- Stallbaum
- Steele
- Stegaurach
- Tangermünde
- Tauberbischofsheim
- Tennstedt
- Thangelstedt
- Thingau
- Thorr
- Thüngen
- Tilleda
- Treben
- Trebur
- Treis
- Trier
- Trifels
- Überlingen
- Ulm
- Utrecht
- Vaihingen an der Enz
- Velden
- Verden
- Vilich
- Villmar
- Vlatten
- Völklingen
- Vreden
- Wadgassen
- Wahren
- Waiblingen
- Walbeck
- Waldsassen
- Walldorf
- Wallhausen
- Wallhausen
- Wechmar
- Weilburg
- Weinheim
- Weinsberg
- Weisenau
- Weißenburg
- Werben
- Werden
- Werla
- Wiedenbrück
- Wiehe
- Wiesbaden
- Wiesloch
- Wildeshausen
- Wimpfen
- Winterbach
- Wölfis
- Worms
- Würzburg
- Wurzen
- Xanten
- Zeitz
- Zülpich
- Zusmarshausen
- Zutphen

== See also ==
- Palace
- Palas
- Imperial castle (Reichsburg)

== Literature ==
- Adolf Eggers: Der königliche Grundbesitz im 10. und beginnenden 11. Jahrhundert, H. Böhlaus Nachfolger, 1909
- Lutz Fenske: Deutsche Königspfalzen: Beiträge zu ihrer historischen und archäologischen Erforschung, Zentren herrschaftlicher Repräsentation im Hochmittelalter: Geschichte Architektur und Zeremoniell, by the Max Planck Institute of History, Vandenhoeck & Ruprecht, 1963, ISBN 978-3525365212
- Paul Grimm: Stand und Aufgaben des archäologischen Pfalzenforschung in den Bezirken Halle und Magdeburg, Akademie-Verlag, 1961
- Günther Binding: Deutsche Königspfalzen, Von Karl dem Großen bis Friedrich II. (765–1240). Darmstadt, 1996, ISBN 3-534-12548-7.
- Alexander Thon: Barbarossaburg, Kaiserpfalz, Königspfalz oder Casimirschloss? Studien zu Relevanz und Gültigkeit des Begriffes „Pfalz“ im Hochmittelalter anhand des Beispiels (Kaisers-)Lautern. In: Kaiserslauterer Jahrbuch für pfälzische Geschichte und Volkskunde. Kaiserslautern, 1.2001, ISSN 1619-7283, pp. 109–144.
- Alexander Thon: ... ut nostrum regale palatium infra civitatem vel in burgo eorum non hedificent. Studies of relevance and validity to do with the term "Pfalz" for the research of castles of the 12th and 13th centuries in: Burgenbau im 13. Jahrhundert. pub. by the Wartburg-Gesellschaft for the research of castles and palaces along with the Germanic National Museum. Research into castles and palaces. Vol. 7. Deutscher Kunstverlag, Munich, 2002, ISBN 3-422-06361-7, pp. 45–72.
- Gerhard Streich: Burg und Kirche während des deutschen Mittelalters. Untersuchungen zur Sakraltopographie von Pfalzen, Burgen und Herrensitzen, 2 Vols., published by the Constance Working Group for Medieval History, Thorbecke-Verlag, 1984, ISBN 978-3-7995-6689-6.
