= Palatine colossi =

Pair of colossal Roman statues in Parma

The Palatine Colossi

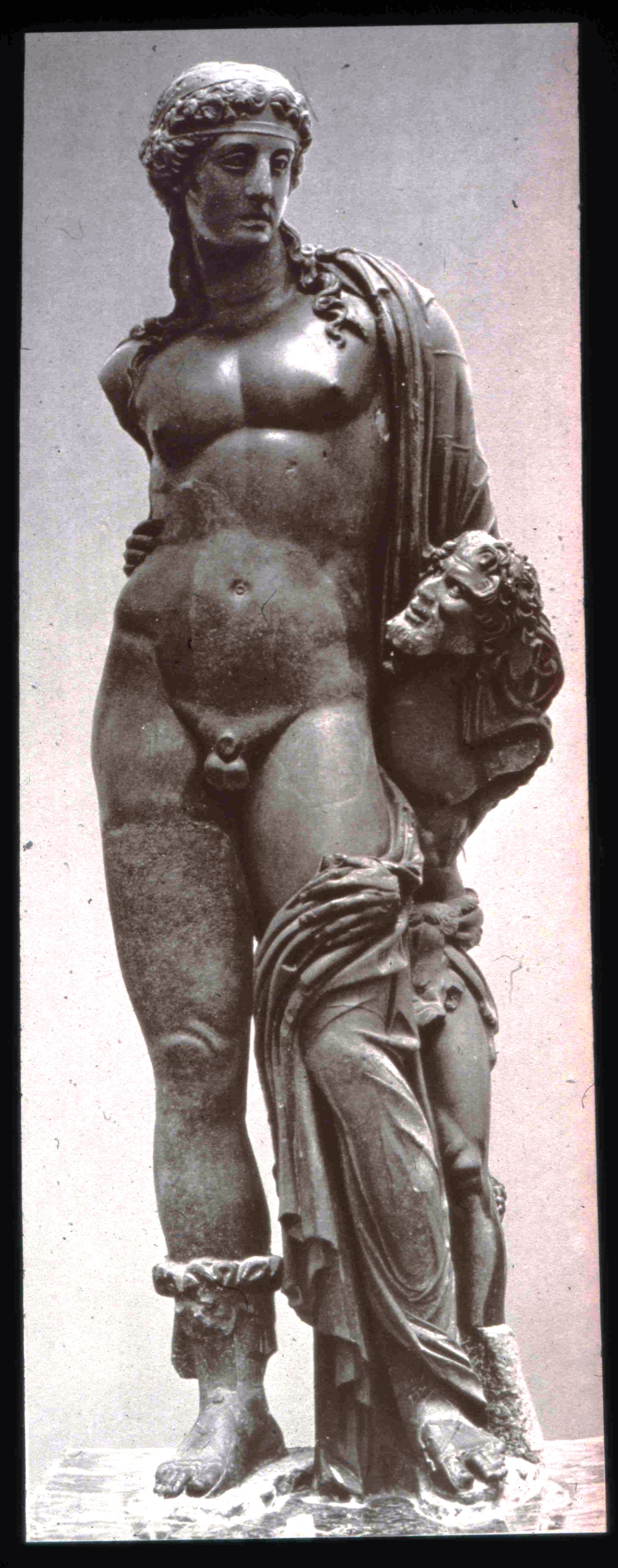
Dionysus supported by a satyr

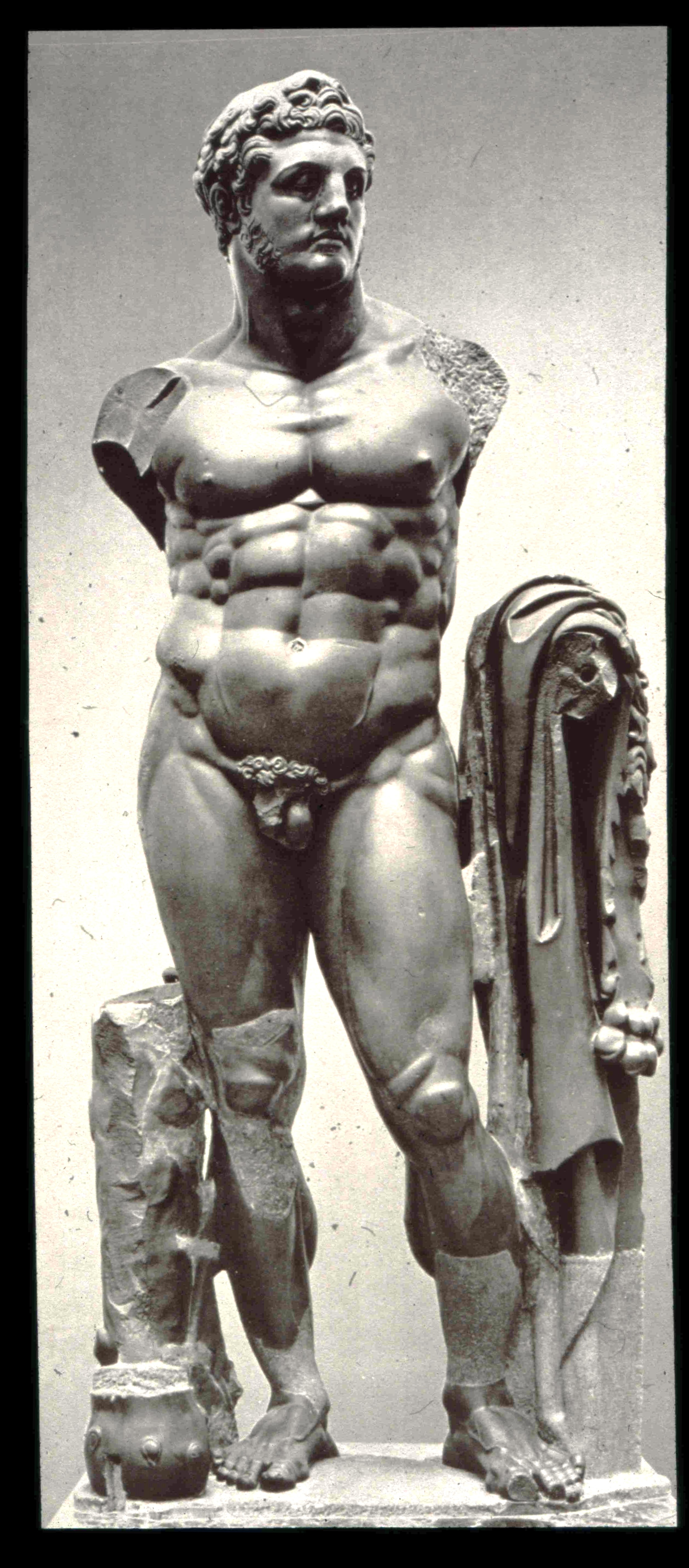
Hercules with the skin of the Nemean lion

The Palatine Colossi are a pair of colossal Roman statues depicting Hercules and Dionysus supported by a satyr. Carved from Egyptian greywacke, traditionally described as "basalt" and identified with the ancient Egyptian bekhen stone, they are dated to the late first or early second century AD. The statues were discovered in April 1724 in the Basilica of the Domus Flavia on the Palatine Hill in Rome. They are displayed in the Sala Ovale of the Galleria nazionale di Parma.

Although the colossi have often been associated with the Aula Regia, the principal audience hall of Domitian's palace, they were recovered in the adjacent Basilica and probably in a secondary position. Their original placement within the palace remains uncertain.

== Description ==
The Dionysus group, inventory number 969, is 3.55 m (11.6 ft) high. It depicts the youthful, intoxicated god leaning upon a smaller satyr, who supports him at the waist and thigh. Dionysus wears an himation over his left arm and lower body; his hair is bound with a fillet and falls in curls over his chest and shoulders. The satyr wears an animal skin and stands beside a support shaped as a vat filled with grapes. The composition adapts a late Classical sculptural type influenced by the work of Praxiteles.

The Hercules, inventory number 970, is 3.65 m (12.0 ft) high. The hero stands with his weight on his right leg and his head turned to the left. He originally held his club in his right hand, while the skin of the Nemean lion rests on his bent left arm and falls to the ground as a support. His missing left hand probably held the apples of the Hesperides. The statue belongs to the sculptural type conventionally known as the Albertini Hercules, derived from a fourth-century BC model, probably in bronze.

The colossi are carved from a dark greenish-grey greywacke quarried at Wadi Hammamat in Egypt's Eastern Desert. Roberta Belli Pasqua identifies the material with the bekhen stone known from ancient Egyptian inscriptions. Although it was commonly described as "basalt" in antiquarian literature and in eighteenth-century records concerning the colossi, it is a fine-grained sedimentary sandstone rather than a volcanic basalt. Its fine texture was suited to detailed carving and could approximate the dark appearance of bronze. In Roman sculpture, greywacke was used for works associated with Egypt and, particularly during the first century AD, for imperial portraits and commissions.

Both sculptures were fragmentary when excavated and contain extensive restorations. The Dionysus group had suffered particularly severe damage to the torso and lower limbs. Its additions include parts made from Apuan marble and sandstone, together with restorations in pozzolanic stucco, plaster and scagliola. The Hercules was more complete, though portions of its legs and lion skin were restored and metal supports were inserted behind the figure. The surviving repairs represent several campaigns extending from the eighteenth century to the reconstruction of the statues after the Second World War.

== Date and original setting ==
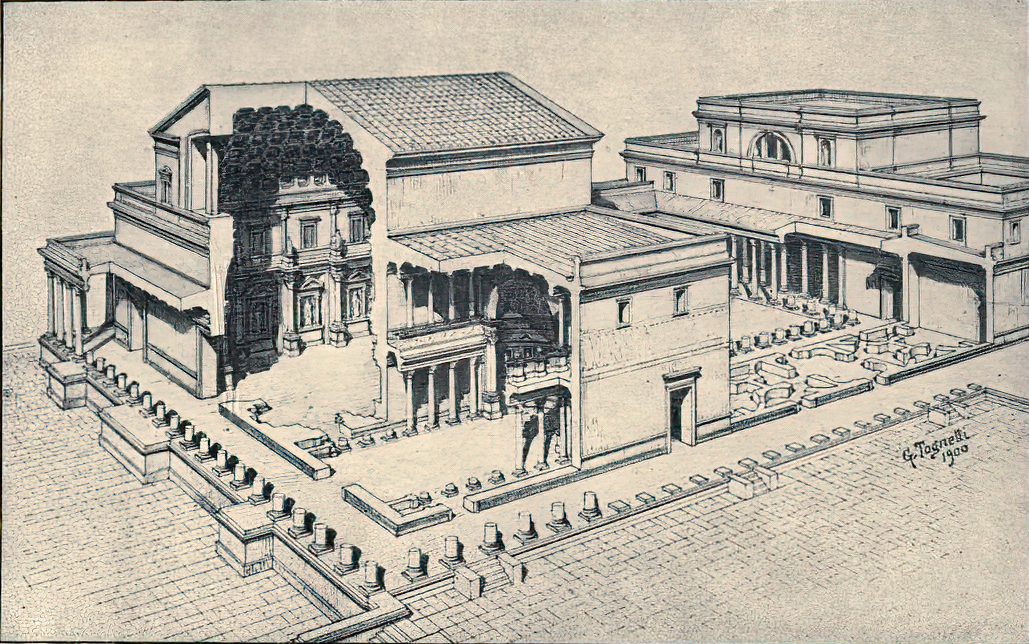
A 1900 speculative reconstruction of the Domus Flavia, with the great Aula Regia and the western room in which the colossi were excavated.

Belli Pasqua dates both sculptures to the late first or early second century AD. Their association with Domitian's palace has supported a date in the reign of Domitian, but Belli Pasqua cautions that the archaeological context alone is not decisive and that stylistic comparisons also permit a date in the early second century. She considered the statues' shared material, colossal scale, provenance and stylistic features evidence that they were produced by the same workshop.

An older reconstruction placed the statues in niches in the Aula Regia together with a larger series of colossi. Marini Calvani noted, however, that the eighteenth-century excavator Francesco Bianchini recorded their discovery outside a lateral door of the great hall, in the room to its west, identified as the Basilica. She interpreted their position as secondary and suggested that they might have fallen from a gallery above. Their size nevertheless indicates that they were designed in relation to one of the giant architectural orders of Domitian's palace.

Marini Calvani interprets Hercules and Dionysus as a contrasting pair, combining the physical energy of the hero with the relaxed posture of the god. Belli Pasqua notes that greywacke was particularly associated with imperial patronage during the first century AD. Although she cautions that the original decorative program associated with the statues cannot be reconstructed with certainty, she interprets their imagery and material as consistent with the ideological decoration of Domitian's palace. Belli Pasqua and Rita Sassu have subsequently proposed that the Hercules may be an idealized portrait of Domitian, presenting the emperor in the guise of Hercules after his labors.

== Discovery and later history ==
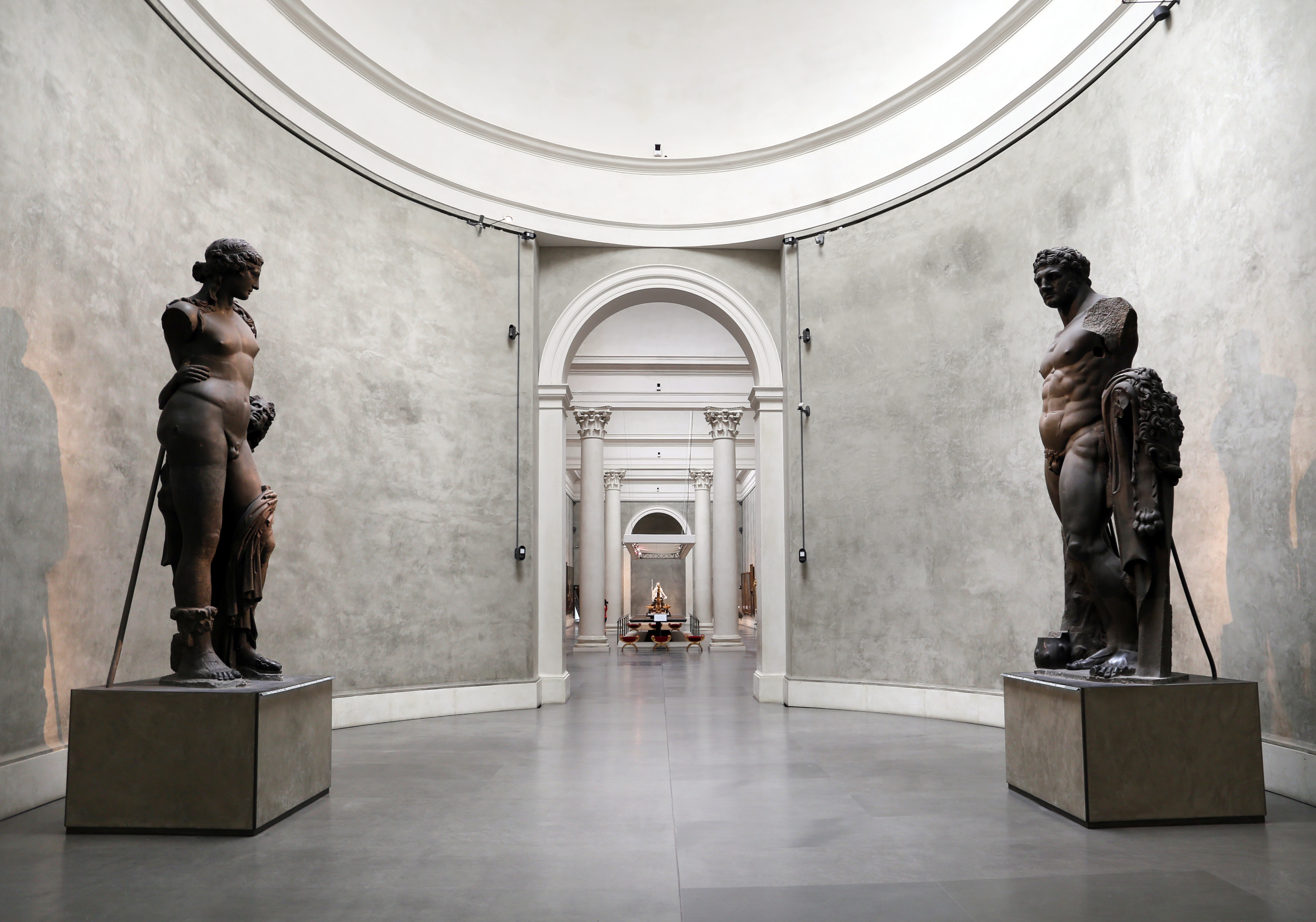
The colossi displayed in the Sala Ovale of the Galleria nazionale di Parma

The statues were found during excavations in the Farnese Gardens begun in 1720 by Francesco Farnese, Duke of Parma, and directed by Bianchini. They were uncovered on the floor of the Basilica in April 1724. Gaetano Piccini recorded the excavation in a drawing showing the fragmentary statues lying on the ground, while Pier Leone Ghezzi produced drawings of their heads.

The colossi were removed from Rome within months of their discovery. Taking advantage of the papal conclave of 1724, the duke's agents arranged their shipment by water to the Ducal Palace of Colorno, where they arrived in October. Bianchini was instructed to find stone suitable for their restoration, but searches in Rome and Florence failed to produce material matching the ancient stone. The court sculptor Giuliano Mozzani subsequently worked on the statues. Because the Dionysus was more severely fragmented, only the Hercules underwent substantial restoration at that time.

The statues were prepared for shipment to Naples with other parts of the Farnese collection in the 1730s, but the military occupation of the duchy prevented their departure. They remained in pieces in the gardens at Colorno. In 1757 the court architect Ennemond Alexandre Petitot designed two pedestals, each approximately 8.2 m (27 ft) high, for their display near the entrance to the park. Only the better-preserved Hercules was raised onto its pedestal; the Dionysus remained on the ground.

During the French administration of Parma, Pietro De Lama and the administrator Médéric Louis Élie Moreau de Saint-Méry helped prevent the colossi from being removed to Paris with other works from the ducal collections. They were transferred from Colorno to Parma between 1821 and 1822 by order of Marie Louise, Duchess of Parma, and installed in the purpose-built Sala Ovale of the ducal gallery.

During the Second World War, damage to the Palazzo della Pilotta and concerns over aerial bombardment led to the statues being removed from their pedestals and buried beneath the building near the Farnese staircase. They were excavated after the war and returned to the Sala Ovale in 1946. Their metal supports were altered and their masonry pedestals lowered during the reinstallation.

== Sources ==
- Belli Pasqua, Roberta (1995). Sculture di età romana in "basalto". Xenia Antiqua (in Italian). Vol. 2 (supplemento). Rome: L'Erma di Bretschneider. ISBN 887062885X.
- Belli Pasqua, Roberta; Sassu, Rita (2019). "Eracle fra mito e politica: Considerazioni sull'impiego dell'immagine dell'Alcide come strumento di legittimazione del potere nel mondo classico". Mediterraneo Antico (in Italian). 22 (1–2): 423–452.
- Marini Calvani, Mirella (1997). "I Colossi dal Palatino". In Fornari Schianchi, Lucia (ed.). Galleria nazionale di Parma: catalogo delle opere dall'Antico al Cinquecento (in Italian). Franco Maria Ricci. pp. CXI–CXXIII. ISBN 9788821609343.
- Miranda, Silvana (2000). Francesco Bianchini e lo scavo farnesiano del Palatino (1720–1729). Pubblicazioni della Facoltà di Lettere e Filosofia dell'Università di Pavia (in Italian). Vol. 92. Florence: La Nuova Italia. ISBN 9788822140081.
- Riccomini, Anna Maria (2005). Scavi a Veleia: L'archeologia a Parma tra Settecento e Ottocento (in Italian). Bologna: CLUEB. ISBN 8849125992.
