= Greywacke =

Sandstone with angular grains in a clay-fine matrix

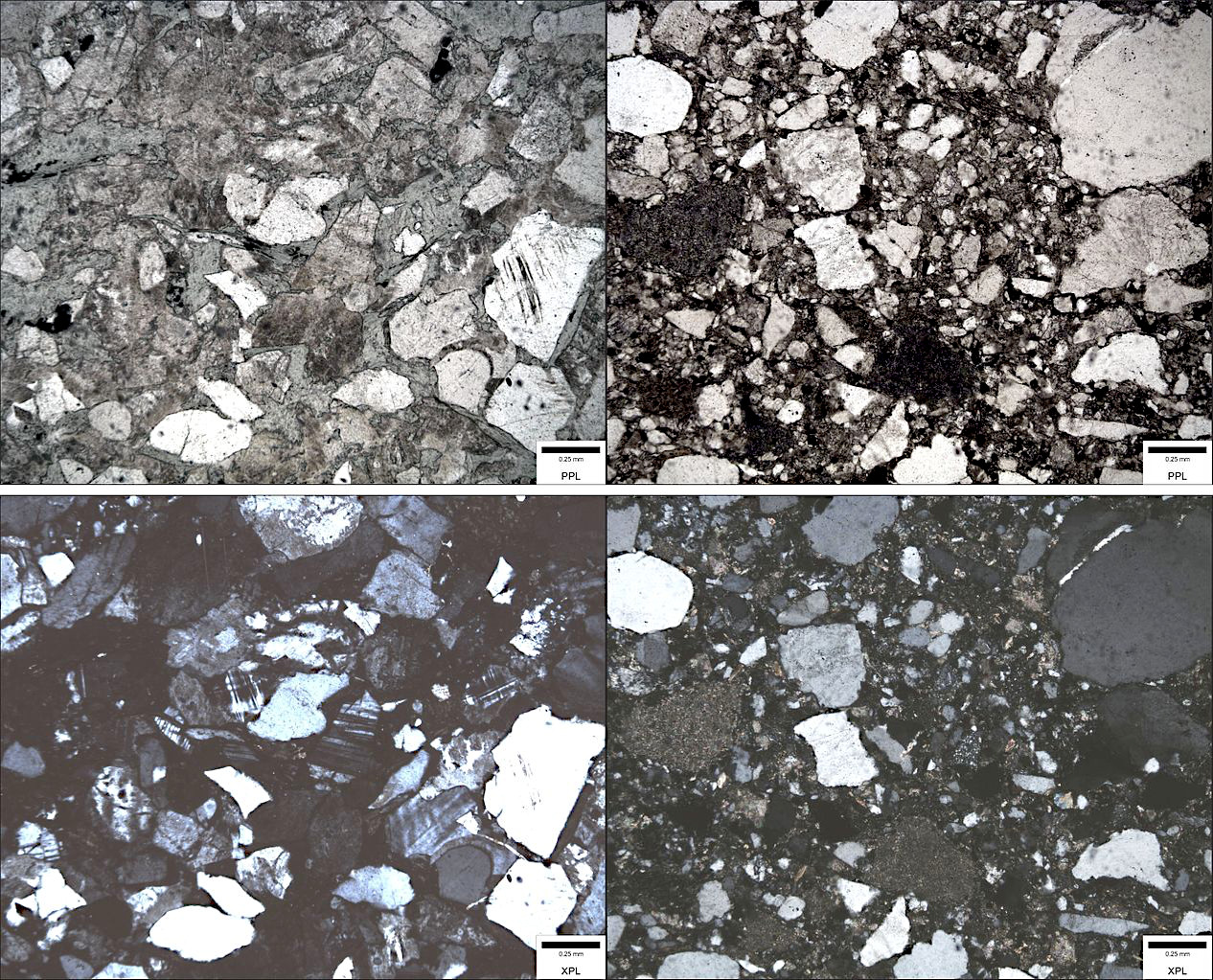
Photomicrographs of feldspathic (L) and lithic (R) greywacke. The top images are in plane-polarized light; the bottom images are in cross-polarized light. Cements fill the pore spaces.

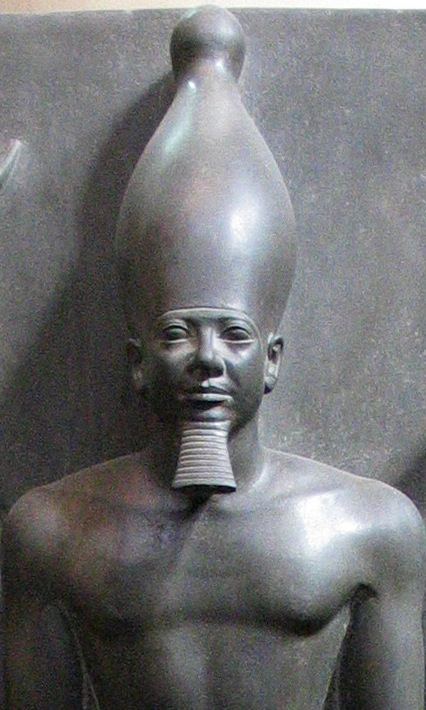
Closeup of Pharaoh Menkaure's greywacke statue, 25th century BCE, from the Egyptian Museum in Cairo

Greywacke or graywacke (German: Grauwacke 'a grey, earthy rock') is a variety of sandstone generally characterized by its hardness (6–7 on Mohs scale), dark color, and poorly sorted angular grains of quartz, feldspar, and small rock fragments or sand-size lithic fragments set in a compact, clay-fine matrix. It is a texturally immature sedimentary rock generally found in Paleozoic strata. The larger grains can be sand- to gravel-sized, and matrix materials generally constitute more than 15 percent of the rock by volume.

== Formation ==
The origin of greywacke was unknown until turbidity currents and turbidites were understood, since, according to the normal laws of sedimentation, gravel, sand and mud should not be laid down together. Geologists now attribute its formation to submarine avalanches or strong turbidity currents. These actions churn sediment and cause mixed-sediment slurries, in which the resulting deposits may exhibit a variety of sedimentary features. Supporting the turbidity origin theory is the fact that deposits of greywacke are found on the edges of the continental shelves, at the bottoms of oceanic trenches, and at the bases of mountain formational areas. They also occur in association with black shales of deep-sea origin.

As a rule, greywackes do not contain fossils, but organic remains may be common in the finer beds associated with them. Their component particles are usually not very rounded or polished, and the rocks have often been considerably indurated by recrystallization, such as the introduction of interstitial silica. In some districts, the greywackes are cleaved, but they show phenomena of this kind much less perfectly than the slates.

Although the group is so diverse that it is difficult to characterize mineralogically, it has a well-established place in petrographical classifications because these peculiar composite arenaceous deposits are very frequent among Silurian and Cambrian rocks, and are less common in Mesozoic or Cenozoic strata. Their essential features are their gritty character and their complex composition. By increasing metamorphism, greywackes frequently pass into mica-schists, chloritic schists and sedimentary gneisses.

=== Varieties ===
The term "greywacke" can be confusing, since it can refer to either the immature (rock fragment) aspect of the rock or its fine-grained (clay) component.

Greywackes are mostly grey, brown, yellow, or black, dull-colored sandy rocks that may occur in thick or thin beds along with shales and limestones. Some varieties include feldspathic greywacke, rich in feldspar, and lithic greywacke, rich in other tiny rock fragments. They can contain a very great variety of minerals, the principal ones being quartz, orthoclase and plagioclase feldspars, calcite, iron oxides and graphitic, carbonaceous matters, together with (in the coarser kinds) fragments of such rocks as felsite, chert, slate, gneiss, various schists, and quartzite. Among other minerals found in them are biotite, chlorite, tourmaline, epidote, apatite, garnet, hornblende, augite, sphene and pyrites. The cementing material may be siliceous or argillaceous and is sometimes calcareous.

== In geology and geography ==
Greywackes are abundant in Wales, the south of Scotland, the Longford-Down Massif in Ireland and the Lake District National Park of England; they compose the majority of the main Southern Alps that make up the backbone of New Zealand. Both feldspathic and lithic greywacke have been recognized in Ecca Group in South Africa.

Greywackes are also found in parts of the Eastern Desert east of the Nile. An important ancient source was Wadi Hammamat, on the route between Koptos and the Red Sea. The stone quarried there is a very fine-grained and compact greywacke composed principally of quartz, feldspar, plagioclase and epidote; it is generally dark greenish-grey, sometimes tending toward brown.

They were an early object of geological study in Britain where the Geological Society was founded in 1807, and excited much public interest in geology. Greywacke was interesting because it was found in many places in Britain and its occurrence in particular places was evidence of the pattern of geological strata that had been laid down.

== Uses ==
Greywacke was extensively used for vessels and sculpture in ancient Egypt and later in the Roman world. The greywacke of Wadi Hammamat is generally identified with the bekhen stone named in ancient Egyptian inscriptions, which record expeditions to obtain the material. Its fine grain and compact structure allowed detailed carving, while its dark colour could approximate the appearance of bronze. Roman examples range from small sculptures to colossal works; particularly large examples include the Palatine Colossi, carved for an imperial context in the late first or early second century AD.

In archaeological and antiquarian literature, Egyptian greywacke has frequently been described as "basalt", although it is a sedimentary rock rather than volcanic basalt. Early modern terminology for dark stones was inconsistent, and names such as basalto, pietra di paragone and related terms were applied to more than one material.

Aside from its structural uses, greywacke stone (or molds taken from it) is valuable to practitioners of traditional motion picture miniature photography, because due to its unusually mixed nature, it remains natural looking when portraying a wide range of miniature scale ratios, from 1:1 to as high as 1:600.

== Gallery ==
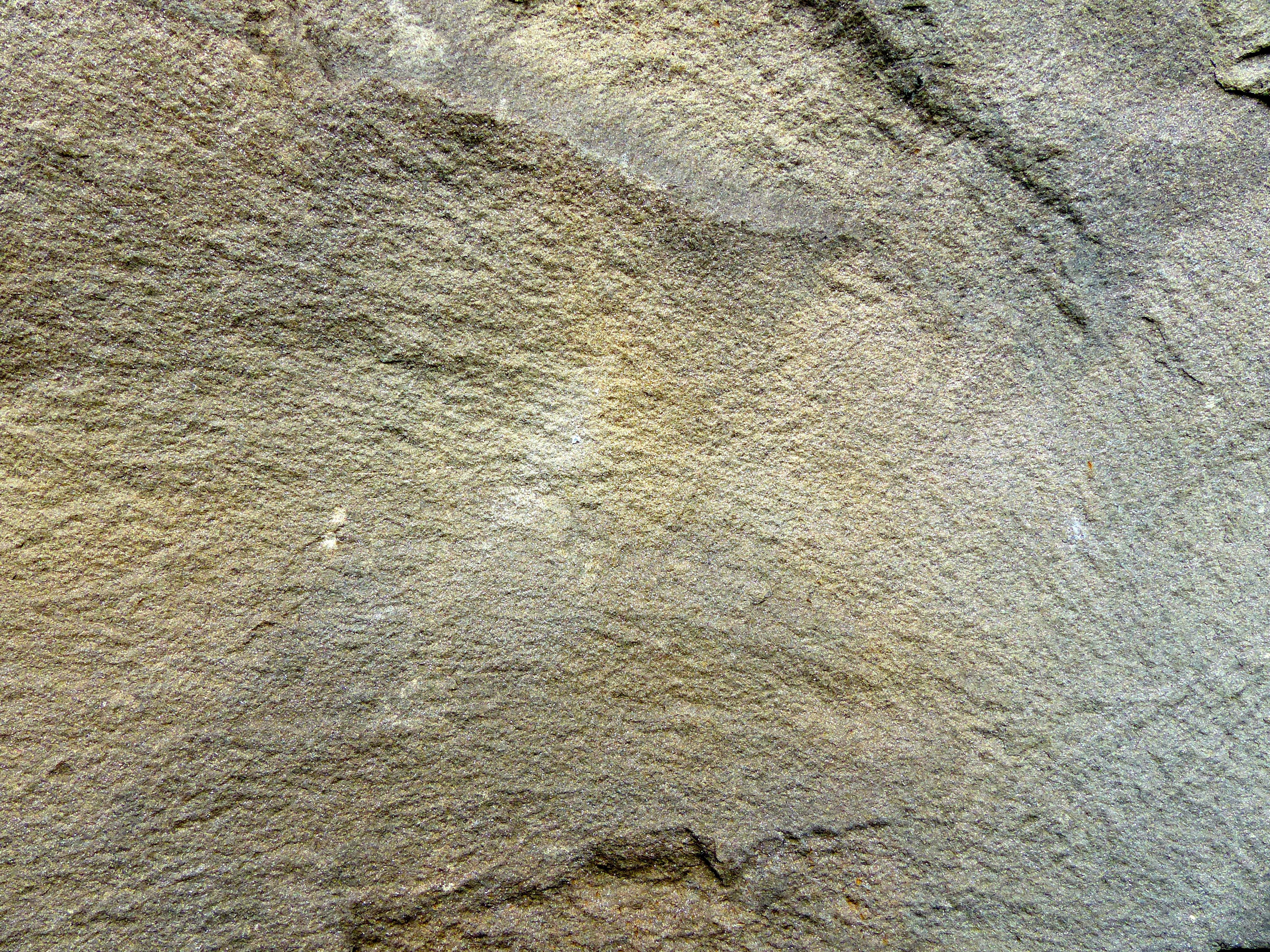
A greywacke rock

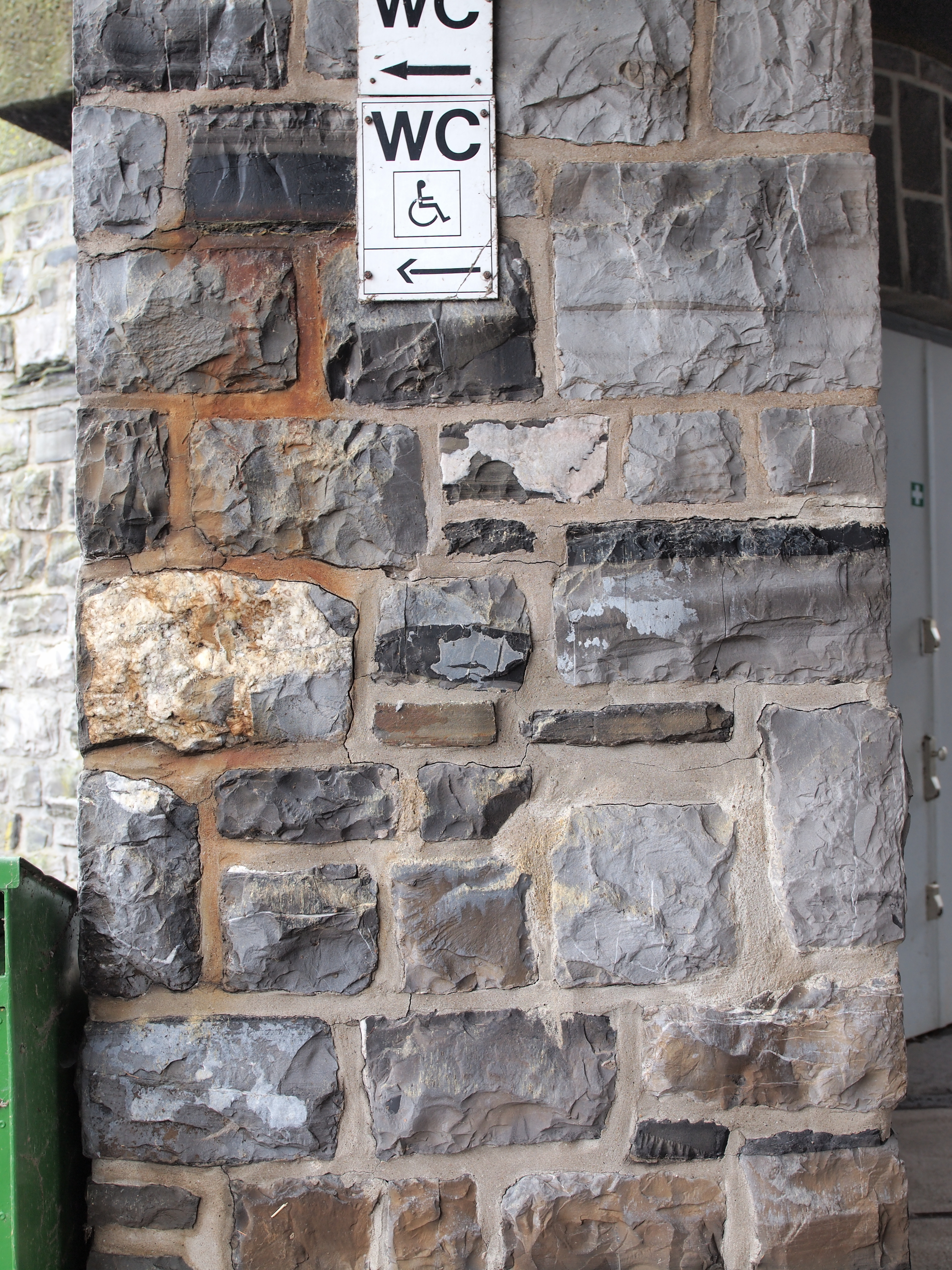
Wall of greywacke at Möhne Reservoir dam, Germany

== See also ==
- Greywacke zone
- Torlesse Greywacke
- Wackestone
