= Veronika Fischer =

German singer (born 1951)

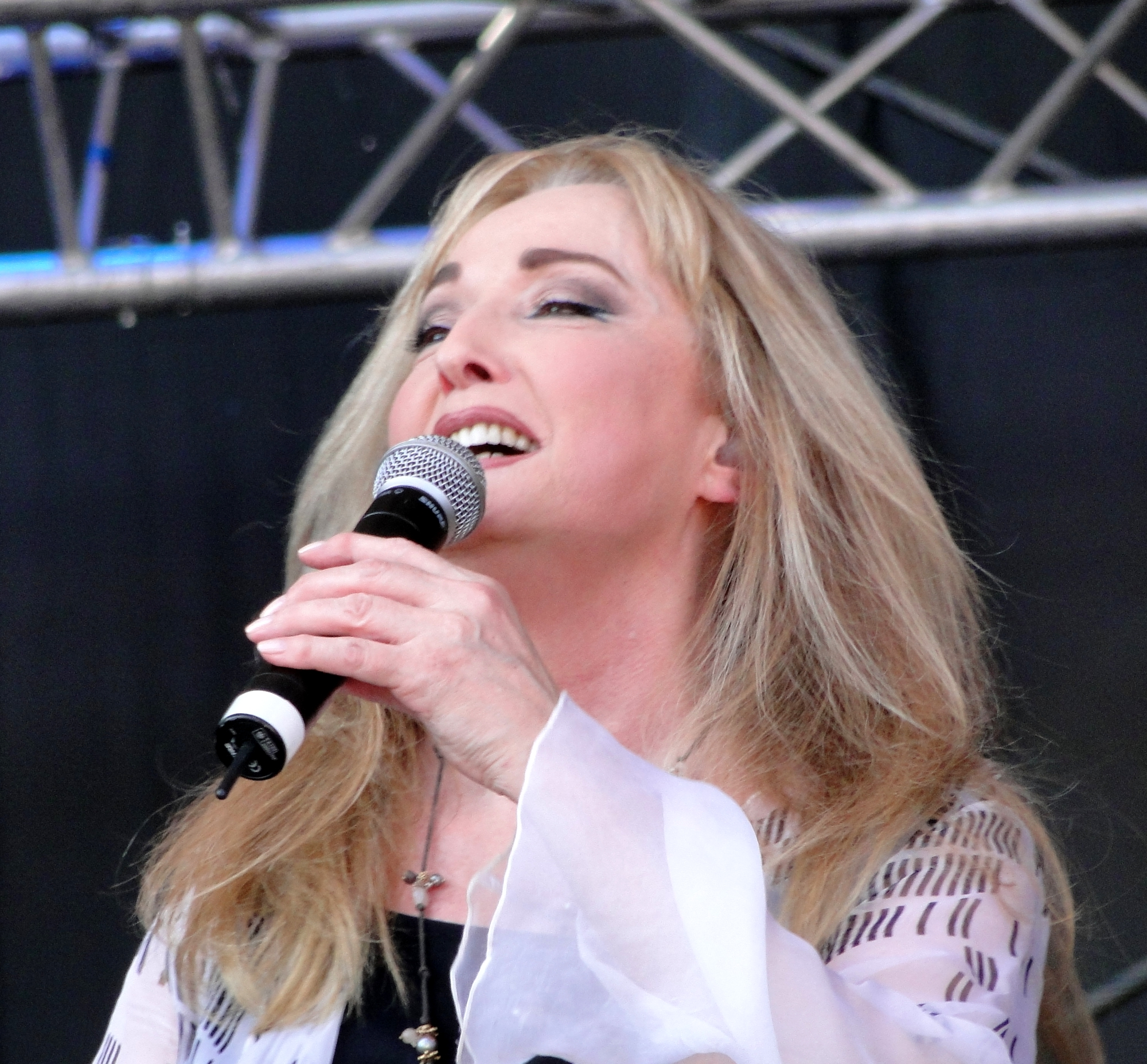
- Fischer performing in 2011

Background information
- Born: 28 July 1951 (age 75); Wölfis, Thuringia, East Germany
- Genres: Schlager, Pop
- Occupation: Singer
- Website: veronikafischer.de

Veronika Fischer, also called Vroni (born 28 July 1951), is a German singer.

== Life ==
Fischer was born in the Thuringian municipality of Wölfis (near Gotha). She began to study at the Hochschule für Musik Carl Maria von Weber in 1968 with Hanns Petersen. She also appeared with various bands such as the Fred-Herfter-Combo and 1970 with the Stern-Combo Meißen. In 1973 her first LP was released with the group Panta Rhei, which was jazz-oriented, among others Herbert Dreilich, Ed Swillms and Henning Protzmann, who later founded the group Karat. The titles Nachts and Blues were successful in hit parades like the Beatkiste.

Fischer graduated in music studies with the Staatsexamen as a soloist for chanson and musical. One year later, she founded the group Veronika Fischer & Band. In this volume, Franz Bartzsch (piano, keyboard, singing) was responsible for most compositions and arrangements. On the LP Veronika Fischer & Band, the guitarist and singer Johannes Biebl also contributed. In 1974 the blues appeared from the last opportunity, which was also released on numerous compilations. Her first solo album was released in 1975, when she also won the first place of the Year's Parade. Their next Amiga records sold more than 1.5 million times, making Fischer the most successful singer in East Germany. In 1977, Fischer's companionship split to start a solo career as 4 hp. Fischer formed a new band around Thomas Natschinski. From 1979, she worked again with Franz Bartzsch. At the end of the 1970s, she played with two albums of Reinhard Lakomy with music for children (the 1978 song title and Die Traumzauberbaum 1980). In 1979, her son Benjamin was born.

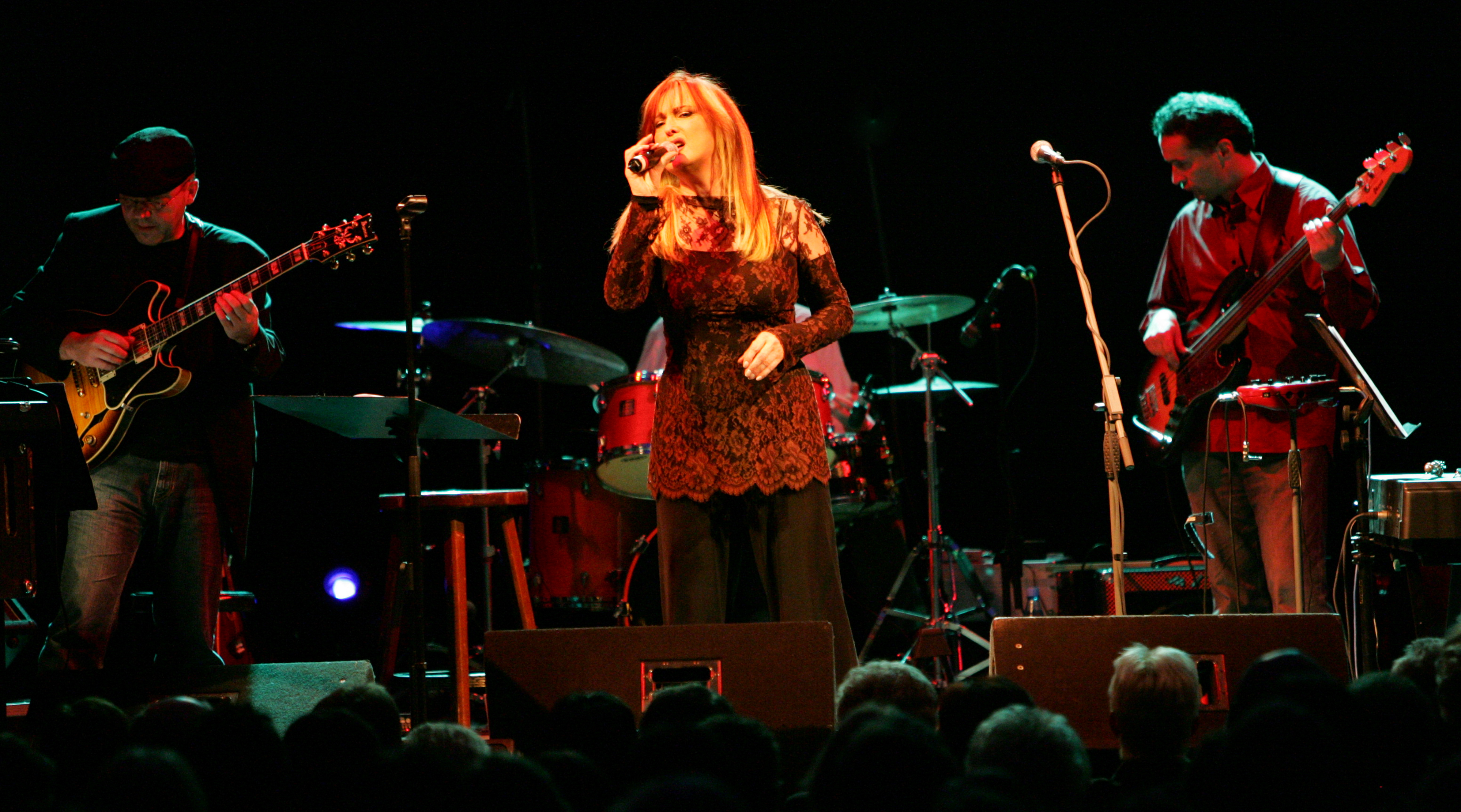
Veronika Fischer at the concert at Sparkasse Eberswalde, 2006

In 1981, Veronika Fischer left East Germany and moved to West Berlin after her house composer Franz Bartzsch and her then Hungarian husband Lászlo Kleber had also left the country. In the same year, the long-playing record amazed the audience at WEA. Further albums followed, but in West Germany Veronika Fischer could not build on the success she had enjoyed in the east. In 1983, she took part in the West German public selection of the national entry for the Eurovision Song Contest. Her title Infinitely far reached the eleventh and therefore penultimate place. More popular with critics than in the sales charts were subsequent titles such as In the evening before the storm, A feeling like life and You want your fun.

Shortly after the opening of the wall, Fischer was already appearing as a guest on East German television, and she has been giving concerts in former East Germany since 1990.

On her album What's there, she released "Sohn meiner Nachbarin" ("Son of my neighbour"), an adaptation of Dusty Springfield's 1968 "Son of a Preacher Man" in 1993. With Dreamer like us, the version of a song by Renft-Texter Gerulf Pannach, she was seen in 1995 in the ZDF-Hitparade. She sang the children's music The Child and the Cat and released other albums, including one with children's songs and a Christmas CD. For some time, she has been working with the Berlin text author and writer Gisela Steineckert. This collaboration resulted in new songs and a biography of Veronika Fischer. In the autumn of 2008, she released her 20th album, Unterwegs zu mir.

In 2013-2015, Fischer's application under the VwRehaG to participate in the sales of her four long-playing records published in East Germany was rejected.

== Awards ==
- 1975: "First prize national" at the Internationales Schlagerfestival Dresden for Daß ich eine Schneeflocke wär
- 1976: "Amber Nightingale" at the Sopot International Song Festival for Ich rufe dich
- 1979: Art Prize of the German Democratic Republic

== Discography ==
=== Studio and live albums ===
- 1975: Veronika Fischer & Band (Amiga)
- 1976: Veronika Fischer & Band (Amiga)
- 1978: Aufstehn (Veronika Fischer & Band; Amiga)
- 1980: Goldene Brücken (Veronika Fischer & Band; Amiga and Pool-Teldec)
- 1981: Staunen (WEA)
- 1983: Unendlich weit (WEA)
- 1984: Sehnsucht nach Wärme (WEA, 1990 also at Convoy/Karussell)
- 1987: Spiegelbilder (WEA)
- 1989: Veronika Fischer (WEA)
- 1993: Was ist dabei (Polydor)
- 1995: Träumer (Polydor)
- 1997: Mehr in Sicht (Polydor)
- 1997: Das Kind & der Kater (Kindermusical) (Polydor)
- 1999: Meine schönsten Kinderlieder (Universal)
- 2001: Tief im Sommer (Buschfunk)
- 2002: Live in Berlin – Jubilee concert on 28 July 2001 with Gästen (Buschfunk)
- 2004: Dünnes Eis (SPV)
- 2007: Weihnachten wieder daheim (Buschfunk)
- 2008: Unterwegs zu mir (DA)
- 2011: Zeitreise (Koch Universal)

=== Best-of albums and compilations of Fischer titles ===
- 1990: Die frühen Jahre (Musicando)
- 1991: Gefühle (WEA)
- 1992: Rock aus Deutschland Ost vol.13 Veronika Fischer (DSB)
- 1996: Meine Lieder (Ariola)
- 1996: In Liebe – Meine schönsten Balladen (Hansa/Amiga)
- 2001: Meisterstücke (Polydor)
- 2001: Die großen Hits 1971–2001 (Sony/Amiga)
- 2006: Das Beste von Veronika Fischer (Doppel-CD)
- 2006: Veronika Fischer 35 (CD-Box-Set)
- 2011: Balladen (DA)

=== Singles ===
- 1974: Und wer bist du / Blues von der letzten Gelegenheit (Amiga)
- 1975: In jener Nacht / Abendlied (Amiga)
- 1975: Klavier im Fluß / Als ich noch ein Kind war (Amiga)
- 1975: Auf der Wiese / Zu groß der Hut (Amiga)
- 1976: Nein, Doktor, nein / Ich rufe dich (Amiga)
- 1977: Sommernachtsball / Hans im Glück (Amiga)
- 1977: ... und du siehst fort / Zigarettenblues (Amiga)
- 1978: Sommer unter Freunden / Meiner Schuhe Ausgang (Amiga)
- 1979: Zeit für ein Kind / Der Vagabund (Amiga)
- 1979: Weihnachten wieder daheim / Hast du einen Freund (Pool-Teldec)
- 1981: Halt mich fest / Er weint nur, wenn's keiner sieht (WEA)
- 1982: Und doch bleibt ein Zaun ein Zaun / Staunen (WEA)
- 1983: Am Abend vor dem Sturm / Partner (WEA)
- 1983: Unendlich weit / Wir beide gegen den Wind (WEA)
- 1984: Du willst deinen Spaß / Blumenverkäuferin (WEA)
- 1985: Sehnsucht nach Wärme / Unter die Haut (WEA)
- 1987: Ein Wort zuviel / Walzer (WEA)
- 1988: Ein Gefühl wie das Leben / Wart' auf den Zauberer (WEA)
- 1989: Hey du / Du kannst bleiben (WEA)
- 1989: Ich verzeih' dir / Nummer 1 (WEA)
- 1991: Nicht zu retten (with Edo Zanki) / Wie geht's weiter (WEA)
- 1991: Sehnsucht nach dir / Wo sind die schönen Spiele hin (WEA)
- 1993: Sehnsucht / Regentropfen (Polydor)
- 1993: Der Sohn meiner Nachbarin / Trenchcoatmann (Polydor)
- 1993: Was ist dabei / Es war ein Land (Polydor)
- 1994: Ich hab' geträumt / Niemals mehr / Mauern geh'n (Polydor)
- 1995: Träumer wie wir / Illusionen (Polydor)
- 1995: Verlorenes Herz / Sag dem Wind ... / Weit über's Meer (Polydor)
- 1996: Abflug in die Stadt / Sag dem Wind ... / Ich warte / Titelmelodie aus ‚Die Tote von Amelung' (Polydor)
- 1996: Auf der Wiese (Neuaufnahme) / Zeit der Züge (Polydor)
- 1997: Sonnenschein im Haar / In deiner Hand (Polydor)
- 1997: Viel zu nah / Daß ich eine Schneeflocke wär (Neuaufnahme) (Polydor)
- 1998: Ich muß dich seh'n / Zigaretten hol'n / Prinzen (Polydor)

=== Collaborations ===
- 1978: Reinhard Lakomy's Geschichtenlieder (Amiga)
- 1980: Der Traumzauberbaum (Amiga)
- 2001: Der Traumzauberbaum 2 – Agga Knack, die wilde Traumlaus (Ravensburger)
