= Ingelheim Imperial Palace =

German palace

Coordinates: 49°58′39″N 8°04′19″E

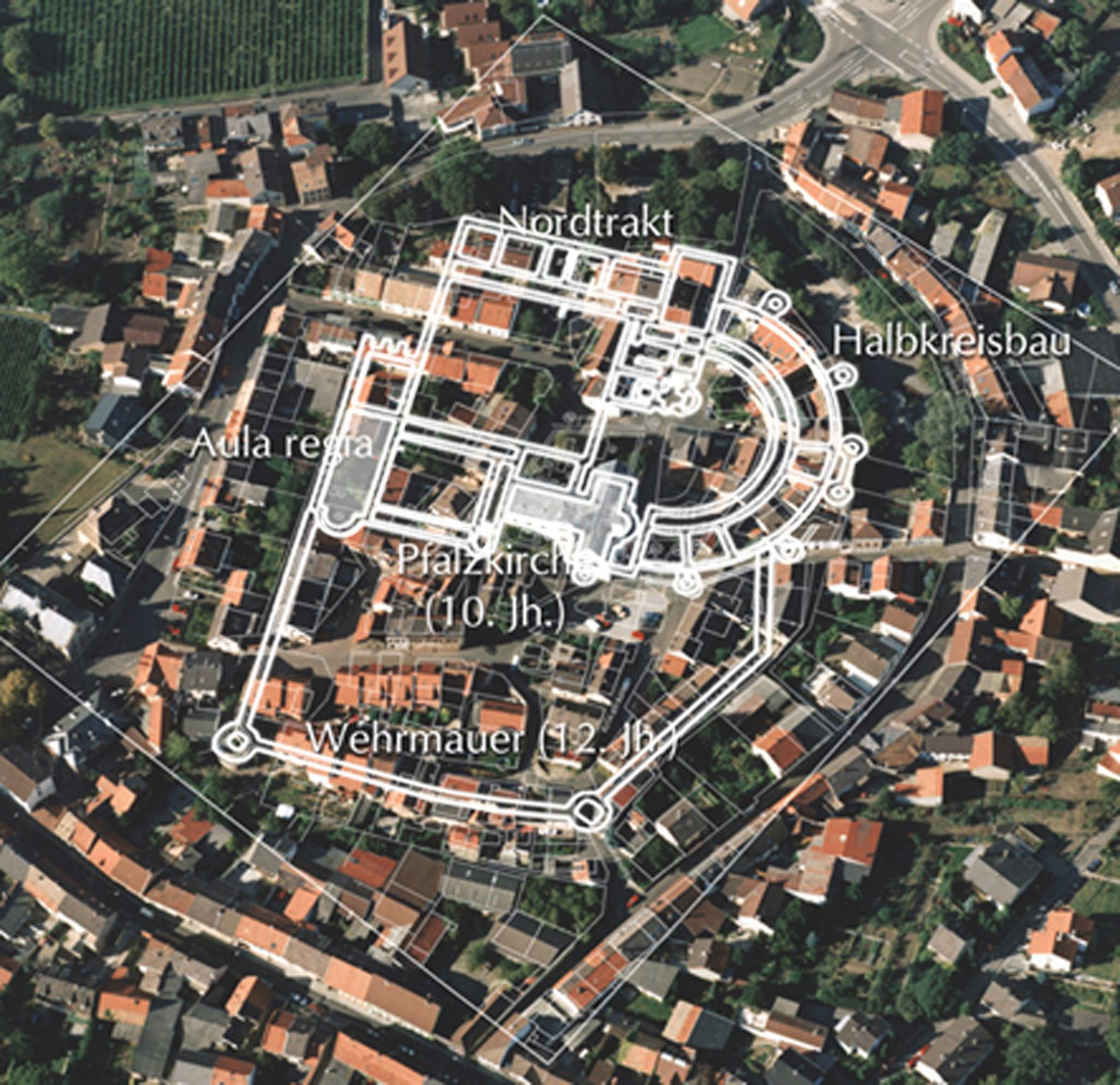
Today's cityscape with former walls marked

The Ingelheim Imperial Palace (German: Ingelheimer Kaiserpfalz) was an important imperial palace erected in the second half of the 8th century in Germany. It served kings of Francia and later Holy Roman Emperors and Kings as a residenz and place for governance until the 11th century.

The former palace complex is located in the cadastral area of Nieder-Ingelheim, 15 km west of Mainz, in district "Im Saal". It is located at a slope with a view of the Rhine plains. Impressive remains of the buildings of the palace have been preserved above ground to this day. The greater part of the complex is located foundation under ground and archaeological excavations have been able to reconstruct the entire system of buildings.

== History ==
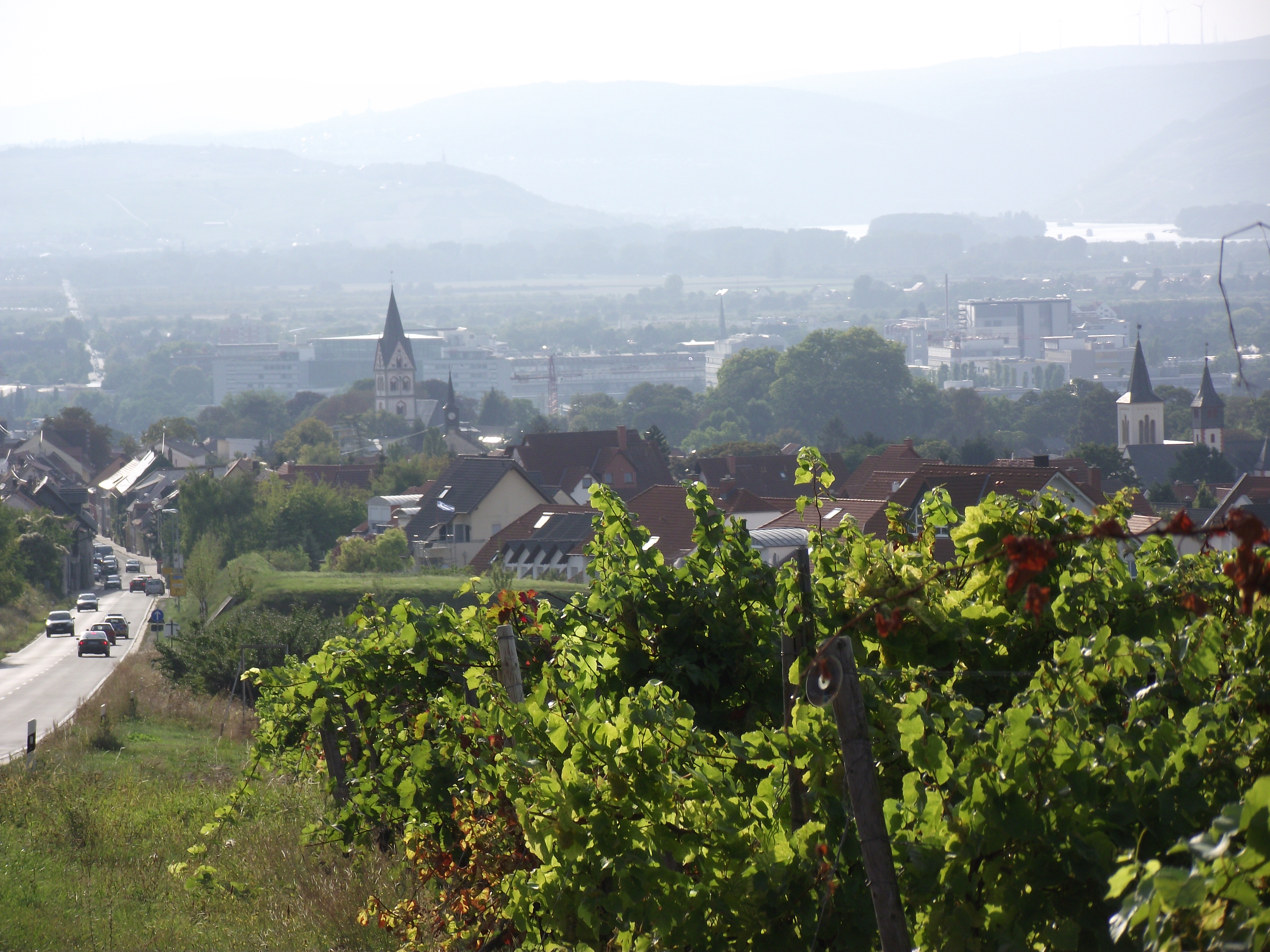
Nieder-Ingelheim, on the left is the town's St Remigius Church, whose previous buildings date back to the 6th or 7th century, and on the right is the chapel of the imperial palace. In the background you can see the Rhine and on the other bank the Rheingau.

The presence of the builder of the Kaiserpfalz, Charlemagne, in Ingelheim is first documented in September 774. Since the end of 787 he stayed in Ingelheim again, but this time for much longer. He spent Christmas here and stayed over the winter without interruption until the middle of 788. This was also the time of the great imperial assembly (Hoftag) of June 788, at which Tassilo III, Duke of Bavaria, was sentenced to death for high treason (he was ultimately pardoned to monastic imprisonment by Charlemagne).

In his Vita Karoli Magni Einhard counts the palace of Ingelheim, alongside that of Nijmegen, among Charlemagne's most important building achievements, just behind the Palatine Chapel, Aachen, and the Mainz-Kastel Rhine Bridge. In August 807, Charlemagne gathered his court again in Ingelheim for a Hoftag, but the Palace of Aachen had now become his “favorite palace” because the hot springs there relieved his rheumatism. Ingelheim was visited much more often by his son, Louis the Pious, and there is evidence of it ten times between 817 and 840. Under him, the Ingelheim Pfalz was used for five imperial assemblies and four high-ranking embassy receptions as well as at least one church synod. In the summer of 826, two important imperial diets took place in Ingelheim. On June 20, 840, Louis the Pious died on an island in the Rhine off Ingelheim. However, his body was not buried in Ingelheim, but was transferred to the family grave in the Abbey of Saint-Arnould in Metz.

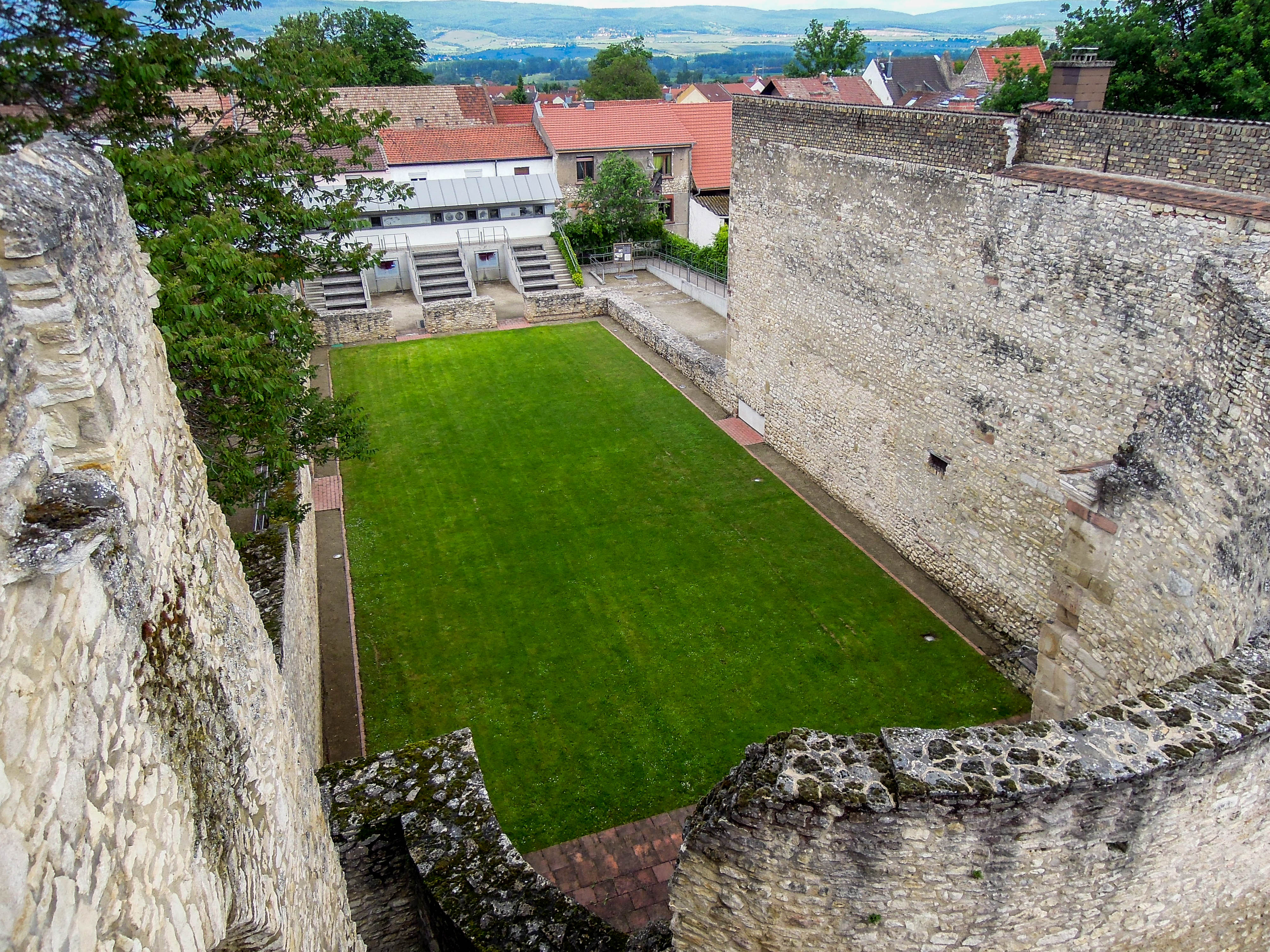
Aula Regia of the Imperial Palace in Ingelheim

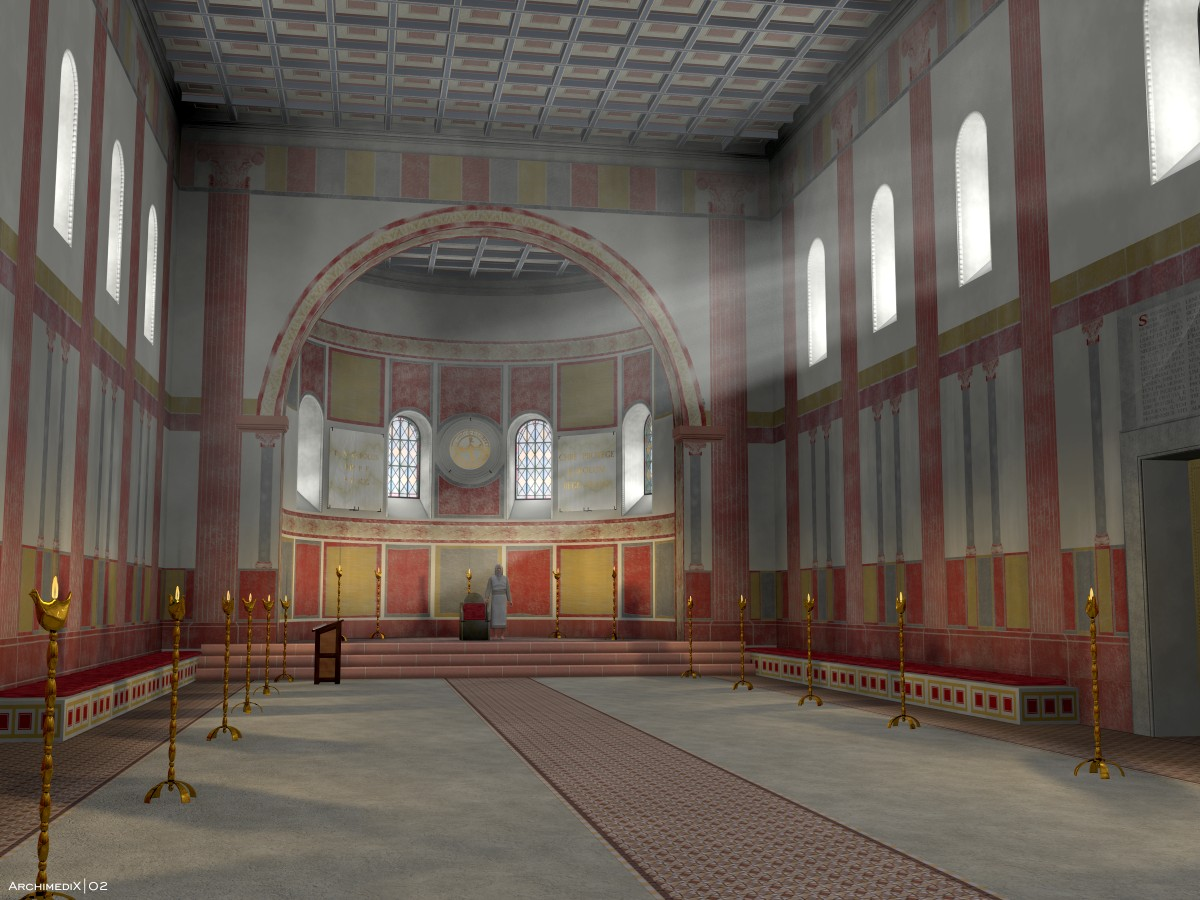
Digital reconstruction of the aula regia of Ingelheim Imperial Palace (around 790)

The late Carolingians can only be found seven times in the Ingelheim Imperial Palace. Under Ottonian rule, Ingelheim was again preferred. Otto the Great, for example, can be found at least ten times in Ingelheim - as often as in Aachen. In June 948 there was an important synod in Ingelheim that was intended to resolve the schism in the archiepiscopal see of Reims. Further imperial synods took place in 958, 972, 980, 993 and 996. The short reign of Otto II included two Easter festivals (977 and 980) and an imperial synod (980), which were held in Ingelheim. Otto III is most commonly found in Ingelheim.

Like other rural palaces, it had already lost its importance for major political, religious and social events in the 11th century, after Henry III had celebrated his wedding feast for his marriage to Agnes of Poitou here in 1043. After that, there was hardly any written information about the Imperial Palace for a long time. Frederick I Barbarossa, the second Hohenstaufen emperor, may have been in Ingelheim once, namely at a meeting with Hildegard of Bingen, if the reference to this in an alleged letter from the emperor to her is genuine, perhaps in 1154 or 1163. In the source “Gesta Frederici” by Rahewin it is said that Barbarossa expanded the palace and “restored it in the most appropriate manner”. However, the only thing that is certain is that the palace was fortified during the Hohenstaufen era. After its restoration and fortification, the palace served mainly for territorial security and was probably inhabited by Burgmannen. Charles IV became the last ruler to stay here in 1354.

The Aula regia was a single-nave apsidal hall measuring 40.5 m × 16.5 m and with side portals on the east and west sides. Unlike the royal halls of the Aachen and Paderborn Palaces, the Ingelheim Aula Regia was not only accessible via the transverse axis - as in the traditional Franconian house - but also - following the ancient model - via a main entrance in the longitudinal axis. The semicircular building had a diameter of 89 m, was at least two floors high and had six round towers on the outside, some of which contained complex water-conducting facilities. The semicircular building, which dates back to the Carolingian period, was fortified with the “Heidesheimer Tor” (Heidesheim Gate). The remains of the interior include 3,000 fragments of wall plaster painted in different colors as well as floor tiles made of marble and porphyry, some of which can be viewed in the visitor center and the Museum at the Imperial Palace.

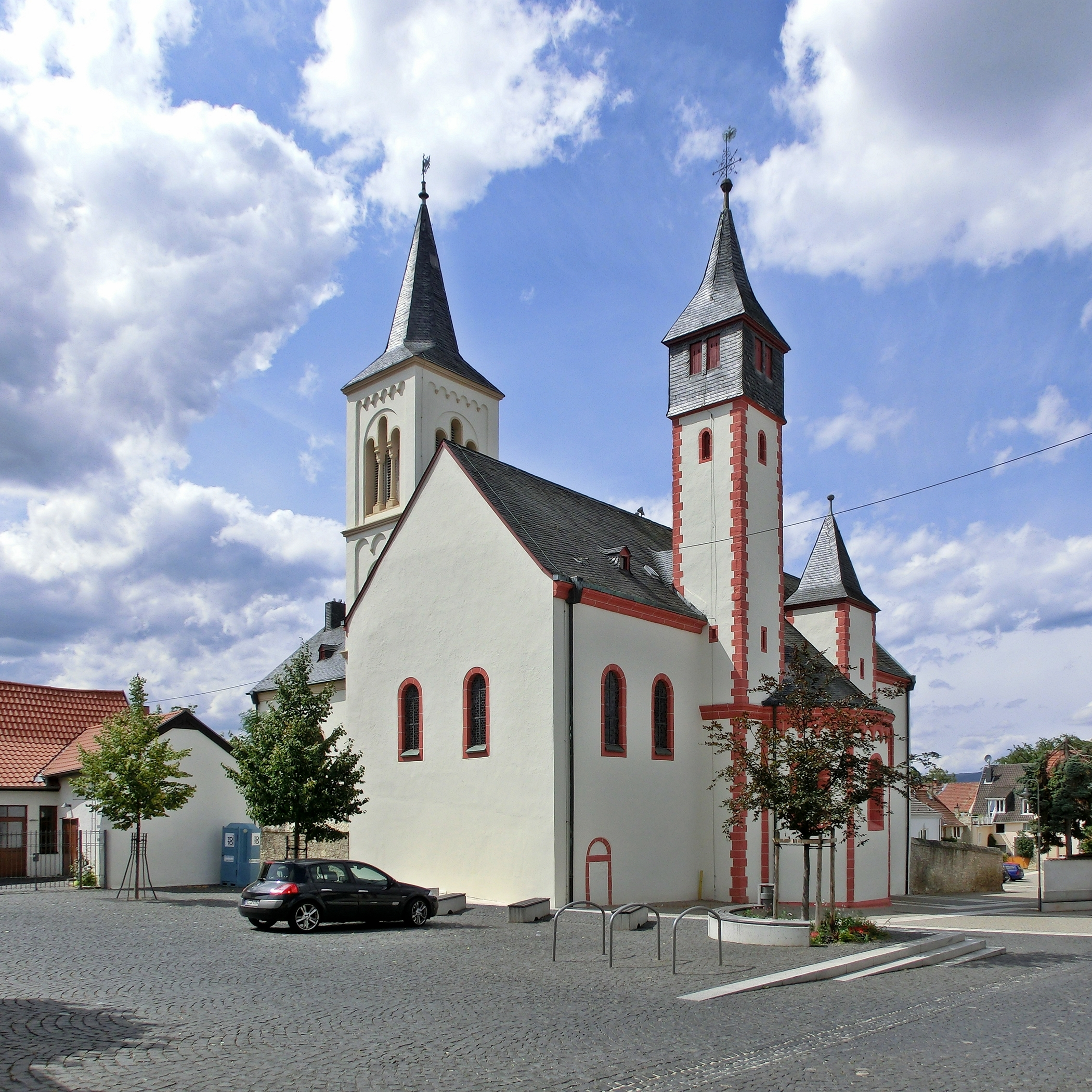
The (third) palace chapel (Saalkirche)

A small palace chapel with three apses, a so-called trikonchos, was initially located in the inner courtyard to the left in front of the semicircular building. Probably shortly before 900, this chapel was replaced in the same place by a slightly larger apse hall. In the 10th century, the hall church was built south of the apse hall, to the right in front of the semicircular building as a new palace church, which was renovated in the 12th century in the Romanesque style and is the only building in the complex that is still in use today. Due to the occupation of French troops during the French Revolution, the church was in a ruinous state and had collapsed except for the choir and the transept walls. Renovation began in 1803. In 1861 the larger bell tower was built in the neo-Romanesque style. The nave was only rebuilt in 1965 and reconstructed according to historical dimensions.

== History of study ==
The first investigations of the palace area took place in middle of the 19th century. These first, small excavations were reported by Karl August von Cohausen in August 1852. Paul Clemen undertook further excavations in 1888/9. The German Association for Art Research began systematic studies under the direction of Christian Rauch in 1909, which had to brought to a halt following the outbreak of the First World War. However, Rauch published preliminary reports on the excavations. This formed the basis of a model of the palace as a typical Carolingian palace, which was developed in 1931/32 and endured until 1975. In 1960, new excavations were undertaken by the Deutsche Forschungsgemeinschaft under the direction of Walter Sage. In 1963, Hermann Ament led new excavations, followed by further excavations in 1965 and 1968/70 under Uta Wengenroth-Weimann. Based on the overall plan of excavation and reconstructions by Walter Sage, Konrad Weidemann produced a new model of the Ingelheim Imperial Palace in 1975. Since 1995 further excavations have been ongoing in the area of the palace. These studies aim at a new record, description, and dating of the individual parts of the structure and of the overall topography. They have already led to quite a few discoveries. For example, a gold coin and belt tongue from the time of Charlemagne have been recovered, as well as the high medieval heating system. In addition, the latest excavation results have been used to create a new model of Ingelheim palace.
