= Aula regia =

Term in medieval architecture

Coordinates: 41.8891°N 12.4870°E

An aula regia (lat. for "royal hall"), also referred to as a palas hall, is a name given to the great hall in an imperial (or governor's) palace in the Ancient Roman architecture and in the derived medieval audience halls of emperors, kings or bishops as part of their palaces (for example the German Kaiserpfalz – Imperial palace). In the Middle Ages the term was also used as a synonym for the Pfalz (palace) itself.

Architecturally, the medieval aulas followed the model of the ancient Roman audience halls in the imperial and governor's palaces such as the Aula regia in the Flavian Palace on the Palatine Hill in Rome, completed in 92 AD or the Aula Palatina in Trier, Germany, completed in 311 under Constantine the Great. This emperors's mother Helena lived in Rome in the Sessorium Palace; She had its smaller, hall-shaped aula converted into the church of Santa Croce in Gerusalemme for the relics she had brought with her from Jerusalem, while of the palace's larger civil basilica, built in the style of a three-aisled columned basilica, only the apse remains as a free-standing ruin.

The aulas usually followed the single-nave building type, not that of the Basilica with a higher central nave flanked by two or more lower longitudinal aisles which was more commonly used for market halls in the Roman era. Both ancient types of halls became models for Christian church architecture. The monumental aulae regiae served as venues for court ceremonies at audiences and receptions, and in the Middle Ages also for Hoftage, the irregular gatherings of the powerful of the Holy Roman Empire, as well as for coronation meals, wedding feasts or other banquets. The ruler's throne can be assumed to be in the apse (which became the chancel in churches); the entrance is opposite the throne. The Carolingian hall buildings, unlike the ancient ones, were usually not accessed across the longitudinal axis despite the apses that had been adopted, but - as in the traditional Franconian and Middle German house - via the transverse axis, on the long side of the building, like the aulae of the Palace of Aachen or the Palace of Goslar.

An example of a surviving aula regia of the early middle ages is the church of Santa María del Naranco near Oviedo, built around 850 as an aula regia for Ramiro I. Most Imperial Palaces, royal palaces or bishop's palaces of the early and high Middle Ages contained such an audience hall, for example the aula regia in the Palace of Aachenː it later became a part of the medieval Town Hall of Aachen. The royal hall of the Imperial Palace Ingelheim (c. 780) has been digitally reconstructed.

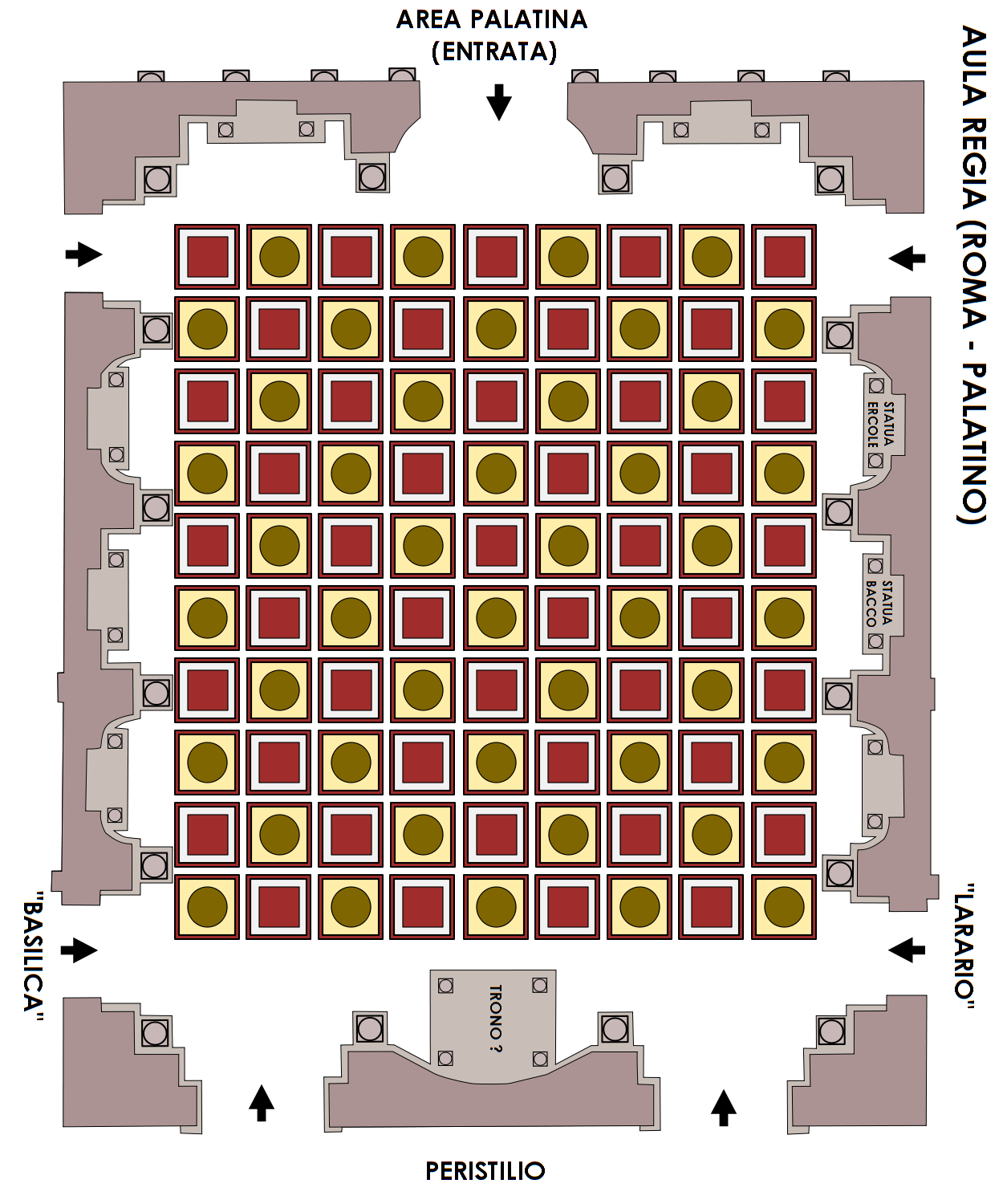
Floor plan of the Aula regia in the Flavian Palace (92 AD)

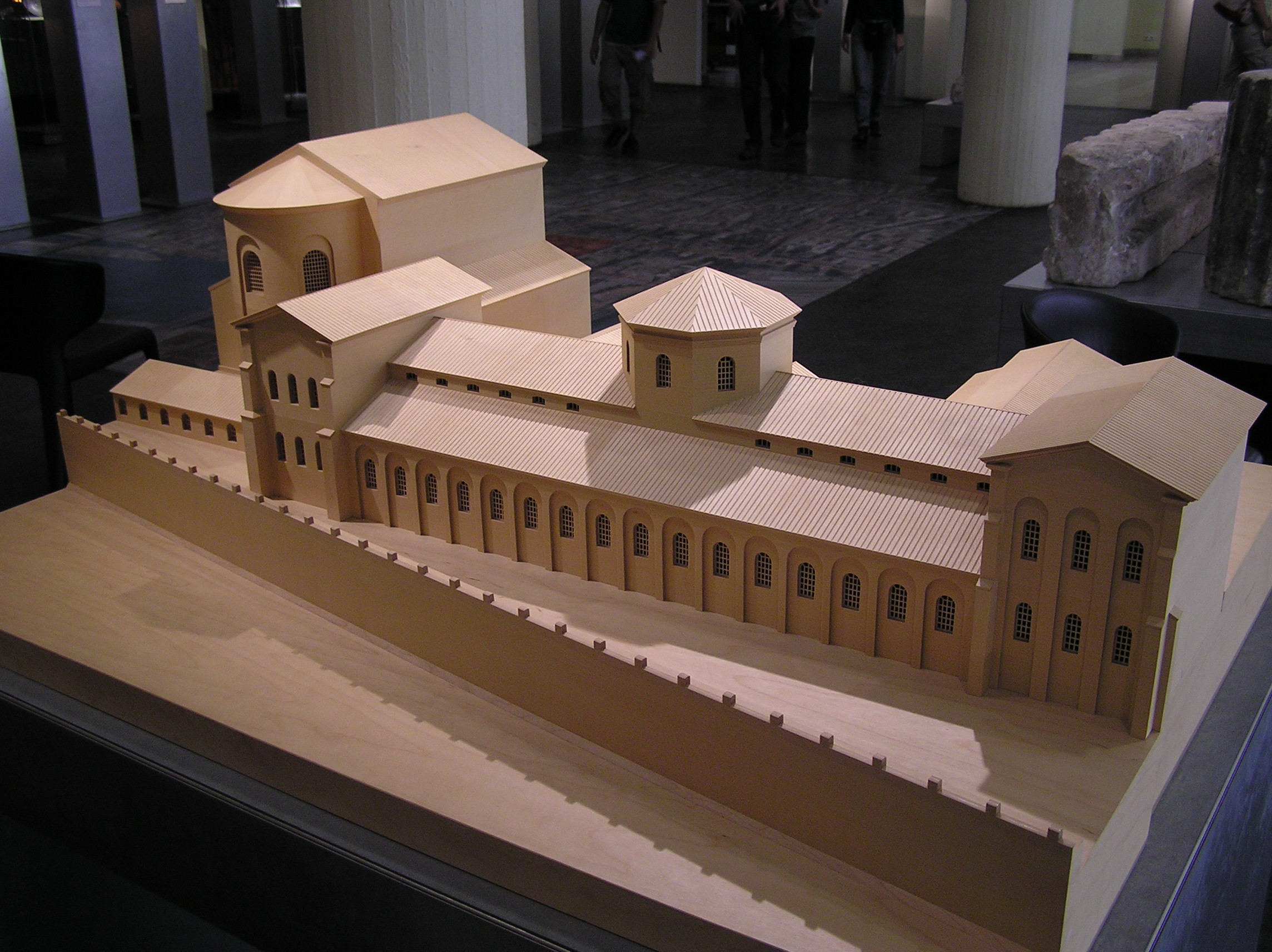
Model of the Praetorium of Cologne with the aula regia on the left (built in 185 AD)

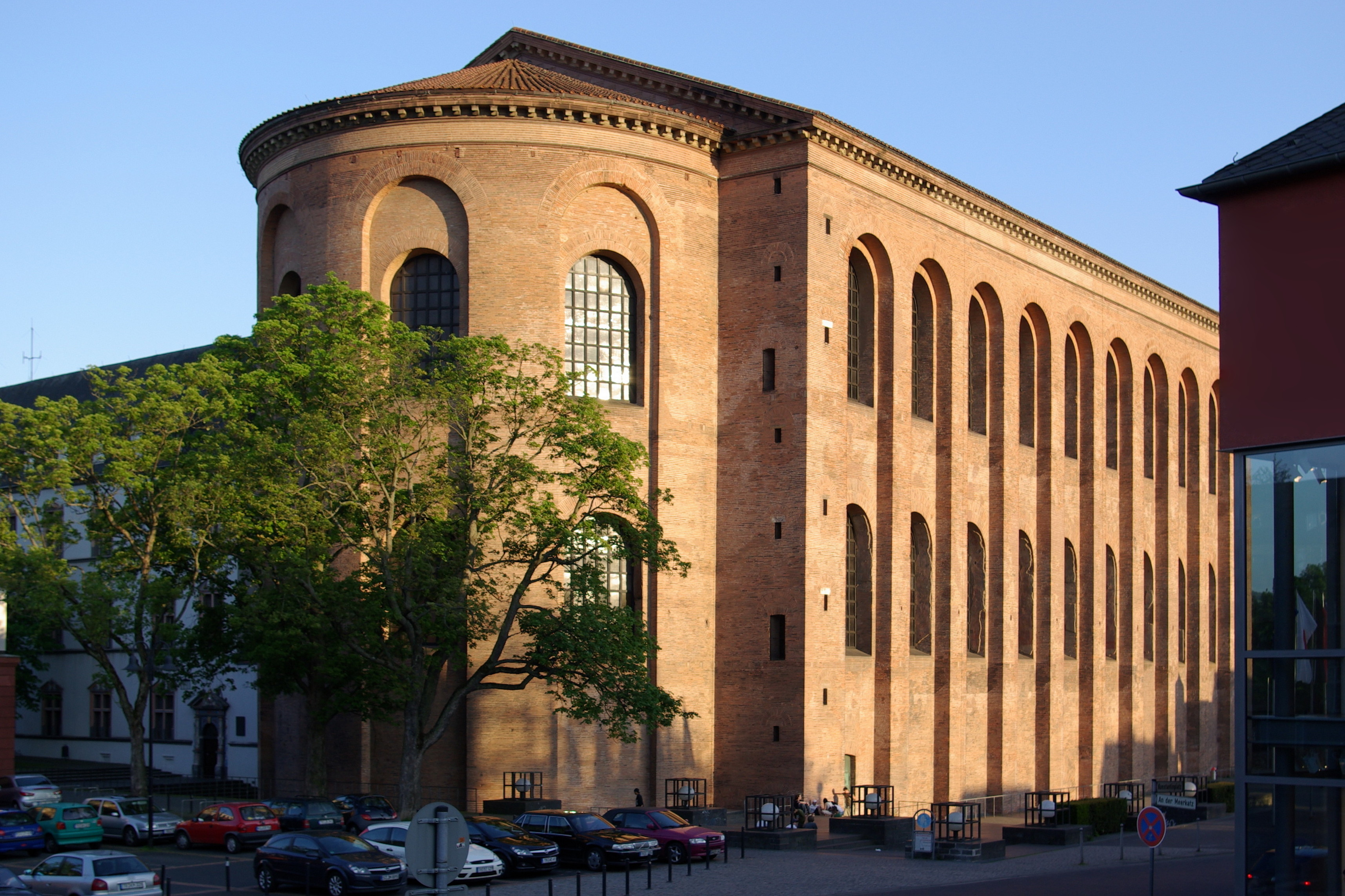
Aula Palatina in Trier, Germany (305–311)

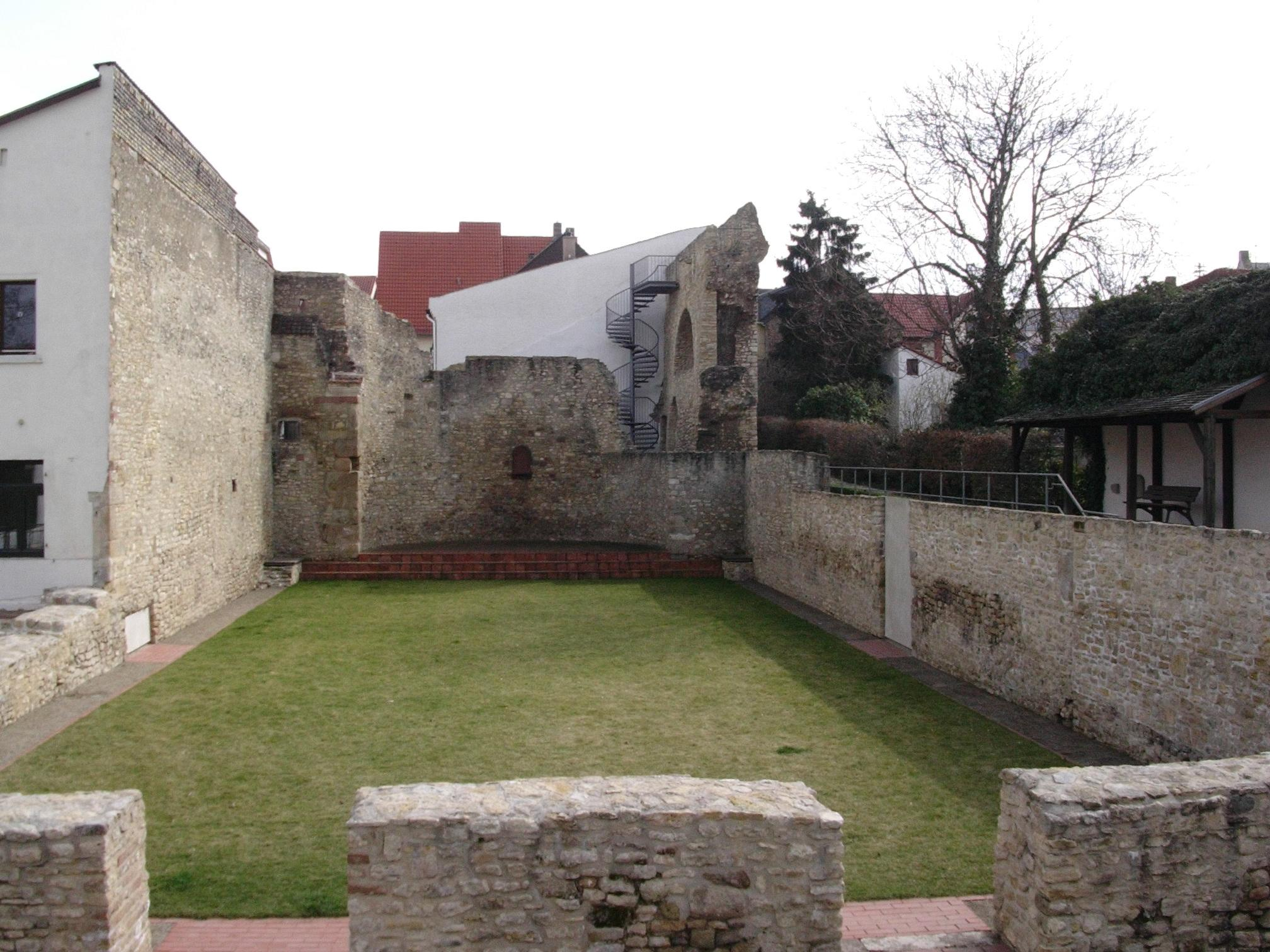
Remains of the aula regia in the Ingelheim Imperial Palace (c. 780)

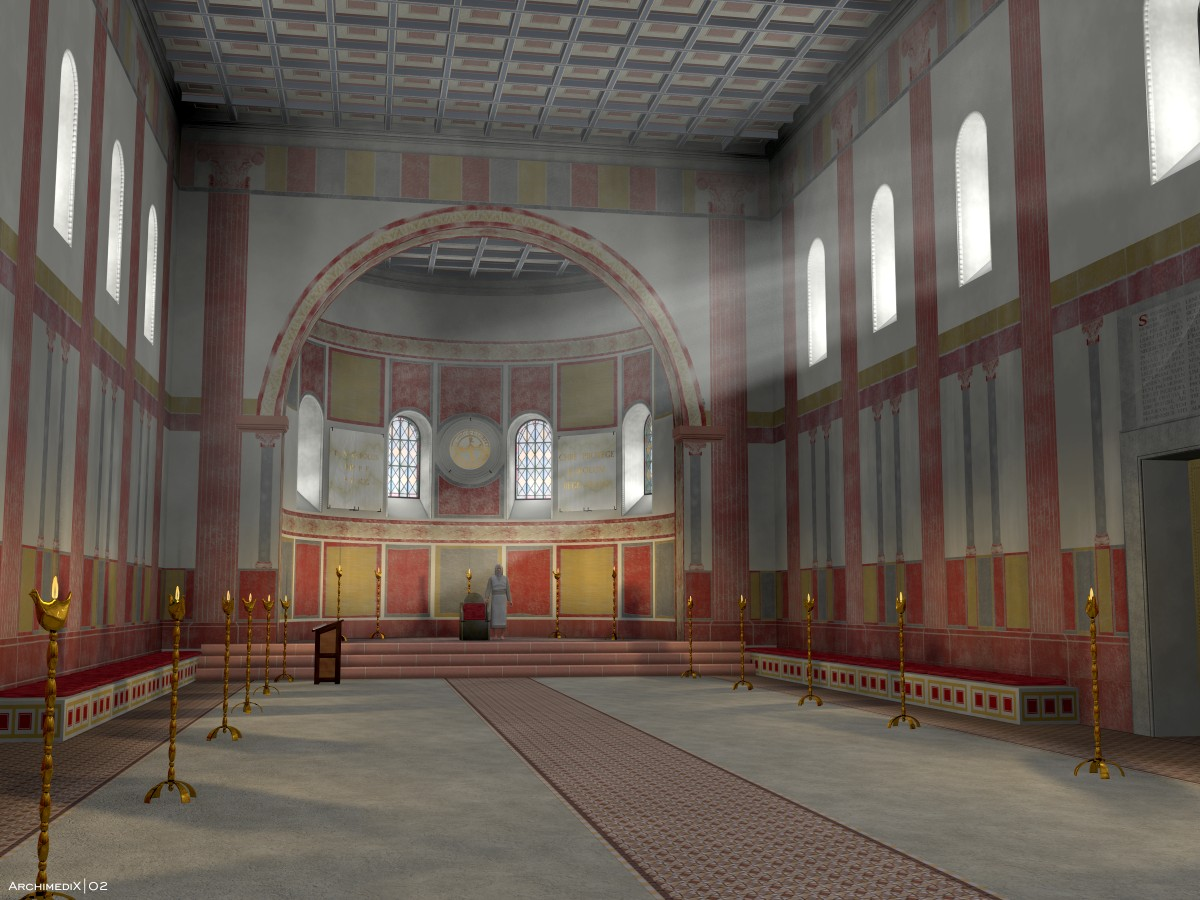
Digital artist's impression of the aula regia of the Ingelheim Palace (computer graphic)

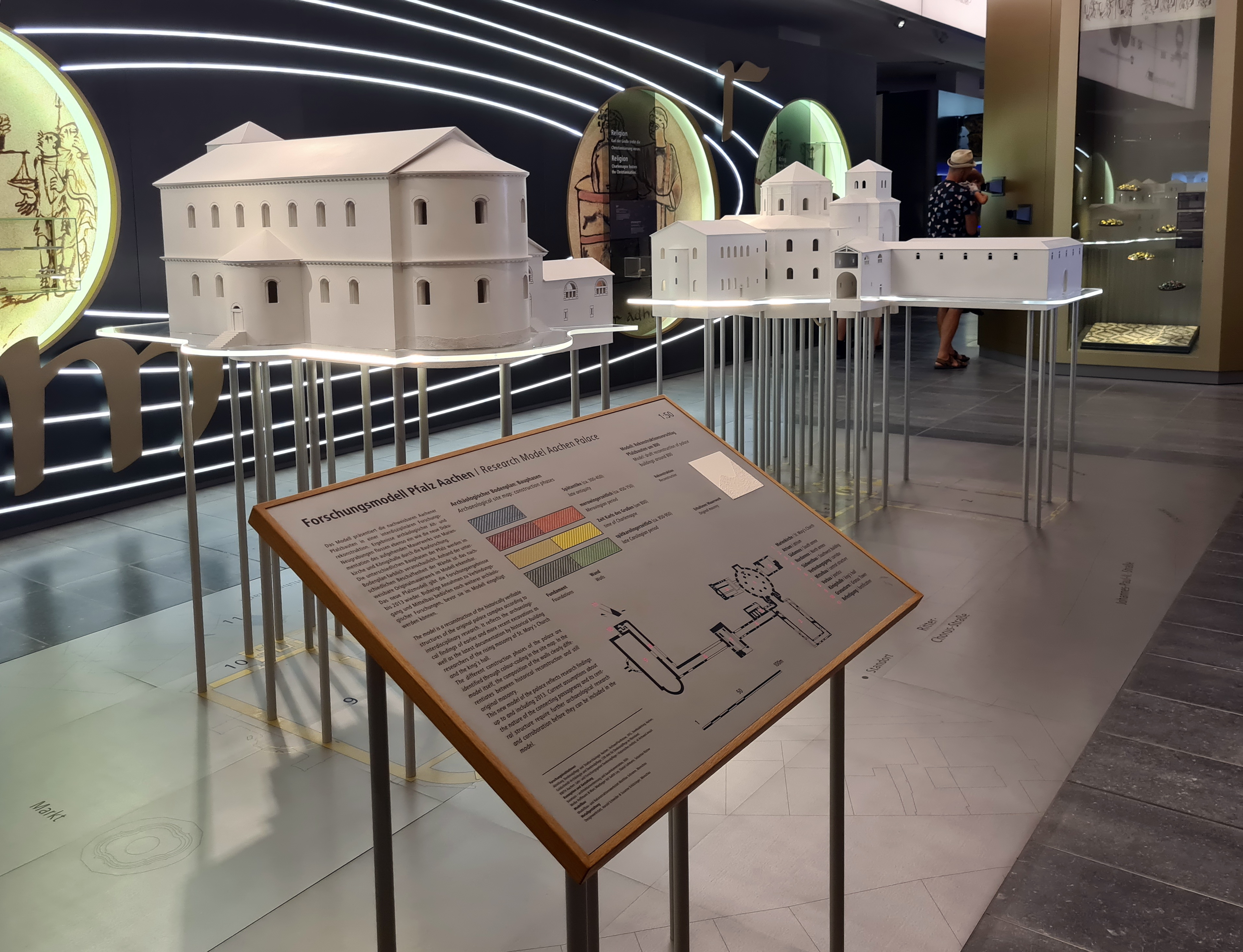
Model of the aula regia at the Palace of Aachen (c. 800)

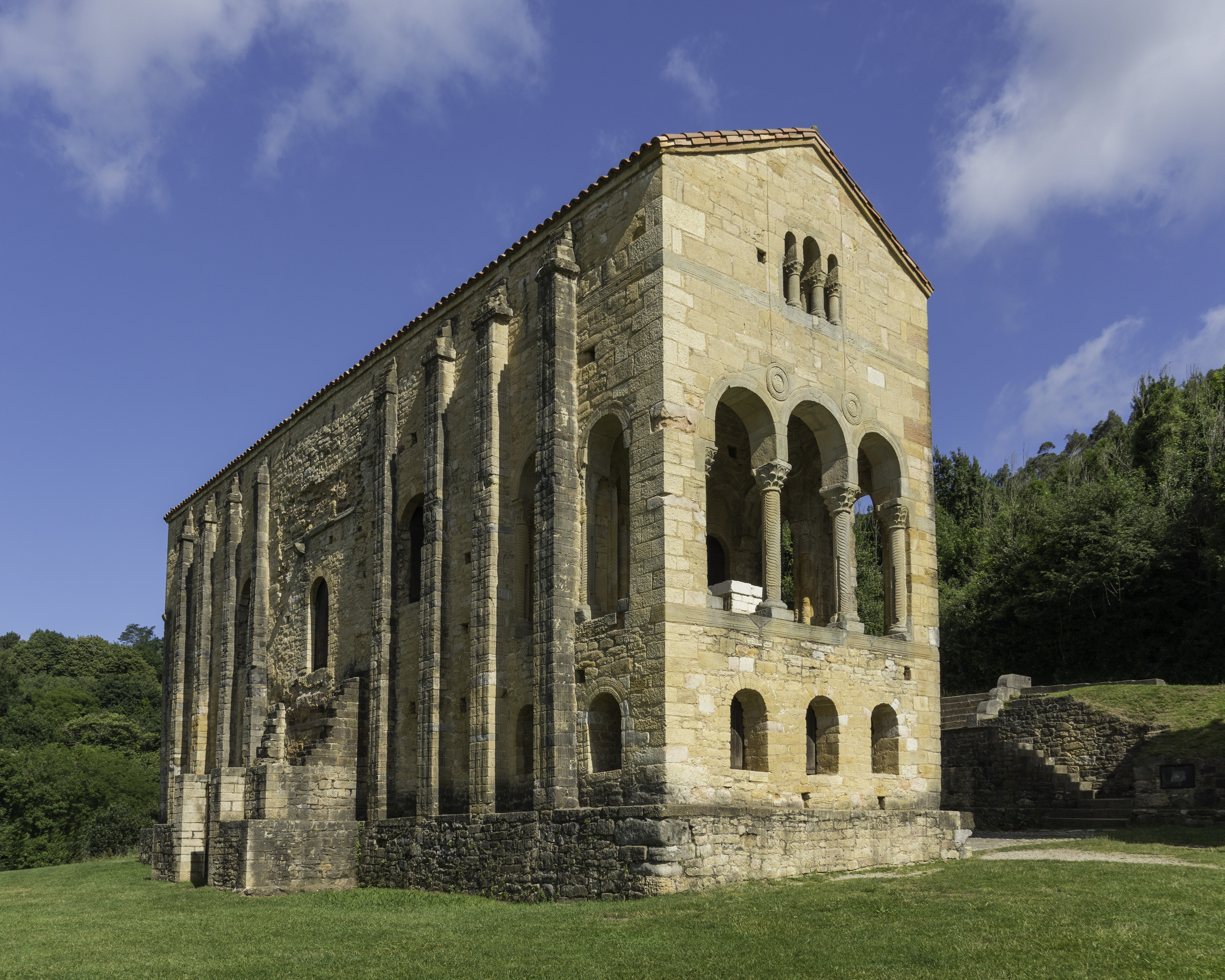
Santa Maria del Naranco (850)

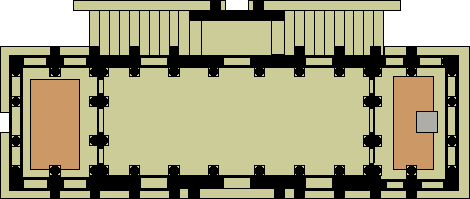
Floor plan of Santa Maria del Naranco
