= Wölfis =

- Ortsteil of Ohrdruf
- Coat of arms
- Interactive map of Wölfis
- Location within Germany Location within Thuringia
- Coordinates: 50°48′33″N 10°46′46″E
- Country: Germany
- State: Thuringia
- District: Gotha
- Town: Ohrdruf

Area
  - Total: 29.22 km^{2} (11.28 sq mi)
- Elevation: 405 m (1,329 ft)

Population (2017-12-31)
  - Total: 1,454
  - Density: 49.76/km^{2} (128.9/sq mi)
- Time zone: UTC+01:00 (CET)
  - Summer (DST): UTC+02:00 (CEST)
- Postal codes: 99885
- Dialling codes: 03624
- Vehicle registration: GTH
- Website: www.ohrdruf.de/woelfis.htm

Wölfis (German pronunciation: [ˈvœlfɪs]) is a village and a former municipality in the district of Gotha, Thuringia, Germany. Since 1 January 2019, it is part of the town Ohrdruf.

== Geography ==
The village lies in the valley of the stream Schill (formerly Reed Bach) that joins at the northwestern edge of the village with the stream Hopbach (formerly Rotenbach) and forms the border with a military training area in the north. From there, it flows to north of Ohrdruf to the river Ohra. The biggest part of its territory is occupied by the military training area, immediately adjacent to the northern outskirts of the village. In the south of the village lies the northern edge of the Thuringian Forest. The road L 2148 passes through the community, northwest to Ohrdruf, and south to Crawinkel.

== History ==
At the beginning of the 9th Century, the location is mentioned as Wolfduze in a directory of the Patrimony of Lullus, Archbishop of Mainz. On 20 January 1735 a fire left over 199 buildings in ruins, including the church parsonage, and both school buildings. Church records were destroyed by fire, creating a scarcity of information on the early history of the village. Using donations, a new church was built, and consecrated on 16 October 1736. By 1780, the village had largely recovered and counted 294 homes, and had 1100 inhabitants.

=== Population ===
- 1780 - 1100
- 1841 - 1320
- 1860 - 1441
- 1946 - 3000
- 1994 - 1833
- 1995 - 1843
- 1996 - 1832
- 1997 - 1824
- 1998 - 1812
- 1999 - 1792
- 2000 - 1752
- 2001 - 1732
- 2002 - 1710
- 2003 - 1686
- 2004 - 1667
- 2005 - 1655
- 2006 - 1618
- 2007 - 1595
- 2008 - 1569
- 2009 - 1549
- 2010 - 1521
- 2011 - 1473
- 2012 - 1456
- 2013 - 1472
- 2014 - 1454
- 2015 - 1452
- 2016 - 1455

Data Source: Thuringian State Office for Statistics

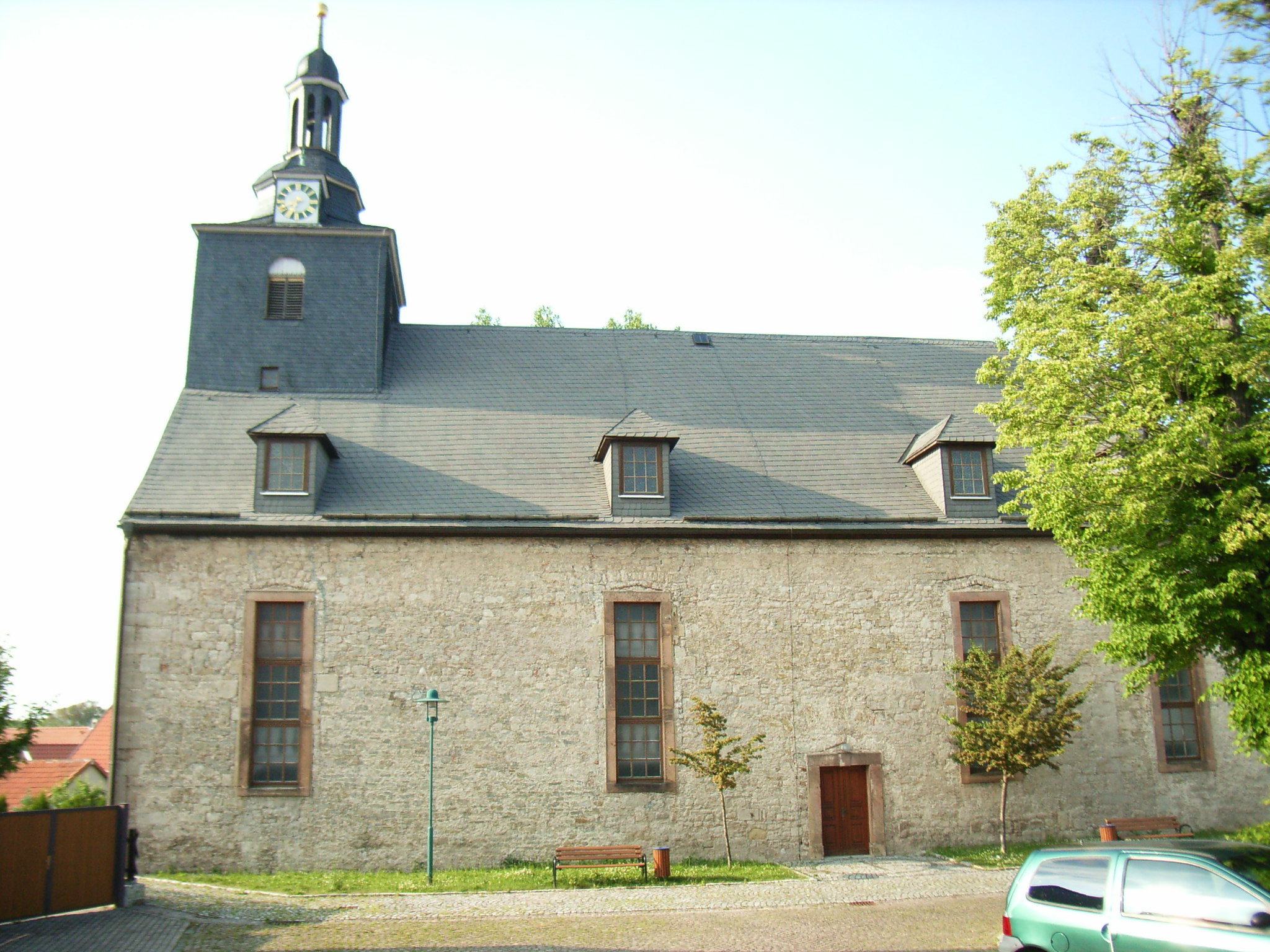
Village Church

== Culture ==
There has been a tradition of brass music in the village since 1878. Today, there are two town orchestras, the Children and Youth Concert Band (Kinder und Jugendblasorchester), as well as Concert Wölfis (Blasorchester Wölfis). Both orchestras have 40 members, and are actively appearing at events in Thuringia and other states.

== Notable people ==
- Wolfgang Heider (1558–1626), professor of ethics and politics (1587) and university librarian (1617–1620) at the University of Jena
- Hermann Kirchner (1861–1929), musician, composer of the folk song Der Holderstrauch
- Alexander Freiherr von Wangenheim (1872–1959), Politician (NSDAP)
- Veronika Fischer (b 1951), singer
- Johann Leon (1530 in Ohrdruf - ca. 1597 in Wölfis), Lutheran pastor and hymn writer
- Peter Makolies (b. 1936 in Königsberg), German sculptor, grew up in Wölfis
