= Heßloch =

Hessloch or Heßloch may refer to:

- Dittelsheim-Heßloch, Rhineland-Palatinate, Germany
- Wiesbaden-Heßloch, Hessen, Germany

== See also ==
- Haßloch, a municipality in the Bad Dürkheim district in Rhineland-Palatinate, Germany
