= Gondulphus of Metz =

Frankish bishop and saint

Saint Gondulphus, Gundulfus, Gondulf, or Gondon (died 6 September 823) was the Bishop of Metz from 816 until his death.

As bishop, Gondulphus succeeded Angilram, who caused Paul the Deacon to write the Liber de episcopis Mettensibus, and who probably died in 791. At the death of Angilram there was a vacancy in the episcopal See of Metz, which was terminated by the accession of Gondulphus. The Annales S. Vincentii Mettenses give the date as 819. But, as it is known, on the other hand, that since the time of Bishop Chrodegang episcopal ordination took place on Sunday, the date of the consecration of Bishop Gondulphus must be set down as 28 (?) December, 816. The old episcopal catalogue of the church of Metz informs us that Gondulphus occupied the see of this church for six years, eight months, and seven days, and that he died on the 7th of the Ides of September, which would be the sixth of that month, in the year 823. He was buried in the monastery of Gorze, where his relics are still honoured on 6 September. It is impossible to quote in this respect any special patronage, and with regard to his episcopal career, apart from the details furnished here, there exists no information.

His feast is celebrated on 6 September.

== Attribution ==
- The original version of this article included text from The Catholic Encyclopedia, Volume VI, Published 1909, New York, Robert Appleton Company, as transcribed at .
