= Wilchar =

Wilchar (Note: Also Wilichar or Wilcharius (French: Wilchaire), from Latin Uuilarius, Uuiliarius or Vulcarius.) (died 786/787) was the archbishop of the province of the Gauls, succeeding Chrodegang after 766 as the leading bishop in the kingdom of the Franks. Before receiving the pallium, he ruled a suburbicarian diocese in Rome. As archbishop, he held the diocese of Sens for a time (762/769–772/778) and afterwards held authority over all Gaul without a fixed see.

Over several decades, Wilchar played a diplomatic role between Francia and Rome. He helped Charlemagne become king of the whole kingdom after the death of his brother in 771. In the 780s, he dispatched a missionary bishop to the church in Spain, but the project failed.

== Bishop of Mentana ==
Wilchar's life and career are poorly documented. He was either a Frank or a Lombard, possibly from the vicinity of Rome. He was the bishop of Mentana from not earlier than November 751 and not later than 753 until the 760s, succeeding Benedict. Five letters in the Codex Carolinus refer to Wilchar as coepiscopus (co-bishop), the title in the eighth century of those bishops that would in the future be known as cardinals. He is the first recorded coepiscopus–cardinal with a Germanic name. The diocese of Mentana at the time straddled the boundary between the duchy of Rome and the duchy of Spoleto and contained a significant Lombard population.

Between 754 and 761, Wilchar travelled between Rome and Francia as a diplomat. He accompanied Pope Stephen II on his visit to Francia in 754. He remained at the court of Pippin III until 757 when Stephen requested his return. In 758, Pope Paul I sent him back to Pippin, who, in 761, sent him back to Paul bearing a royal letter. Not long after, Paul sent him back to Pippin, authorized to consecrate as bishop a Roman priest named Marinus who was resident at the Frankish court. Since a bishop could not normally be consecrated except by three bishops, Wilchar received a dispensation to perform the consecration by himself.

== Bishop of Sens ==
In Paul's letter authorizing Wilchar to consecrate Marinus, the bishop is not referred to as coepiscopus, indicating that he had already been translated to the diocese of Sens in Francia. This most likely took place in 762 or 763. In a list of Sens bishops, Wilchar comes after Lupus, who is known from other documents to have still been bishop in 762 but is not mentioned thereafter.

In the division of the kingdom of Pippin III between his sons, Charles I (Charlemagne) and Carloman I, Wilchar's diocese fell to Carloman. According to the Royal Frankish Annals, "he was Carloman's man". He may even have been a kinsman of Carloman's trusted counsellor Autchar, both of whom travelled frequently between Francia and Rome. Wiilchar went on diplomatic missions for Pope Paul I and kings Pippin III and Charles I.

Wilchar attended the Lateran Council of 769, where he was a prominent voice concerning the Antipope Constantine II at the first session. In the Liber pontificalis and in the acts of the council, his full title is given as "archbishop of the province of the Gauls from the city of Sens". Although he retained the archiepiscopal title until the end of his career, he does not seem to have remained bishop of Sens for much longer. The list of Sens bishops names five bishops between him and Beornred, who was bishop by 785 or 786 at the latest.

In December 771, Carloman died. Wilchar, Abbot Fulrad, the notary Maginarius, and the counts Warin and Adalhard met with Charles at Corbeny later that month. There, according to the Earlier Metz Annals, Wilchar and Fulrad anointed him as monarch over the whole kingdom. This ceremony may have been arranged by Wilchar, still bishop of Sens, "to show his elevated archiepiscopal status". He was at the time the only archbishop in Gaul. All the former metropolitan dioceses had seen a reduction in their status in the preceding centuries.

== Archbishop of the Gauls ==
Wilchar's loss of his diocese may be linked to the death of Carloman. He remained, however, as an archbishop with authority in all of Gaul but without a see. An identical position had been held by Boniface in 744–745 before the creation of the archbishopric of Mainz. Likewise, Wilchar was the "de facto successor to Chrodegang" at the head of the Frankish church. As archbishop, Wilchar may have consecrated Charles and his wife, Hildegard, as king and queen of the Lombards in Pavia in 774. He led another embassy to Rome in 775 and in 780 was recalled by Pope Hadrian I.

Sometime before 786, probably in 780 or 781, Wilchar, with papal permission, consecrated the Goth Egila as a peripatetic bishop in Spain. This is the second recorded time that Wilchar received authorization to consecrate a bishop by himself. The mission was a disaster. Archbishop Elipandus of Toledo accused Egila of falling in with the heretical sect of Migetius, while Elipandus was accused of adhering to Adoptionism. According to a letter of Hadrian in the Codex Carolinus, the mission was Wilchar's idea and he had assured the pope of Egila's theological bona fides. It is clear that Wilchar had the permission of Charles also for this mission and the king may even have been the initiator.

In 782, Mainz and Reims were raised to archbishoprics, but Wilchar retained this precedence as archbishop of the Gauls. He took part in the Council of Paderborn in 785. While there, he and Bishop Angilramn of Metz issued a privilege for the monastery of Salonnes, a dependency of Saint-Denis. He died in 786 or 787.

== Bishop of Vienne and Sion? ==
Wilchar is sometimes identified with the person of the same name recorded as archbishop of Vienne during the time of Pope Gregory III (731–741) and later as bishop of Sion. This person would have received the pallium in 731 and been still living in 791. The Royal Frankish Annals expressly call him "bishop of Sion" (Sitten), but this is usually regarded as an error for Sens.

As bishop of Sion, Wilchar is also sometimes identified with the abbot of Saint-Maurice d'Agaune in 773.
