= Jean, Cardinal of Lorraine =

French cardinal (1498–1550)

His Eminence Jean de Lorraine
- Cardinal, Bishop of Metz
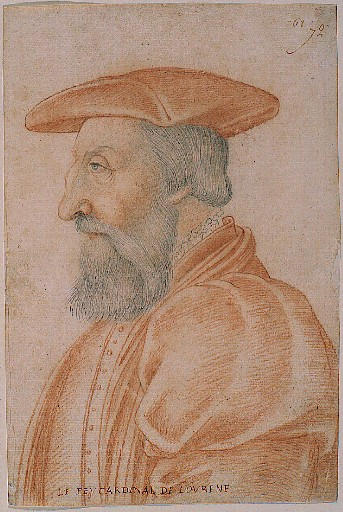
- Diocese: Metz
- Appointed: 26 July 1501
- Term ended: 10 May 1550
- Other post: Cardinal-deacon of Sant 'Onofrio

Orders
- Created cardinal: 28 May 1518 by Leo X
- Rank: Cardinal-deacon

Personal details
- Born: 9 April 1498 Bar-le-Duc, Lorraine
- Died: c. 18 May 1550 (aged 52) Neuvy-sur-Loire, France
- Parents: René II, Duke of Lorraine; Philippa of Guelders
- Coat of arms: Jean de Lorraine's coat of arms

Jean de Lorraine (9 April 1498 – c. 18 May 1550) was the third son of the ruling Duke of Lorraine, and a French cardinal, who was (at one time or another) archbishop of Reims (1532–1538), Lyon (1537–1539), and Narbonne (1524–1550), bishop of Metz, and Administrator of the dioceses of Toul, Verdun, Thérouanne, Luçon, Albi, Valence, Nantes and Agen (1538–1550). He was a personal friend, companion, and advisor of King Francis I of France. Jean de Lorraine was the richest prelate in the reign of Francis I, as well as the most flagrant pluralist. He is one of several cardinals known as the Cardinal de Lorraine.

== Biography ==
Born in Bar-le-Duc, Jean was the sixth child of twelve, of René II, Duke of Lorraine and his wife Philippa of Guelders, sister of Charles, Duke of Guelders. He was a younger brother of Antoine, Duke of Lorraine and Claude, Duke of Guise. His younger brother, François, Comte de Lambesc, died in the Battle of Pavia in 1525. In 1520 his mother retired to the Convent of S. Claire du Pont-à-Mousson, where she became a professed nun.

=== Bishop of Metz ===
In 1500 baby Jean succeeded Cardinal Raymond Peraudi as Coadjutor of his uncle Henri de Vaudemont-Lorraine, Bishop of Metz. The Chapter of the Cathedral gave its consent, on 3 November 1500, and Pope Alexander VI gave his consent in 1501. The Cardinal was compensated for his trouble with the monastery of S. Mansu in Toul. The purpose of such a strange arrangement was the desire of Duke René to keep the bishopric of Metz in family hands. Bishop Henri formally resigned the See of Metz on 16 July 1505 in favor of his nephew Jean, but, due to Jean's extreme youth, Henri continued as Administrator until his own death on 20 October 1505. From that point the Cathedral Chapter, whose Dean was the Bishop of Toul, assumed responsibility for the administration of the diocese, until Jean de Lorraine became twenty in 1518, with Jean receiving one-third of the episcopal revenues. Spiritual functions were in the hands of the Bishop of Nicopolis, Conrad de Heyden, O.Cist., suffragan of Metz.

Despite his youth, on 19 October 1517, following the death of Bishop Hugh de Hazards, Jean de Lorraine was elected Bishop of Toul by the Chapter of the cathedral. He resigned the bishopric in 1524.

It is conjectured that Jean was introduced to the French Court and met King Francis for the first time at the wedding of his brother Antoine to Renée de Bourbon on 26 June 1515.

=== Cardinal ===
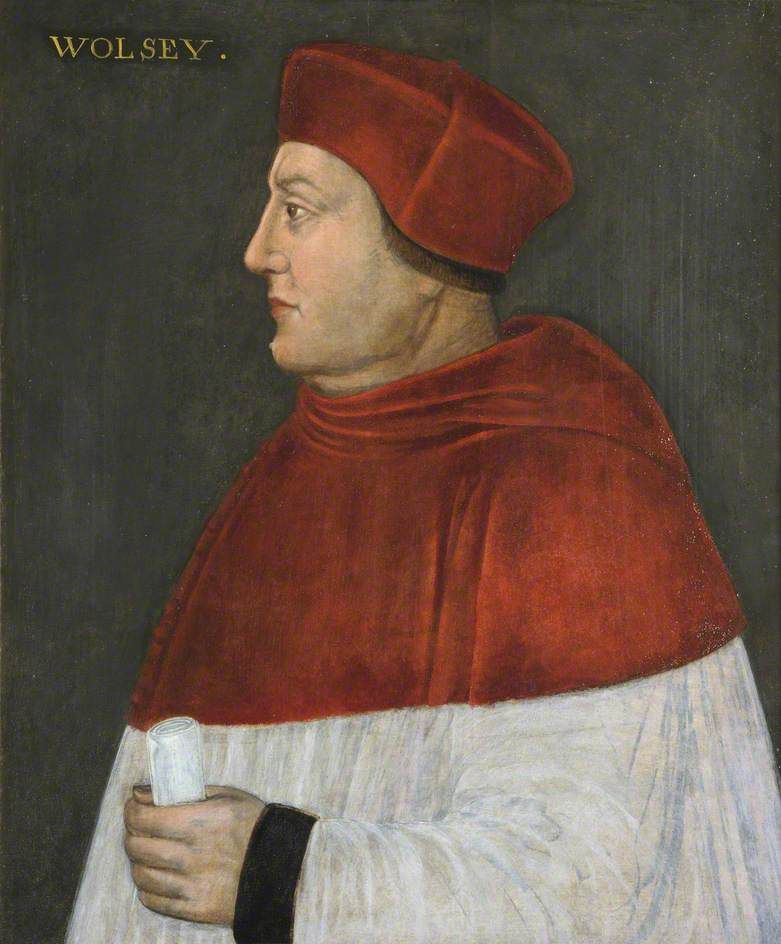
Cardinal Thomas Wolsey

On 28 May 1518 Jean de Lorraine, Bishop of Metz, aged twenty, was created a Cardinal-Deacon by Pope Leo X in his seventh Consistory for the creation of cardinals. Jean was the only cardinal created on that occasion. Leo, who had been made a cardinal himself at the age of thirteen, could hardly refuse the King of France on the grounds of youth. On 7 January 1519 he was assigned the Deaconry of S. Onofrio in Trastevere, and his red hat was sent to him in France. He visited Rome in April 1521, at which time he was admitted to Consistory. He had already returned home when Leo X died on 1 December 1521, and thus he did not attend the Conclave of 27 December 1521 − 9 January 1522, which elected Cardinal Adrian Florenszoon Dedel, who took the throne name Pope Adrian VI.

In 1520 Jean de Lorraine was present at the Field of the Cloth of Gold, along with Cardinals Adrien Gouffier de Boissy, François Louis de Bourbon, and Amanieu d'Albret; but he played no political role. And indeed his non-political position continued to be the case throughout the 1520s.

Cardinal Jean de Lorraine was appointed Bishop of Terouanne (Morinensis) on 29 October 1521, taking possession of his church on 7 January 1522. He held the See until 1535. From 1522 his career path is that of an individual who enjoys without interruption the favor of the King, all the way to the King's death in 1547. He enjoyed the status of favorite, along with the realities of familiar and counsellor.

=== Archbishop of Narbonne ===
On 7 January 1524 Cardinal Jean was named Archbishop of Narbonne, in succession to Giulio de' Medici who had been elected Pope Clement VII. He held the church until his death.

In August 1527 the Cardinal de Lorraine was appointed by King Francis to meet and greet Cardinal Thomas Wolsey, who had come to France to negotiate with King Francis, and to escort him to the French Court. He was not yet a royal advisor or a member of the Royal Council, but was being tested and groomed. He was, after all, only twenty-nine years old. Negotiations were conducted with Wolsey by royal commissioners, leading to the Treaty of Amiens, ratified by the King on 18 August.

The treaty addressed the joint English and French reaction to the Sack of Rome (1527) in May 1527 and the imprisonment of Pope Clement VII in the Castel S. Angelo. But the Cardinal de Lorraine had no part in that business. The principal negotiator was the Chancellor, Antoine du Prat. He was, however, one of the four French cardinals who were present at Compiègne on 16 September and wrote, under Wolsey's leadership as Papal Legate, to the Pope, informing him that they were praying for his release from captivity and planned, if the Emperor should not accommodate them, to refuse any papal orders issued under duress. He also witnessed the investing of the Chancellor, Antoine du Prat, with the symbols of the cardinalate which had been granted him by the Pope at the request of King Francis. His growing importance is reflected in a list of precedence of 1528, in which he and the King of Navarre follow immediately after the King.

=== Abbeys: Cluny, Fécamp, Gorze ===
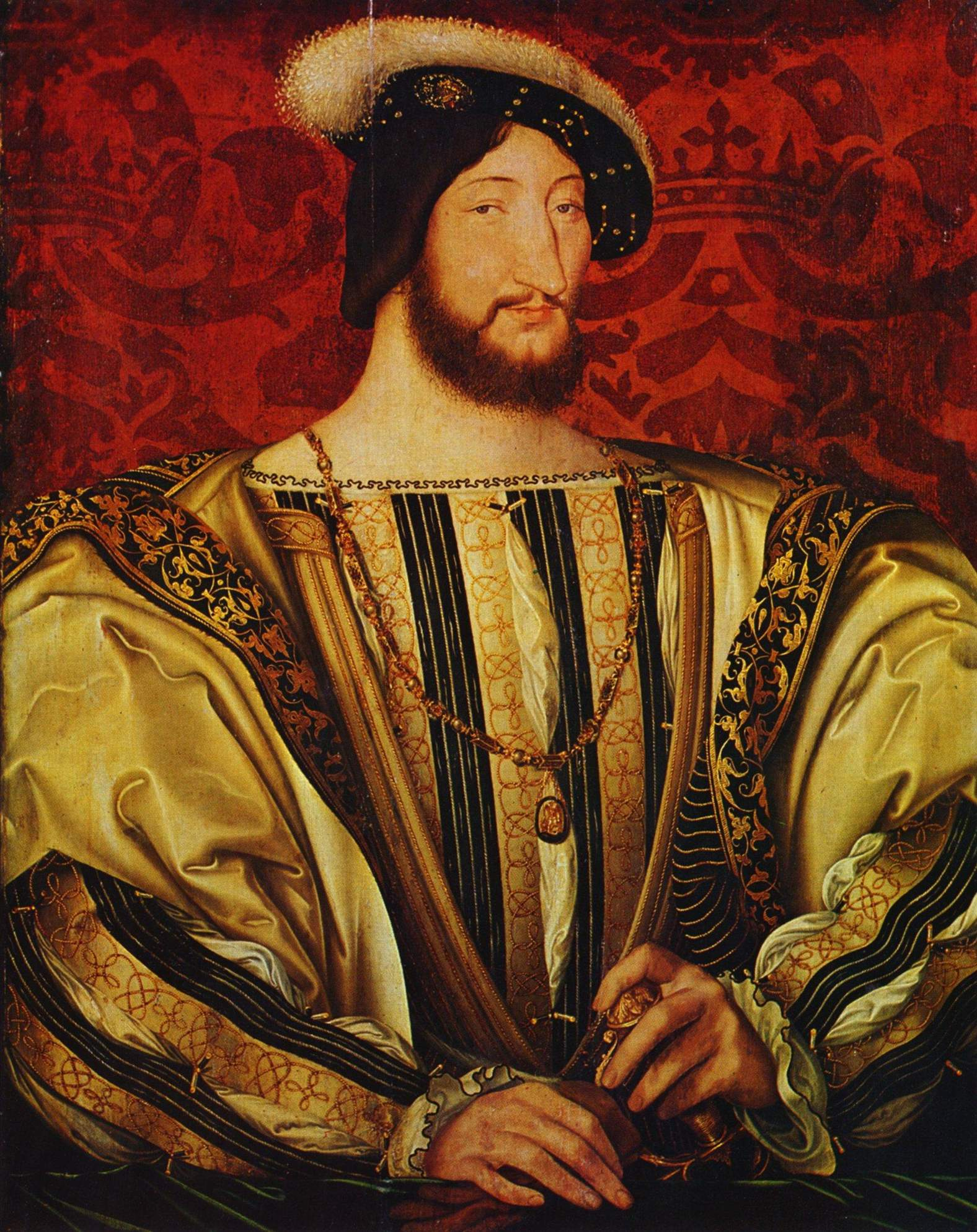
Francis I of France

In 1528 he was named Abbot Commendatory of the Abbey of Cluny by King Francis I, a benefice he held until his death in 1550. The monks of Cluny had tried to reassert their old rights of election, and had chosen Jacques le Roy, Abbot of Saint-Florent, to be the new abbot of Cluny, but the King and the Pope intervened, in accordance with the Concordat of Bologna of 1516, and Le Roy was made Archbishop of Bourges instead.

On 1 August 1530, Pope Clement VII granted the Cardinal of Lorraine an indult allowing him to hold and accumulate the benefices in his diocese of Narbonne and the benefices of his abbeys.

On 26 March 1531, King Francis signed an order to his treasurer to pay his lost wagers to the Sieur de Villiers, the result of a tennis match with the Cardinal de Lorraine and others on March 1.

In 1532, Jean de Lorraine was named Abbot Commendatory of the royal abbey of Fécamp by the patronage of King Francis I. He held the Abbey during his lifetime. In 1534 Pope Paul III named Cardinal de Lorraine his Apostolic Legate in the dioceses of Metz, Toul and Verdun.

Part of his ecclesiastical preferment he gave up in favour of his nephews, as part of the strategy of establishing the family of Lorraine permanently in various benefices.

Pope Clement VII died on 25 September 1534, having lived 56 years. The Conclave of 1534 opened on 10 October 1534, and Cardinal de Lorraine was present as the leader of the French faction, which numbered between ten and twelve members. Their candidate was Cardinal François de Tournon, who had negotiated the marriage of Henri, King Francis' second son, and Catherine de' Medici. Cardinal Alessandro Farnese was supported by Cardinal Ippolito d'Este and his fellow Florentine cardinals who had been created by Clement VII. The Italians favored Agostino Trivulzio, the Protector of France before the Holy See and the holder of several French episcopal benefices, whose uncles were Marshals of France, but he realized that he could not marshal sufficient votes to be elected. He therefore threw his support behind the oldest of the cardinals, Alessandro Farnese, hoping that Farnese's reign would be a short one and that he would be in a better position at the next conclave. Farnese was elected by acclamation on 11 October, the first day of voting, and was formally elected by ballot the next morning. He chose the name Paul III, and reigned for fifteen years. Trivulzio died the year before Paul did.

=== Royal Councillor ===
He became a regular member of the royal council in 1530. In 1536 he was entrusted with an embassy to Charles V, Holy Roman Emperor. He met the Emperor, who was travelling north to Genoa, at Siena on 24 April 1536. He spent three days with the Emperor explaining the concessions which Francis I was prepared to make, but Charles was prepared for war, and rejected the French overtures. After a quick trip to Rome to inform the Pope of the situation and to discover what the Pope's intentions were, Jean de Lorraine headed back north toward Bologna to try one last time to argue peace to the Emperor. The Pope, who was trying to maintain neutrality, sent legates to both sovereigns on 29 April to argue for peace, but it was without effect. The invasion of southern France by the Emperor was inevitable.

There survives a document showing that on 12 July 1536 the Cardinal de Lorraine was possessed of the dioceses of Metz, Toul and Verdun, of the Abbey of Gorze in southern Lorraine (1533–1542), and of the castellanies of Hattonchâtel, Dombasle-en-Argonne, Thilly, Mangiennes, Fresnes-en-Woevre, Dieudouard, and Sampigny. In 1537 he was granted the Abbey of Saint-Médard in Soissons, which he held for two years.

When the Dauphin Francis died at Château Tournon-sur-Rhône on 10 August 1536, the rest of the courtiers tried to delay presenting the disastrous news by telling the King that the Dauphin was increasingly ill. When Francis finally realized he was being lied to, it was the Cardinal de Lorraine who was left alone with the King by the courtiers and he had to confirm the news of the death of the King's son. The King retired to indulge his grief without witnesses, and left it to Cardinal de Lorraine to make the appropriate arrangements.

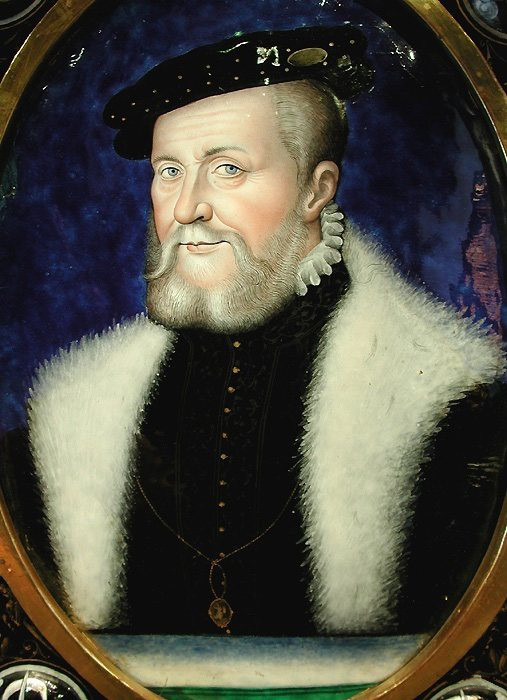
Constable Anne de Montmorency

In April–May 1537, Jean de Lorraine was sent as Ambassador to the Emperor and granted powers to negotiate with him. He returned to Court on 17 May. In accordance with the Concordat of Bologna of 1516, King Francis nominated Jean de Lorraine to the diocese of Lyon in 1537. He took possession of the diocese by procurator on 13 August 1537, and was immediately sent along with the Constable, Anne de Montmorency, on a diplomatic mission to the Emperor to put the final touches on a treaty of peace between France and the Empire. They returned to Narbonne on 13 January 1538, and Montmorency returned to report to the King at the end of January. In May and June the pair were at Nice, engaged in additional negotiations with the Emperor. On his return he resigned the administration of the diocese of Lyon in favor of Cardinal Ippolito d'Este, who was appointed by King Francis and whose bulls were dated 29 October 1539. The Cardinal de Lorraine had been Administrator for only two years and two months.

The Cardinal de Lorraine travelled with King Francis to Aigues-Mortes for his meeting with the Emperor Charles, which took place between 14 and 17 July 1538, and was present at at least one private meeting.

On 14 August 1540 the Cardinal de Lorraine renounced all his interests in the succession to the Duchy of Lorraine in favor of his brother, for a consideration of 50,000 francs.

On 22 March 1542, King Francis signed letters ratifying the nomination of the Cardinal de Lorraine as Abbot Commendatory of the Abbey of Blanche-Couronne in Brittany (1542–1548).

A document of 11 April 1544 indicates that the Cardinal was possessed of the Abbeys of Fécamp, Saint-Ouen, Marmoutier, and the Priory of La-Charité, from which the King had ordered extraordinary cutting of old-stand trees in their forests for the purpose of building galleys. The Cardinal was instructed to deliver the timber to Rouen at his expense.

=== Patronage ===
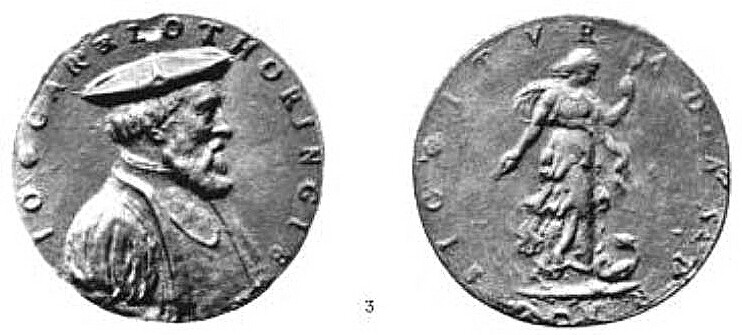
Jean de Lorraine, by Cellini

The Cardinal was also an open-handed patron of art and learning, as the protector and friend of the humanist scholar Erasmus, the poet and translator Clément Marot, and the satirist Rabelais. It has been argued that the character of Panurge in Gargantua and Pantagruel is based on the Cardinal de Lorraine, and his residence at the Hôtel de Cluny.

In 1527, upon the recommendation and urging of Erasmus, the Cardinal de Lorraine took on Claude Chansonette (Cantiuncula) as his Chancellor.

In 1537 Benvenuto Cellini, the Florentine jeweler, sculptor, and medallist, was in Paris, and was commissioned to create several pieces for King Francis I. On one occasion, the King invited Cellini to an after-dinner gathering, at which he found himself in the company of Mme. d'Estampes, the Cardinal de Lorraine, and the King of Navarre and his wife, Marguerite, the sister of King Francis, the Dauphin and the Dauphine. Cellini produced a medal of the Cardinal de Lorraine. The reverse shows the allegorical figure Truth, holding a mirror and a compass, with the legend SIC•ITUR•AD•ASTRA ('This is the way to the stars').

In 1549 at Piacenza (not the Plaisance in the south of France) he met the Franciscan André Thevet, one of the future chaplains of Queen Catherine de' Medici, and encouraged him (par l'autorité et faveur duquel, j'ay eu l'opportunité de faire le voyage de Ierusalem) to make his journey to the Holy Land and the Levant, which began his career as a cosmographer.

=== Conclave of 1549–1550 ===
Cardinal Jean de Lorraine participated in the Conclave following the death of Pope Paul III, which began on 29 November 1549. The Cardinal de Guise, Jean de Lorraine's nephew, had been instructed (by the King, it was said) to support the Cardinal de Lorraine, then the Cardinal de Tournon, and any other French cardinals; failing those, he was to work for Salviati, Ridolfi or de Cupis. Ridolfi took himself out of the contest when he died during the Conclave. It is recorded that, on the fifteenth Scrutiny on 18 December, even before Guise's arrival, Lorraine had received five votes. Jean de Lorraine, though, did not arrive in the Conclave until 29 December, by which time alliances and antipathies had solidified. In the evening of 7/8 February 1550, Cardinal Giovanni Maria Ciocchi del Monte, aged sixty-three, was elected and chose the throne name Julius III. Julius III, was crowned on 22 February 1550, the Feast of St. Peter's Chair.

The Cardinal de Lorraine died from a stroke in Neuvy-sur-Loire on 18 May 1550, on his way back to France from Italy. He was buried in Nancy in the Church of Saint-François-des-Cordeliers. In his Last Will and Testament, he left 30,000 livres to the poor orphans of the Three Bishoprics, Metz, Toul, and Verdun.

== See also ==
- Duke of Lorraine
- Dukes of Lorraine family tree
- John of Gorze

== Bibliography ==
- Bellenger, Yvonne, ed. (1997). Le mécénat et l'influence des Guises. Actes du colloque organisé par le Centre de recherche sur la littérature de la Renaissance de l'Université de Reims. Paris: Honoré Champion. ISBN 978-2-85203-689-5.
- Carroll, Stuart (2011). Martyrs and Murderers: The Guise Family and the Making of Europe. Oxford: OUP Oxford. ISBN 978-0-19-161970-0.
- Collignon, Albert (1910). Le mécénat du Cardinal Jean de Lorraine: 1498-1550. Annales de l'Est, 24e année, fasc. 2. (in French). Paris: Berger-Levrault.
- Freedman, Richard (1997). "Le Cardinal Jean de Lorraine: Un Prélat de la Renaissance mécène de la musique". Le Mécénat et l'Influence des Guises. Actes du colloque organisé par le Centre de recherche sur la littérature de la Renaissance de l'Université de Reims. Paris: 161–173. ISBN 9782852036895.
- Michon, Cédric (2003). "Les richesses de la faveur à la Renaissance: Jean de Lorraine (1498–1550) et François Ier". Revue d'histoire moderne et contemporaine. 50 (3): 35–36, 39. JSTOR 20530983.
- Petruccelli della Gattina, Ferdinando (1864). Histoire diplomatique des conclaves (in French). Vol. Tome II. Paris: A. Lacroix, Verboeckhoven et cie. pp. 23–64.
- Gulik, Guilelmus van; Konrad Eubel (1923). L. Schmitz-Kallenberg (ed.). Hierarchia catholica medii aevi (in Latin). Vol. III (editio altera ed.). Münster: sumptibus et typis librariae Regensbergianae.
- Barbiche, Bernard; de Dainville-Barbiche, Ségolène (1985). "Les légats à latere en France et leurs facultés aux XVIe et XVIIe siècles". Archivum Historiae Pontificiae. 23: 93–165. JSTOR 23564223.
- Roudaut, François (1997). "Le cardinal de Lorraine, François de Guise et Joachim du Bellay". Le Mécénat et l'Influence des Guises. Actes du colloque organisé par le Centre de recherche sur la littérature de la Renaissance de l'Université de Reims. Paris: 425–442. ISBN 9782852036895.
- Starkey, David. "Representation through intimacy: A study in the symbolism of monarchy and Court office in early modern England".
- Guy, John Alexander, ed. (1997). The Tudor Monarchy. London: Arnold. pp. 42–78. ISBN 978-0-340-65219-0. [reprint of a 1977 article]
- Gallia Christiana, in provincias ecclesiasticas distributa (in Latin). Vol. Tomus sextus (6): Narbonensis. Paris: ex Typographia Regia. 1739.
- Gallia christiana: in provincias ecclesiasticas distributa : ... opera et studio Domni Dionysii Sammarthani. De provincia Remensi, ejusque suffraganeis Ambianensi, Silvanectensi et Boloniensi ecclesiis, ubi instrumenta omnium ad calcem colliguntur. T. 10 (in Latin). Vol. Tomus decimus (10). Paris: ex Typographia regia. 1751.
- Gallia christiana, in provincias ecclesiasticas distributa (in Latin). Vol. Tomus undecimus (11): Rouen. Paris: excudebat Johannes- Baptista Coignard, regis & Academiae Gallicae Architypographus. 1759.

Catholic Church titles
Preceded by Henri II of Lorraine-Vaudémont	Bishop of Metz; 1505–1550	Succeeded by Charles of Lorraine
Preceded by Hugh des Hazards	Administrator of the diocese of Toul; 1517–1524	Succeeded by Hector de Ailly-Rochefort
Preceded by Gaspard de Tournon	Administrator of the diocese of Valence; 1520–1522	Succeeded by Antoine Duprat
Preceded by François de Melun	Bishop of Thérouanne; 1521–1535	Succeeded by François de Créquy
Preceded by Louis of Lorraine	Bishop of Verdun; 1523–1544	Succeeded by Nicolas de Mercœur
Preceded by Ladislaus Dufau	Administrator of the diocese of Luçon; 1523–1524	Succeeded by Louis de Bourbon-Vendome
Preceded by Giulio di Giuliano de' Medici	Archbishop of Narbonne; 1524–1550	Succeeded by Ippolito d'Este
Preceded by Hector de Ailly-Rochefort	Administrator of the diocese of Toul; 1532–1537	Succeeded by Antoine Pellagrin
Preceded by Robert de Lenoncourt	Archbishop of Reims; 1533–1550	Succeeded by Charles of Lorraine
Preceded by Antoine Duprat	Archbishop of Albi; 1535–1550	Succeeded by "Cardinal de Guise"
Preceded by François de Rohan	Administrator of the diocese of Lyon; 1537–1539	Succeeded by Ippolito d'Este of Modena
Preceded by Marc-Antoine de La Rovère	Administrator of the diocese of Agen; 1538–1550	Succeeded by Matteo Bandello
Preceded by Louis d'Acigné	Bishop of Nantes; 1542–1550	Succeeded by Charles of Lorraine
Preceded by Antoine Pellagrin	Administrator of the diocese of Toul; 1542–1543	Succeeded by Toussaint de Hossey
