= Migetians =

Christian sect in Muslim Spain

The Migetians or Cassianists were a rigorist Christian sect in Muslim Spain in the late 8th and early 9th centuries. Their writings are lost and they are known primarily through the letters of their opponents, Archbishop Elipand of Toledo and Pope Hadrian I. The founder of the sect, Migetius, was condemned as a heretic by the Spanish church before 785 and again in 839. He managed to convert a bishop sent from Francia, which briefly brought the sect to the attention of foreign powers. A larger consequence of this was to bring to Frankish and papal awareness the prevalence of Adoptionism in the Spanish church.

The Migetians were not Adoptionists, but were opposed to the Spanish ecclesiastical hierarchy, declaring absolute loyalty to Rome. They tended towards and may have been influenced by Donatism in their rigorous standards for priests. They preached separatism from Muslims and imposed dietary restrictions to uphold separation. They may have held unorthodox Trinitarian views.

== Name ==
The names "Migetians" and "Cassianists" are contemporary, but originate with the sect's critics. Elipand in one letter refers to the "sect (heresy) of the Migetians" (Migetianorum haeresis) and in his letter to Migetius refers to the latter's "followers" (socios). In his "letter [on behalf] of the bishops of Spain to the bishops of France", Elipand calls Migetius the "teacher of the Casiani and Salibanii" (Casianorum et Salibaniorum magister). Neither term is clear. The second has been taken to be an error for Sabellians, but this is unlikely. At least three explanations for "Casiani" have been advanced:

1. They are named for Casae Nigrae, the see of Donatus.
2. They are named after a place, probably a church dedicated either to Cassian of Tangier or Cassian of Imola.
3. They are named after John Cassian on account of his and their reputed Semipelagianism.

The name Migetius is misspelled Mingentius in the papal letters.

== History ==
The sect had its origins in the teaching of Migetius in the early 780s. The earliest reference to the teaching is in a letter Elipand wrote to Migetius between 782 and 785 (probably closer to 782). Migetius is mentioned in two more of Elipand's six surviving letters. He was active in Baetica, then part of the Emirate of Córdoba. Judging from a comment by Elipand, he may have been a priest.

Sometime before 786, probably in 780 or 781, Archbishop Wilchar of Sens, with the approval of Pope Hadrian, consecrated a Goth named Egila as a peripatetic bishop in Spain. Despite the catechetical examinations which Wilchar had him undergo, Egila soon came under the influence of Migetius. Three subsequent letters from Pope Hadrian, preserved in the Codex epistolaris Carolinus (nos. 95–97), (Note: These are the only three letters in the Codex not addressed to a Carolingian. They are usually dated to between 785 and 791, but they must be earlier than the date of Wilchar's death, possibly in 786. Despite the numbering, the chronological order of the letters is 96–97–95. See Cavadini 1988, p. 28, and Bullough 1962.) shed light on Migetian belief and on the political ramifications of Migetianism.

According to Hadrian, the mission of Egila was proposed to him by Wilchar. For this Wilchar required the permission of the Frankish king, Charlemagne. Some scholars have even seen Charlemagne as the likely initiator in an endeavour to secure control over the Spanish church. Hadrian's first two letters were a response to a now lost letter from Egila in which the bishop protested his orthodoxy against rumours of heresy. When Hadrian's first letter (c. 784) (Note: According to Bullough 1962, the letter must be later than April 781 and probably dates to 784–785.) failed to reach is addressee, Charlemagne requested that he send a second one (c. 785). In both, the pope rejects the charge of heresy against Egila and his assistant, a priest named John.

Sometime between 782 and October 785, Migetius was condemned by some formal process, possibly a synod of the Spanish church, in Seville. This is known from a letter that Elipand wrote to an abbot named Fidelis in October 785, in which he also informs Fidelis that he has received help from Bishop Ascaric of Braga against the Migetians. This letter was known in Rome by early 786 and sealed the fate of Egila. (Note: According to Cavadini 1988, p. 31 n43, Franz Ansprenger expressed doubt that Egila really was a Migetian. He suspected that he was set up by Elipand, a political rival.) In a third letter addressed to "all the orthodox bishops living throughout the whole of Spain", Hadrian confirms that Egila and John had fallen in with the Migetians and were preaching false doctrines. He also implies that Egila had usurped a diocese, possibly Elvira or Mérida, although he had been expressly forbidden to take a permanent see when he was commissioned as a peripatetic bishop.

A synod held at Córdoba in 839 remembered Egila as the founder of the Migetian sect. It condemned the "Acephali called Cassianists" who had been founded by a bishop named "Agila of Ementia" and who still had adherents in some parishes, mainly in the Egabrense (the region around Egabro), particularly the village of Epagro. The Cassianists only considered as valid the ordinations performed by Agila (Egila). Saul of Córdoba, writing to Paul Albar in 862, lumps the Migetians together with Donatists and Luciferians as rigorists, but this is not proof that the sect was still active at that date.

== Beliefs ==
The Migetians were ritual and ethical rigorists who advocated separation from Muslims and were hostile to the Mozarabic church. Scholars disagree about whether the Migetians were motivated by specific abuses in the church, by political opposition to collaboration with Islamic rule or by apocalypticism. No works by adherents survive, although Migetius wrote at least one work. He sent a copy to Elipand, who mentions it in his letter. It is now lost.

Elipand accuses Migetius of four errors in his letter addressed to him. First, he accuses him of holding priests to an exceedingly high standard of moral purity and of referring to himself as free from sin. The precise nature of Migetius' claims is difficult to discern in Elipand's letter, but it has been likened to Donatism, an ancient African heresy. African influence on the church in Spain was high under the Visigoths and at least one Donatist work, a commentary on Revelation by Tyconius, was in circulation at precisely this time, since Beatus of Liébana cites it in his own Commentary on the Apocalypse.

Second, Elipand accuses Migetius of prohibiting eating with pagans (i.e., Muslims) or eating food associated with paganism. Elipand considered this command to be contrary to the practice of Jesus. Third, Elipand accused him of exaggerating the importance of the city of Rome. According to Elipand, Migetius saw it as the city in which Christ dwells, whose diocese was without blemish. He interpreted Matthew 16:18 as a reference to Rome and regarded it as the New Jerusalem of Revelation.

Fourth, Elipand accuses Migetius of teaching that the three persons of the Trinity—Father, Son and Holy Spirit—were incarnated as David, Jesus and Paul, respectively. This claim has often been dismissed as too bizarre to be accurate and treated as a distortion or misunderstanding on the part of Elipand.

In his letter to Fidelis, Elipand also accuses Migetius of miscalculating the date of Easter. Pope Hadrian I was also informed that Migetius did not date Easter according to the Nicene method, which was almost certainly the method in use by Elipand.

Pope Hadrian's first letter to Egila confirms that the issues being disputed by Migetius were the date of Easter, dietary regulations concerning pork, the compatibility of predestination and free will and practices that represented a compromise with Islam, such as living in common with Jews and Muslims, marrying unbelievers and the marriage of priests. Hadrian responds to the predestinarian controversy by quoting the African theologian Fulgentius, who was especially popular in Spain.

== Bibliography ==
- Bullough, Donald A. (1962). "The Dating of Codex Carolinus Nos. 95, 96, 97, Wilchar, and the Beginnings of the Archbishopric of Sen". Deutsches Archiv für Erforschung des Mittelalters. 18: 223–230.
- Cavadini, John C. (1988). The Last Christology of the West: Adoptionism in Spain and in Gaul, AD 785–817 (Doctoral thesis). Yale University.
- Cavadini, John C. (1993). The Last Christology of the West: Adoptionism in Spain and Gaul, 785–820. University of Pennsylvania Press. doi:10.9783/9781512801149. ISBN 9781512801149.
- Christys, Ann (2002). Christians in al-Andalus (711–1000). Routledge.
- Collins, Roger (1983). Early Medieval Spain: Unity in Diversity, 400–1000. Macmillan.
- Collins, Roger (1998). Charlemagne. Macmillan. doi:10.1007/978-1-349-26924-2. ISBN 978-0-333-65055-4.
- Collins, Roger (2012). Caliphs and Kings: Spain, 796–1031. Wiley Blackwell.
- Fried, Johannes (2016) [2013]. Charlemagne. Translated by Peter Lewis. Harvard University Press.
- Isla Frez, Amancio (2020). "Migecianos, casianistas y la definición de una herejía (fin del siglo VIII – principio del IX)". Studia Historica. Historia Medieval. 38 (2): 189–219. doi:10.14201/shhme2020382189219. hdl:10366/146384. S2CID 234435024.
