= Violette Nozière (murderer) =

French convicted murderer (1915–1966)

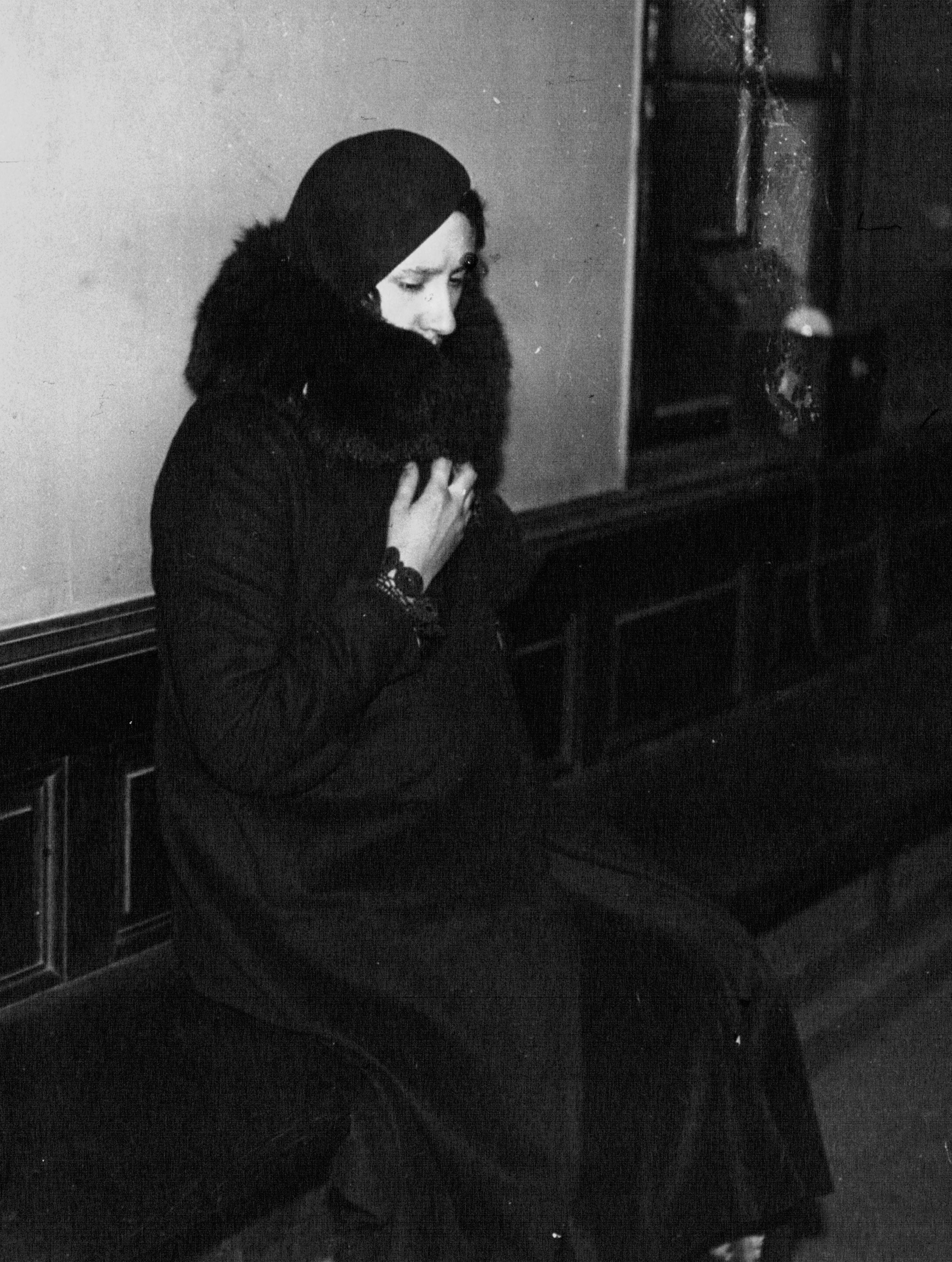
- Nozière in 1933
- Born: 11 January 1915; Neuvy-sur-Loire, France
- Died: 26 November 1966 (aged 51); Le Petit-Quevilly, France
- Known for: murdering her father, accusations of incest, rehabilitation after serving many years in prison
- Criminal charges: Murder and attempted murder
- Criminal penalty: Death penalty, later commuted to hard labor for life followed, in the end, by complete réhabilitation

Violette Nozière (11 January 1915 – 26 November 1966) was a French woman convicted in 1934 of poisoning her parents, killing her father and seriously injuring her mother, in their Paris apartment in August 1933. The case became one of the most closely followed criminal trials of interwar France. Violette, then eighteen, claimed she had acted to free herself from years of sexual abuse by her father, an allegation the prosecution rejected and that has never been independently confirmed. The "Nozière affair" divided public opinion along political lines, drew the support of the Surrealist movement, and remains a recurring subject of French historical and cultural commentary, notably through Claude Chabrol's 1978 film, Violette Nozière.

Sentenced to death, Violette was reprieved by presidential pardon, had her sentence progressively reduced, and was released in 1945. She later married, raised five children under a changed name, and in 1963 was granted a judicial "réhabilitation"—a rare restoration of civil standing for someone convicted of a capital crime. She died of cancer in 1966.

== Early life ==
Violette Nozière was born in Neuvy-sur-Loire, in the Nièvre department, the only child of Jean-Baptiste "Baptiste" Nozière, a locomotive engine driver for the Paris–Lyon–Méditerranée railway company, and Germaine Hézard. Given her father’s position in the railroad company, Violette's family would be considered to be solidly middle class.^{:13-15}

Her parents married shortly before her birth. Germaine was already several months pregnant. The family settled in Paris's 12th arrondissement, near the Gare de Lyon, living in a small two-room apartment at 9 rue de Madagascar that afforded the family little privacy.

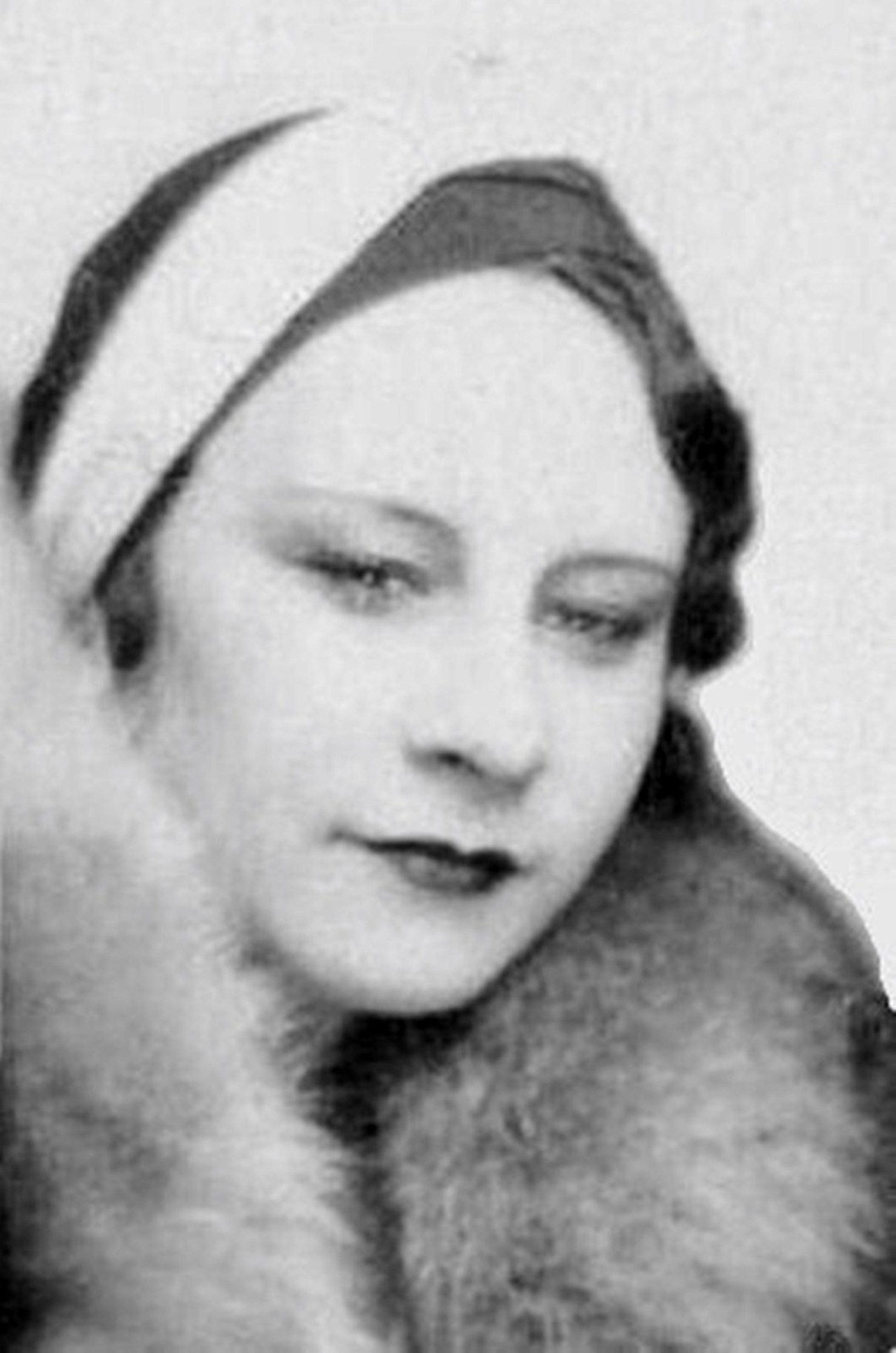
Violette Nozière in 1933

Violette was a capable student in primary school, earning her certificat d'études, but her academic performance and conduct deteriorated as she moved through the École primaire supérieure Sophie Germain, the Lycée Voltaire, and finally the Lycée Fénelon. She was frequently ill during her teenage years.A school report described her in unflattering terms, citing laziness, deceitfulness, and a poor influence on classmates.

By her mid-teens she had begun a pattern of lying about her family's social position—describing her father as a senior railway engineer and her mother as a fashion-house "première"—and had taken several lovers, including a fellow student. She also began stealing money from her parents and from shopkeepers, and supplemented her income through occasional prostitution, euphemistically referring to these encounters in her own writings.

In early 1933, Nozière learned she had contracted syphilis. She persuaded a complicit doctor to issue a false certificate implying the disease was hereditary, in order to convince her parents—falsely—that they themselves were responsible for her infection. This triggered a serious family confrontation. The previous winter, after being caught shoplifting, she had left her parents a note threatening suicide, but was found safe near the Seine.

== Murder ==
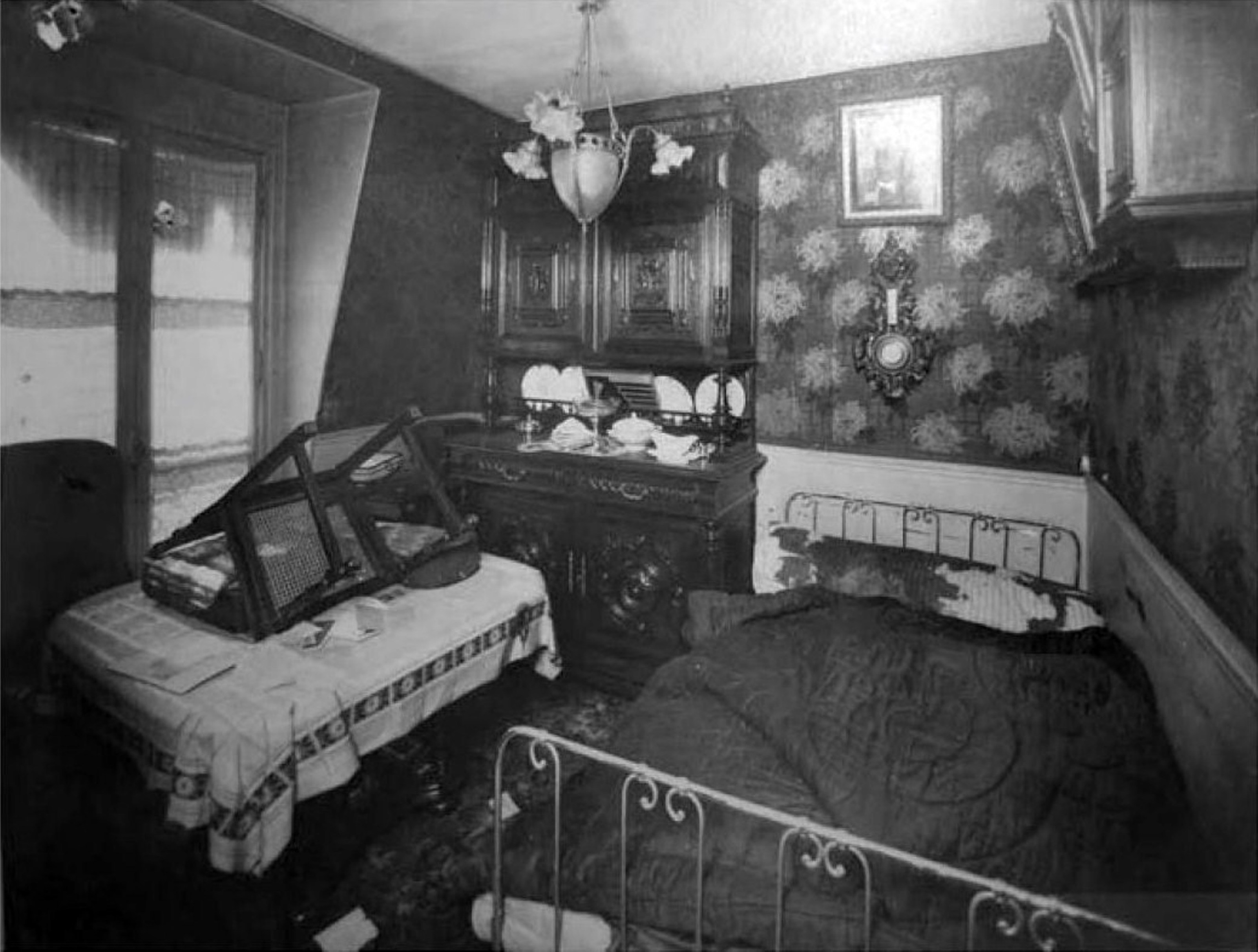
The crime scene was on the 6th floor. Police Commissioner Robert Gueudet noted in his report: "The dining room, traces of blood on the bolster, the bed sheet, on the wall, on the floor."

On 23 March 1933, Nozière gave her parents doses of the sedative Somnifène, telling them it was medicine prescribed by their doctor. Violette took the same dose as her parents at the same time. That night a fire broke out in the apartment; her parents were treated for smoke inhalation, and the incident was not linked to poisoning at the time.

On 21 August 1933, she administered a much larger dose of the same drug, again disguised as medicine. Her father died; her mother survived because she discarded half of the dose.^{:97} Nozière then stole money from the apartment, left, went shopping, dined and danced with friends. She returned the next day to the apartment, opening the gas taps in an apparent attempt to suggest the deaths were a suicide.^{:97-100} She alerted neighbours, who summoned the fire brigade and police. Investigators quickly found inconsistencies that pointed to her involvement —an unupdated household expense ledger and a gas meter reading inconsistent with attempted asphyxiation.

== Flight, arrest, and confession ==
Brought to the hospital where her mother was recovering, Nozière fled when she realized her mother might identify her, an act treated by police as effective self-incrimination. She spent roughly a week as a fugitive in Paris before being arrested in the 7th arrondissement on 28 August, after being denounced to police by an acquaintance.

Under questioning by Commissioner Marcel Guillaume, a senior detective who had previously worked the Bonnot Gang and Landru cases, Nozière confessed to the poisoning. She told police and the examining magistrate, Edmond Lanoire, that her father had sexually abused her for roughly six years, beginning when she was twelve. She claimed that did not tell her mother because her father had told her that she was as guilty as he was and that he would kill her and himself if she did. She said that she had decided to kill him to escape this abuse.^{:109-113}

Nozière also insisted that she had not tried to kill her mother and that she had acted alone. Investigators also recovered pornographic materials and a cloth allegedly used by her father for ejaculation in order to prevent pregnancy, which Nozière cited as supporting evidence for the accusation of incest. Her mother offered an alternative explanation for the same object, and the dispute was never resolved.

Inspector Guillaume later wrote that he found Violette's account credible and believed she deserved a degree of leniency, though he was never called to testify to this effect at trial. Two acquaintances of Nozière (Pierre Camus and Jean Leblanc) also reported that she had confided to them about incest; Pierre Camus quoted her as saying "my father occasionally forgot I was his daughter". Violette's mother, Germaine, adamantly denied her daughter's allegations.^{:122-123}

== Press coverage ==
The case dominated French newspapers for months, with major dailies, weeklies and the new illustrated crime press, competing for sensational coverage. At the time, the public accusation of incest was virtually unheard of—indeed, taboo—especially as a subject for the popular press. The press coverage began at the early phases of the investigation, with journalists not only contributing information through their own private investigations, but also apparently obtaining access to what should have been the privileged information of the magistrate.

Almost immediately (and before the trial), nearly all coverage by the mass circulation press was virulently dismissive of Violette's version of the story.^{:113-114} The press portrays her as a bad element, vicious and a liar: she would see different men, sporadically, and without any plans for marriage. She was the “monster in petticoats” and her incest story was nothing but a contemptible defense that sullied her father’s good name.

Historians have noted that, through the press coverage, the case became a vehicle for broader anxieties in early-1930s France. It raised issues of sexual mores, the female role in intrafamily violence and the younger versus the older generations. This journalistic phenomenon was among the first, and almost certainly the first in France, to deal with, even obliquely, the issue of incest (though without showing any sympathy or understanding of the victim). That would come decades later.

== Trial ==
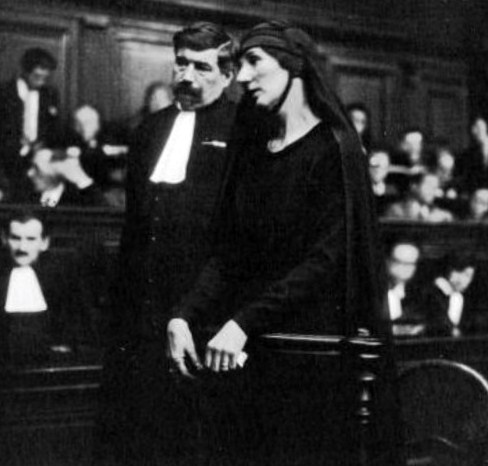
Germaine Nozière and her lawyer M.Hézard giving evidence in 1934

The trial opened before the Cour d'assises of the Seine in Paris on 12 October 1934, the day after the assassination of King Alexander I of Yugoslavia in Marseille had dominated headlines.^{:229} Even so, the courtroom was reportedly crowded that day and throughout the trial.

Nozière was defended by Henri Géraud and René de Vésinne-Larue, the latter of whom would represent her for the following three decades. The prosecution, led by advocate-general Gaudel, argued that the poisoning was motivated, not by sexual abuse, but by greed— it conjectured that Nozière wanted to inherit the roughly 165,000 francs that her parents had saved. It noted that the fact that her father had tested negative for syphilis undermined her account.

Germaine Nozière formally joined the prosecution as a civil party against her own daughter—an unusual step— though she would later, in court, tearfully ask the jury for mercy on her daughter's behalf.^{:237-239}

Court-appointed psychiatrists found Nozière fully responsible for her actions,^{:237-239} a conclusion her defense disputed by invoking, among other comparisons, the recent Papin sisters case, in which a death sentence had later been reduced on grounds of diminished responsibility. The defense's case did not center primarily on the incest allegation, instead arguing chiefly that Nozière had no rational motive to harm her mother.

The all-male jury, after only about an hour of deliberation, convicted her without mitigating circumstances and sentenced her to death on 13 October 1934. An appeal to the Cour de cassation was rejected in December.^{:255}

== Clemency and imprisonment ==
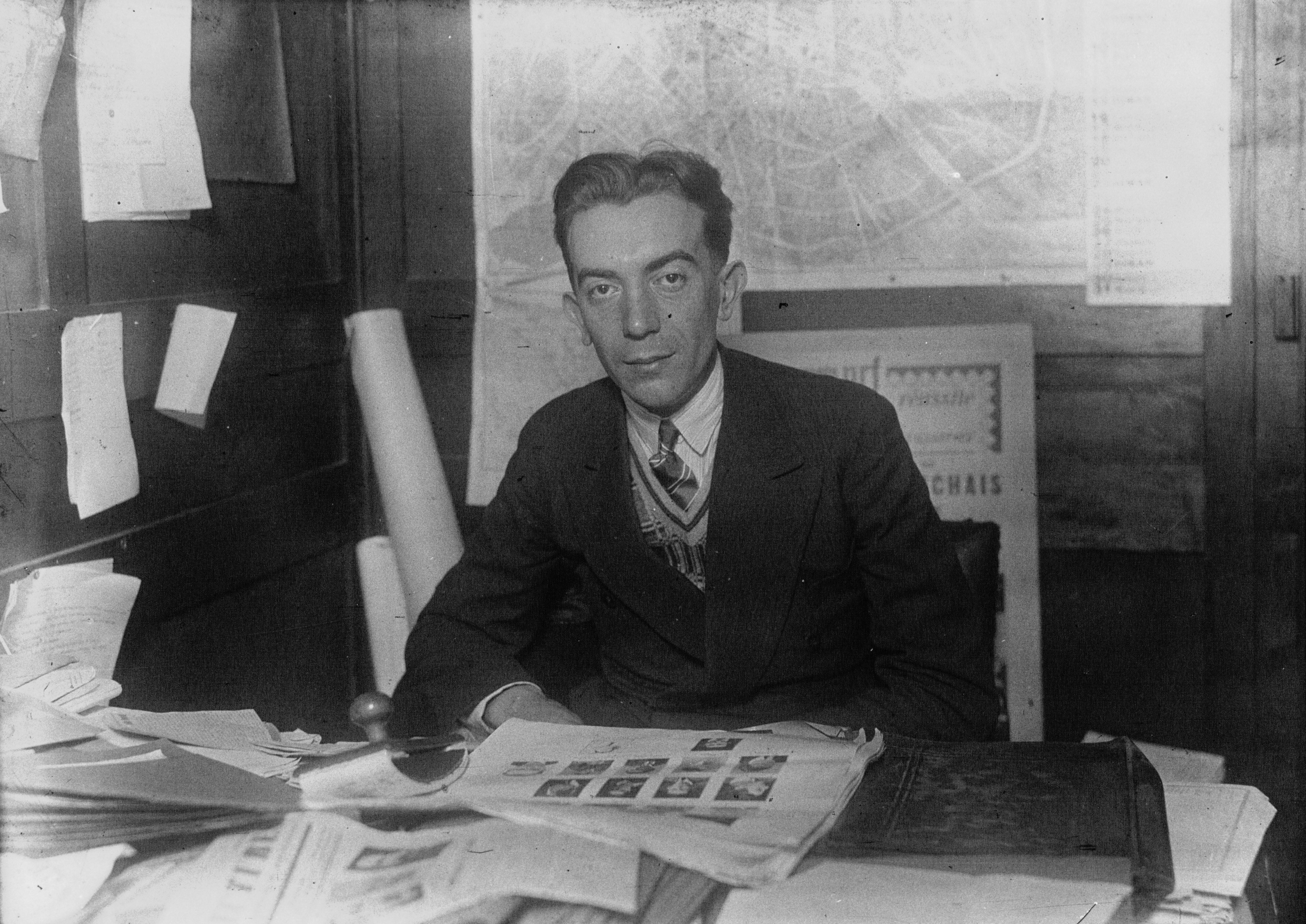
The writer Marcel Aymé came to the defense of Violette Nozière, saying: “If the incest indeed occurred, what immeasurable pity the poor woman deserved — and what forgiveness!”

Nozière's death sentence—considered at the time to be largely symbolic, since no woman had been executed in France since 1887—was commuted to forced labour for life by President Albert Lebrun in December 1934, following an appeal for clemency by her lawyers and a public campaign that included an open plea from the writer Marcel Aymé. She was transferred to the Centrale de Haguenau in Alsace, where she turned to Catholicism, attracting praise for her conduct from the prison authorities and the Dominican sisters who worked there.

In October 1937, Violette Nozière recanted her accusations against her father. This belated retraction, in a letter from Violette to her mother, was published in the press through her lawyer, René de Vésinne-Larue In exchange for publishing the main excerpts from this open letter, the major newspapers paid Germaine Nozière financial compensation. This material reward relieved Ms. Nozière of the legal costs of the case, which she had previously borne. This letter contributed to a reconciliation between mother and daughter.

With the German invasion in 1940, Nozière was transferred to the women's central prison at Rennes. Under the Vichy regime, in August 1942, Marshal Philippe Pétain reduced her sentence to 12 years of forced labour, reportedly following intervention from the Catholic Church and citing her exemplary conduct. She worked in the prison's accountancy office in her final years of detention.^{:264-268}

== Release and later life ==
Nozière was pardoned by Charles de Gaulle in 1945, who also subsequently lifted the twenty-year ban on her residing in France that had accompanied her commuted sentence. With this decision, she had benefited from clemency decisions made by three separate heads of state (Le Brun, Pétain, and de Gaulle). She moved to Paris and took work as a secretary-bookkeeper under her mother's name, Germaine Hézard, to conceal her identity.^{:268}

In Rennes, she had become close to Pierre Coquelet, the son of the prison's registrar-accountant; after her release he left his job and joined her, divorcing his first wife in 1946. The couple married in December 1946 in Neuvy-sur-Loire—by then heavily damaged by Allied bombing during the war. They had five children between 1947 and 1959, none of whom, reportedly, were told of their mother's past during her lifetime. The family ran several hotel and café-restaurant businesses in Normandy over the following years, including establishments near Rouen.

Pierre Coquelet was seriously injured in a road accident in 1950 and died from injuries sustained in a second car accident in 1961. Nozière, by then in her mid-forties, raised their five children alone, with help from her mother, Germaine, who lived with the family until her death in 1968.

In 1963, after a long campaign by her lawyer Vésinne-Larue, the Cour d'appel de Rouen granted Nozière a judicial réhabilitation, restoring her full civil rights and formally clearing her criminal record. Commentators have described this as without precedent for someone previously condemned to death for an ordinary-law crime. Nozière said at the time that she had sought the réhabilitation chiefly for the sake of her children.

== Death ==
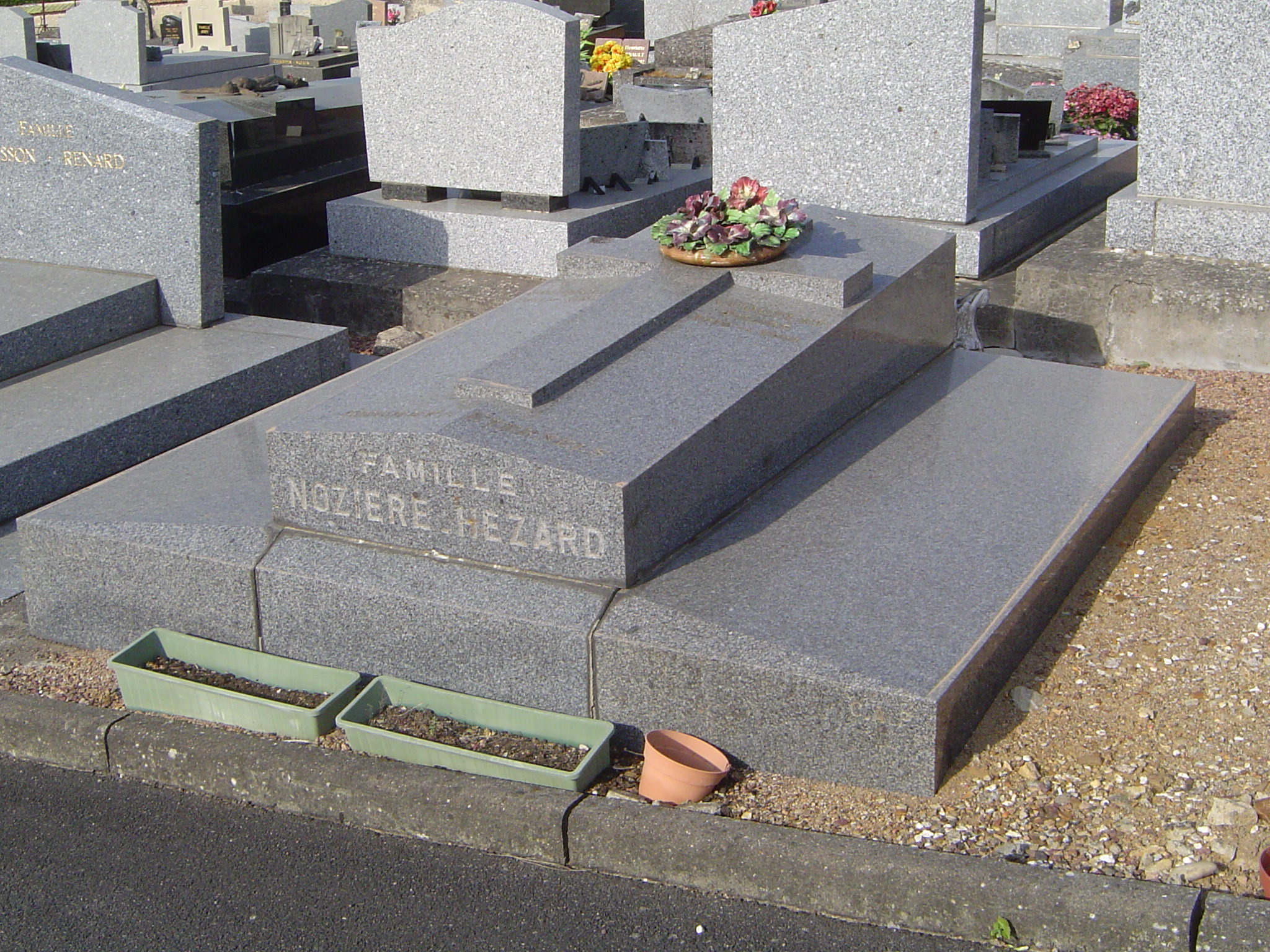
Tomb of Violette Nozière in Neuvy-sur-Loire in the Nièvre department.

Nozière was diagnosed with breast cancer in 1963 and underwent surgery in Rouen. The disease later metastasized to her bones. She concealed the severity of her illness from her family for some time and continued running the household and a family business while declining strong painkillers in order to remain lucid. She died at her home in Le Petit-Quevilly, near Rouen, on 26 November 1966, and was buried in the family plot in Neuvy-sur-Loire alongside her husband, her mother, and the father she had killed.^{:275}

== Historical assessment and the incest question ==
Whether Jean-Baptiste Nozière had in fact sexually abused his daughter has never been conclusively established and remains a matter of historical debate. Commissioner Guillaume, who interviewed Nozière personally during the initial investigation, found her account credible, and her defense pointed to physical evidence—including pornographic materials found in the family home—that they argued was consistent with her claims. Prosecutors, by contrast, argued that the absence of any syphilis infection in her father undercut the abuse narrative, and pointed to evidence that Nozière had already begun stealing from her parents well before the poisonings, suggesting a financial motive tied to their savings. Nozière herself retracted the allegation in 1937, though by then she had strong incentives to do so —including her mother's forgiveness and financial considerations.

The American historian Sarah Maza, in her 2011 book, Violette Nozière: A Story of Murder in 1930s Paris, situates the case within the social tensions of working- and lower-middle-class Parisian life in the early 1930s, describing the affair's enduring "troubling ambiguity" and noting contemporary comparisons to the Dreyfus affair in the scale of public controversy it generated. French historian fr:Anne-Emmanuelle Demartini argues that Nozière, during her adolescence, exhibited a complex of symptoms that, today, would be associated with victims of incest (somatic reactions, declining investment in schooling, problems in sexual behavior, suicide threats and attempts). She also notes that, while this association is not proof, giving adequate analytical space to the possibility that Nozière was telling the truth, opens up possibilities for understanding the historical context in which this drama took place (both the crime itself and the public reaction to it).

In a 2017 book, Violette Nozière, la fleur du mal, Demartini argues that the case's popular resonance resides in the collision of the two taboos it embodied—parricide and incest—within a press culture eager to sensationalize both. The book positions the ongoing public and intellectual fascination with this case as stemming from the light it sheds on "the relationships between fathers and daughters, between parents and children, between men and women. Violette becomes the ‘flower of evil,' a dark icon of female emancipation and generational conflict in a France in crisis."

== Cultural legacy ==
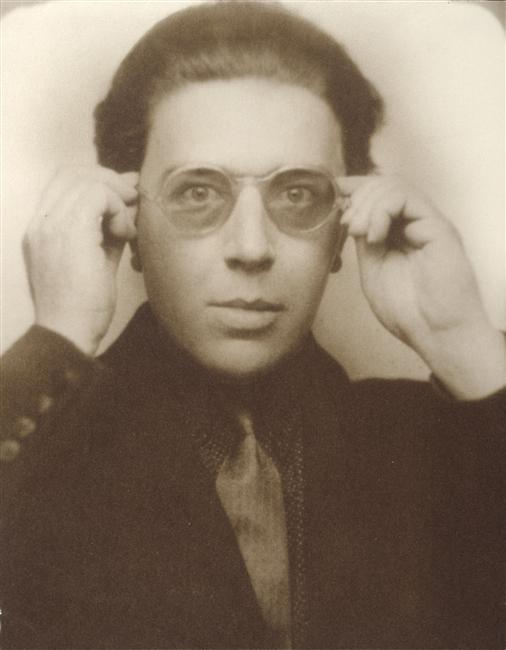
For André Breton, Violette Nozière became a living legend : she was "mythological to the tips of her nails"

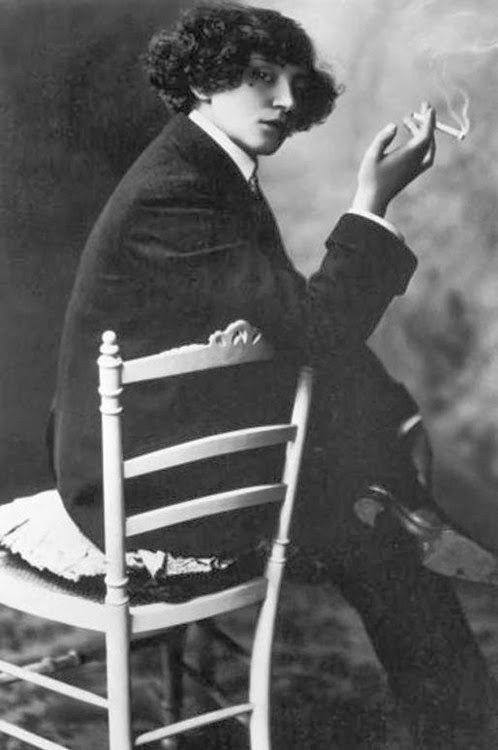
Colette did not believe in the possibility of Violette Nozière's redemption: "I thought of the wicked, criminal child, of the atmosphere of base lies she had created."

The case remains prominent in French culture. In December 1933, while the investigation was still under way, a group of Surrealists published a small illustrated volume titled Violette Nozières through a Brussels press, thereby avoiding the risk of prosecution in France. It included poems by André Breton, Paul Éluard, René Char, Benjamin Péret, and others, alongside artwork by Salvador Dalí, Max Ernst, René Magritte, Alberto Giacometti, and Yves Tanguy, with a cover by Hans Bellmer and a photograph by Man Ray. The Surrealists denounced the male cohort of policemen, investigators, journalists and judges that ran the case. They presented Nozière as a victim of patriarchal and bourgeois hypocrisy.

The case has been revisited in French popular culture and scholarship. In 1978, film director Claude Chabrol made a film based on this case. The film Violette Nozière, based on a novel by Jean-Marie Fitère and starring Isabelle Huppert in the title role alongside Stéphane Audran and Jean Carmet, dramatizes the case while preserving much of its ambiguity. Huppert won the Best Actress award at the 1978 Cannes Film Festival for the role, and Audran received a César Award for Best Supporting Actress.

== See also ==
- Capital punishment in France
