= National Memorial Fort Breendonk =

Breendonk Fort National Memorial
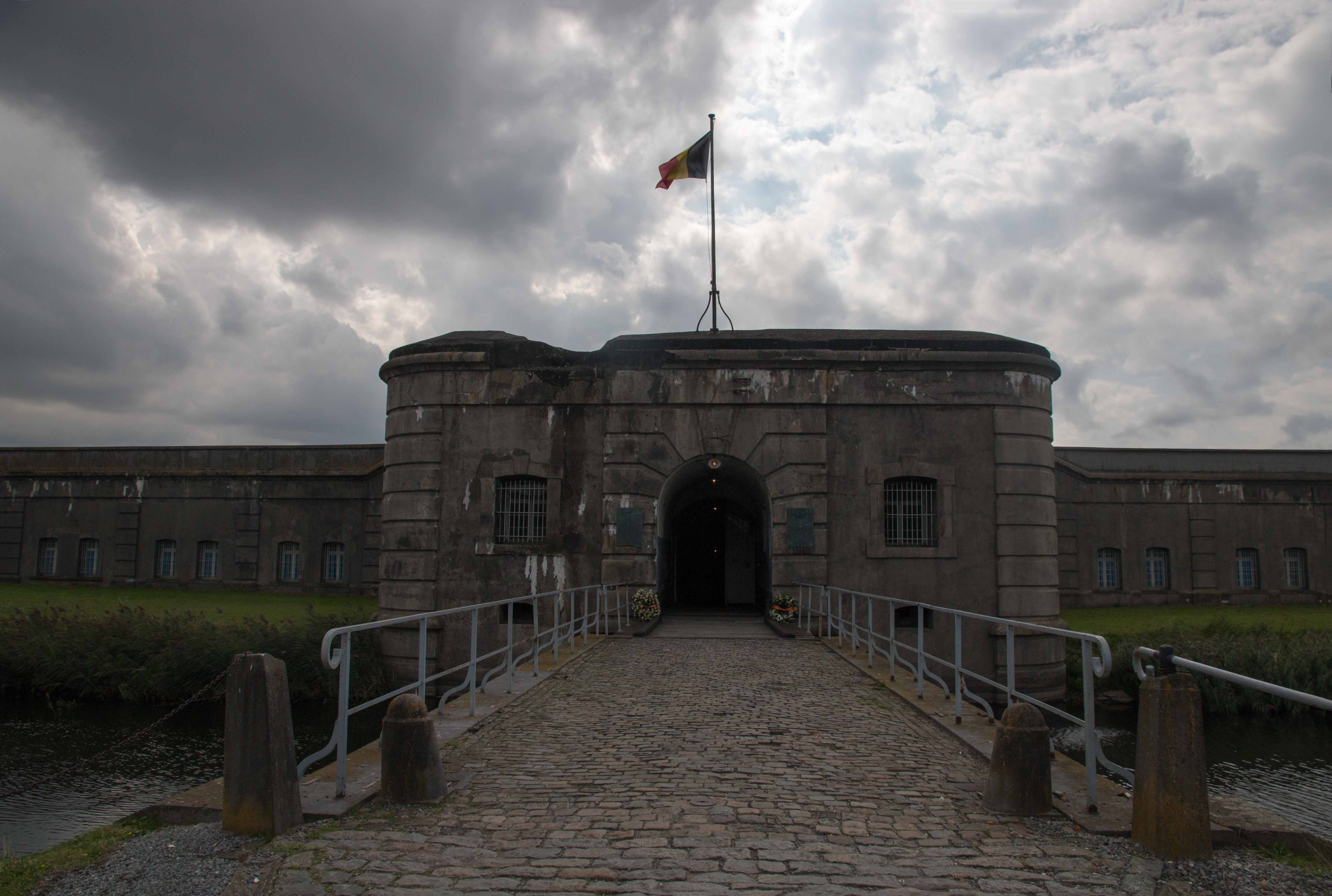
- Established: August 19, 1947
- Location: Belgium
- Type: Memorial Museum
- Owner: War Heritage Institute (Belgium)
- Website: fortbreendonk.be

Breendonk Memorial is a memorial monument with a museum located in Breendonk, Antwerp Province, Belgium. Since 2017 it is part of the War Heritage Institute. The monument is a reminder that Fort Breendonk was the site of a Nazi concentration camp during World War II, and the museum provides information about the historical events that took place there.

== History of Fort Breendonk ==
Fort Breendonk is a fortress built in the early twentieth century as part of a defensive belt surrounding Antwerp. In 1914, at the outbreak of World War I, it is hit head-on when the German army attacks the Antwerp fortress. In August 1940, during the occupation of Belgium in World War II by the Germans, the SS creates an "Auffanglager" in the empty fortress adjacent to the road linking Brussels and Antwerp. It is a prison for Jews, resistance fighters and political opponents of the Nazi regime. Jewish prisoners in Breendonk were segregated from other prisoners until 1942. Thereafter, they were transferred to the Mechelen (Malines) transit camp in Belgium, or deported to the Auschwitz-Birkenau killing center in Nazi-occupied Poland.

== History of the Breendonk Memorial ==
After the liberation of Belgium from the occupation and on the initiative of one of its former prisoners, Gaston Hoyaux, in 1946 the creation of a memorial center is approved, as it is one of the best preserved camps in Europe. In 1947, the Belgian parliament unanimously decided to convert the fort into a national memorial, and the Prince Karel of Belgium signed the law confirming the creation of the National Remembrance Center, making it an autonomous public institution. In 1954, the King inaugurated a memorial to the political opponents of the German occupation in the courtyard of the fortress. The fortress was reopened after a complete renovation in 2003. In September 2021, a new memorial to the victims was inaugurated with a sculpture with the name 'Ode to Resistance' which was designed by artist Tom Fransen and shows a giant boot stepping on women, children and resistance fighters, while a man releases a pigeon.

The goals of the memorial are beyond the remembrance of Fort Breendonk as a concentration camp, so it was also defined as a symbol for the suffering, cruelties, and atrocities in Europe during the Holocaust with an educational function. The connection with this wider scope is reflected in the display of urns holding the ashes of Belgians who did not survive the camps Majdanek, Natzweiler, Neuengamme, Ravensbrück, Stutthof, Treblinka, Theresienstadt, and Vught, which are surrounded by walls displaying the over 3,500 names of all those that were imprisoned in Breendonk. The Breendonk Fort National Memorial also keeps a record of the prisoners in "Auffangslager" that includes 3,720 names.

The total number of yearly visitors is about 100,000, while the fort receives between 60,000 and 65,000 students annually.

== Educational activities ==
Given the educational function of the memorial, while focused on its historical context, it also aims to create understanding into the establishment of a totalitarian ideology, and to draw parallels with contemporary contexts. For this reason the memorial center organizes:

- Seminars in coordination with schools and the organization School Zonder Racism (School without Racism)
- Workshop 'Oogkleppen Alf' (Blinders Off!) to highlight the link between prejudices and racism.

There is also an annual pilgrimage in memory its prisoners, and temporal expositions.

== Tour and artists ==
Given the focus as a pedagogical experience there is an audio tour with sounds that simulates the experience of being in the fort during the times of the Nazi occupation. This supported by the well-preserved facilities and information allows to properly contextualize the simulated experience. It is reported to be a highly emotional experience.

The memorial hosts works of a number of artists like:

- Idel Iancelevici's statue named De Weerstander (The Insurgent), 1954.
- Wilchar (Wilhelm Joseph Pauwels).
- Jacques Ochs
- Didier Geluk
- Tom Frantzen. Sculpture named 'Ode aan het Verzet' (Ode to Resistance). Year 2021.

== Gallery ==
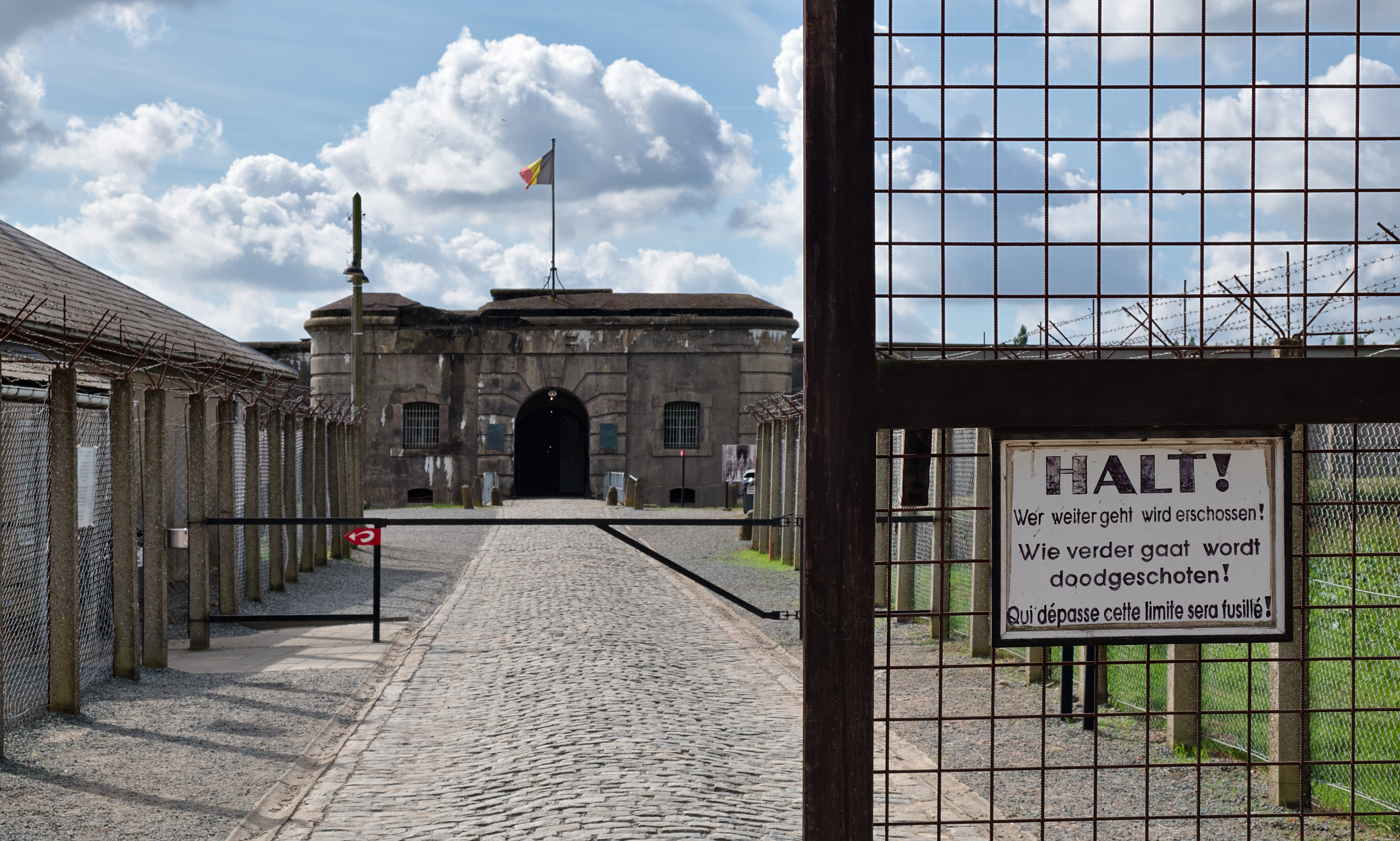
Fort Breendonk Entrance

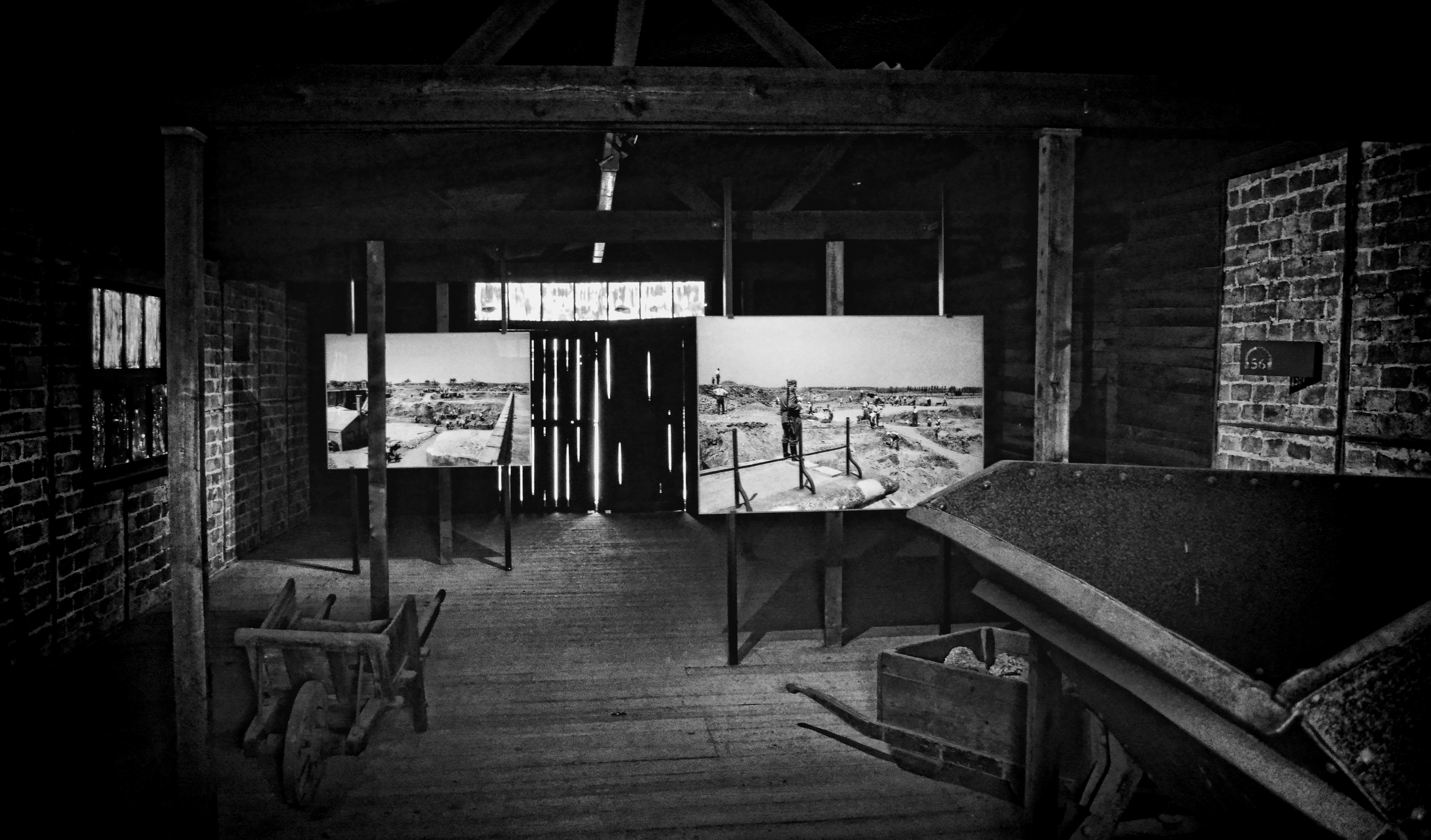
Memorial Fort Breendonk (1)

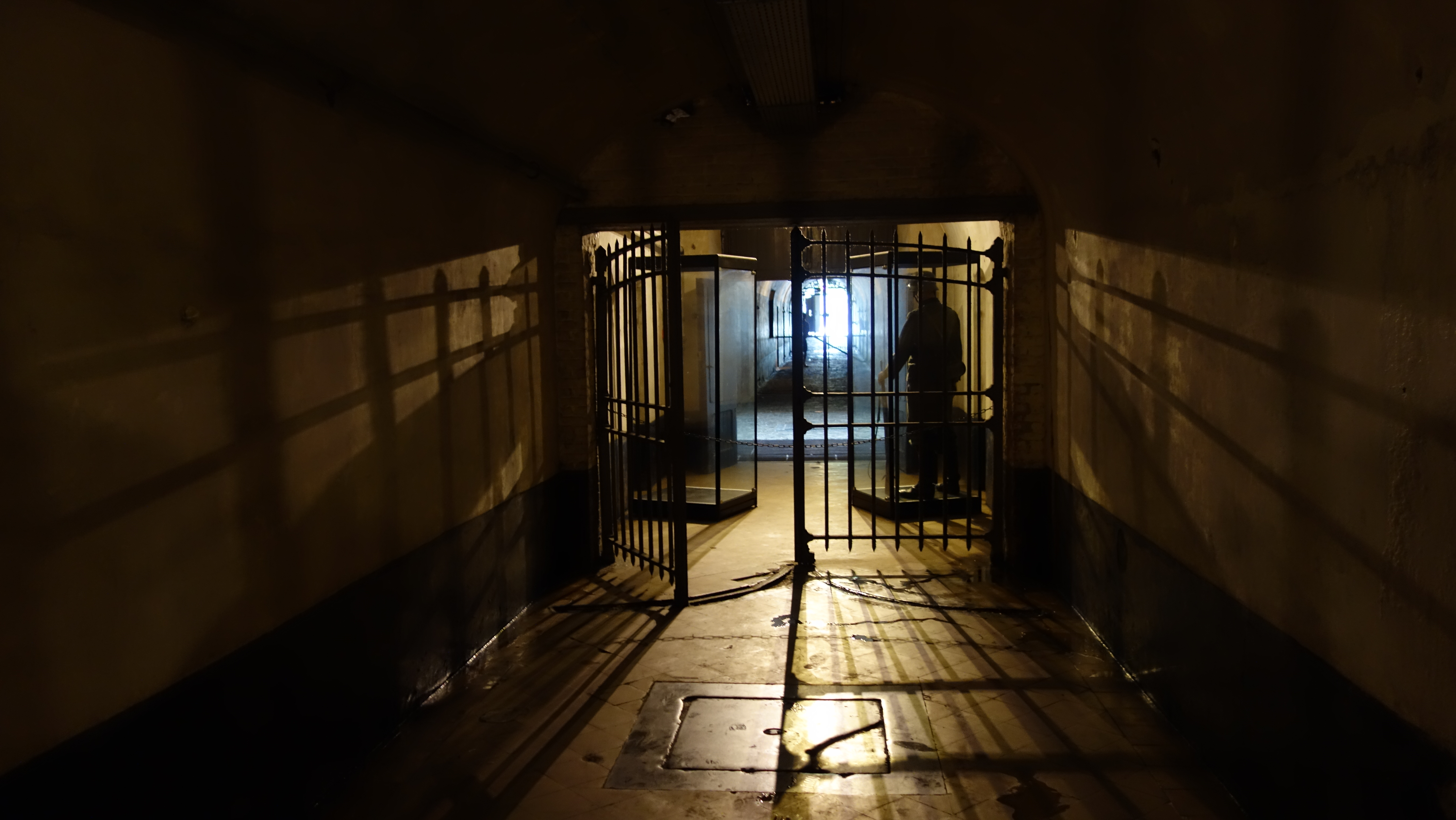
Memorial Fort Breendonk (2)

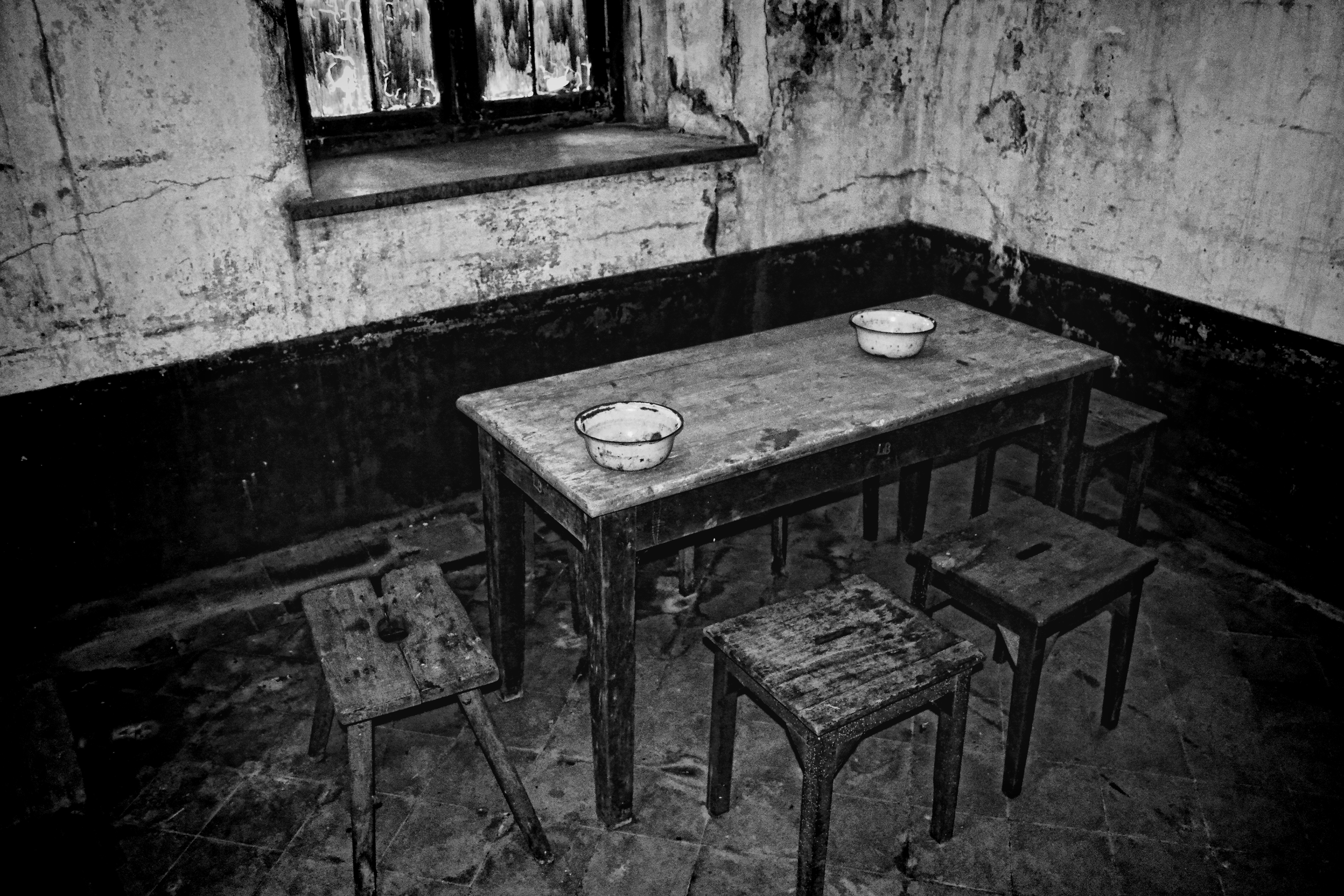
Memorial Frot Breendonk (3)

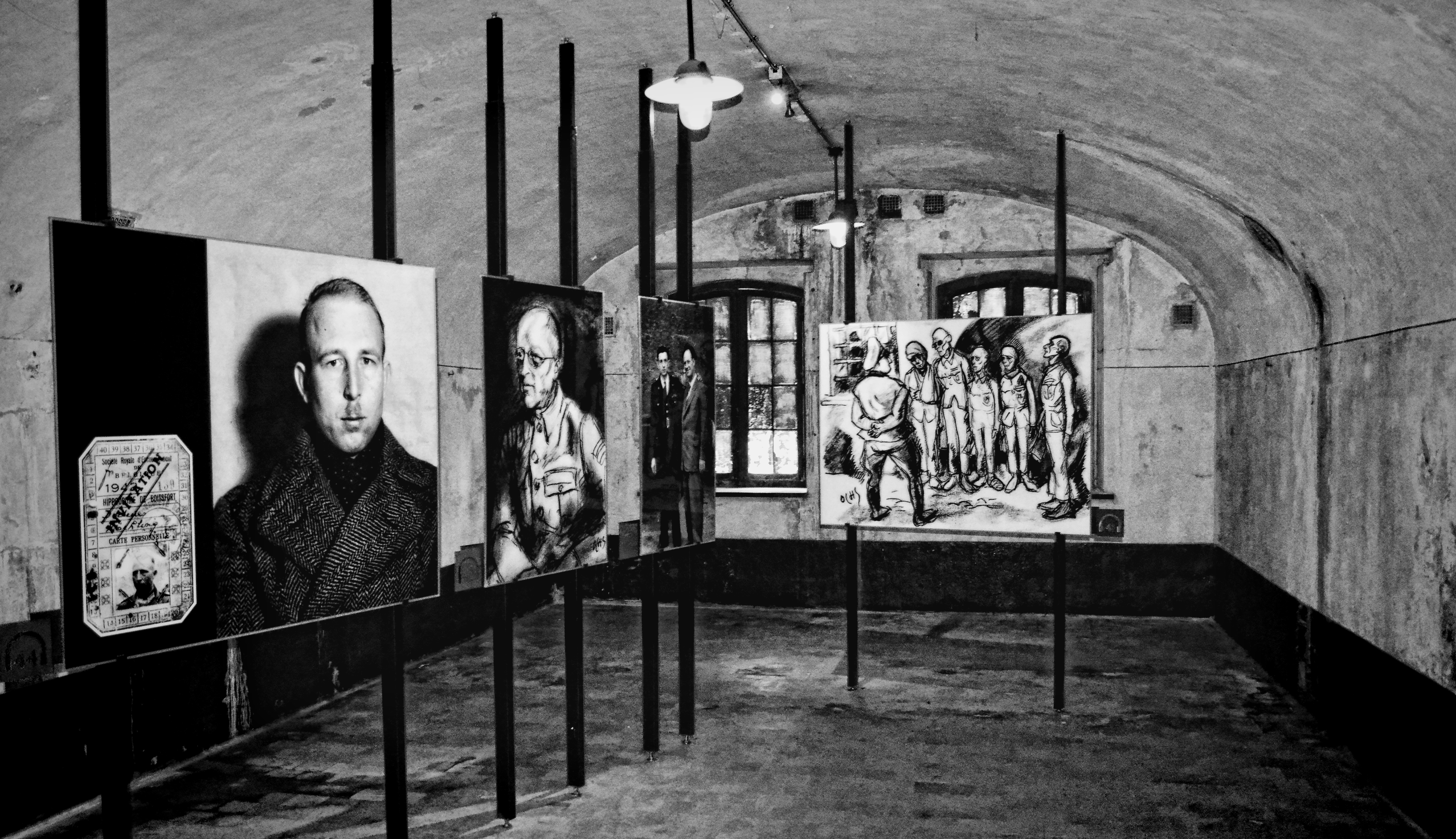
Memorial Fort Breendonk (4)

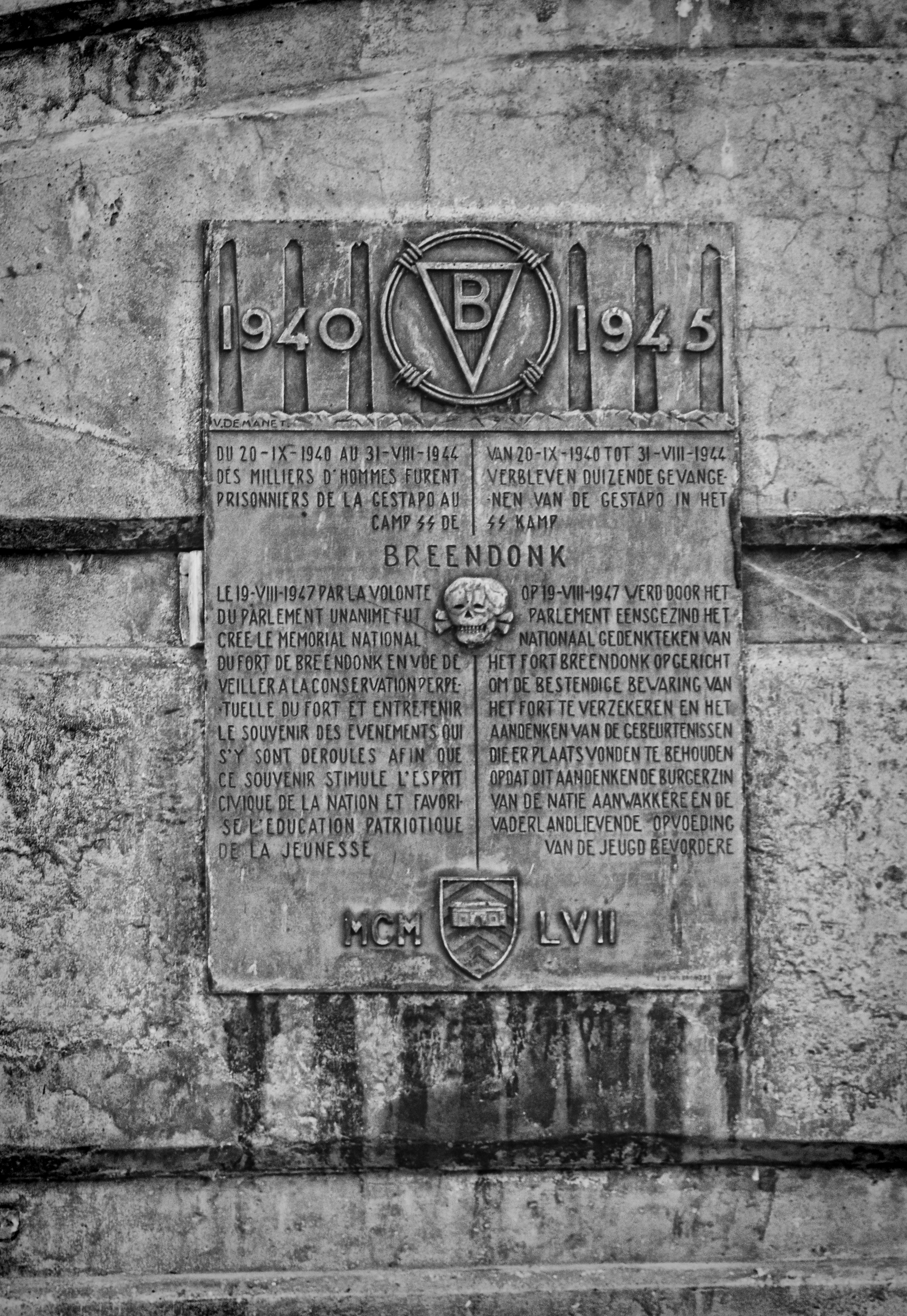
Memorial Fort Breendonk (5)

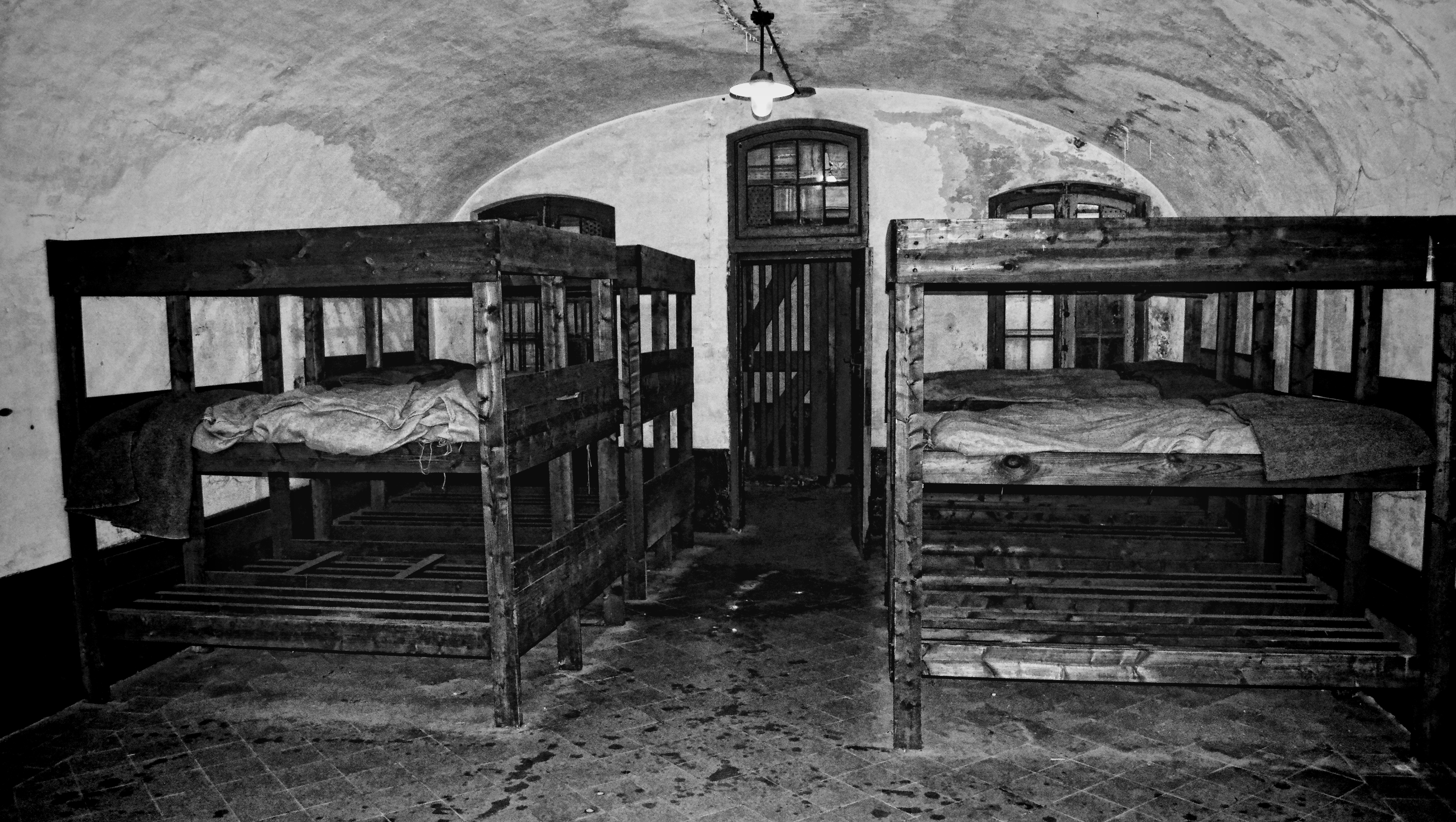
Memorial Fort Breendonk (6)

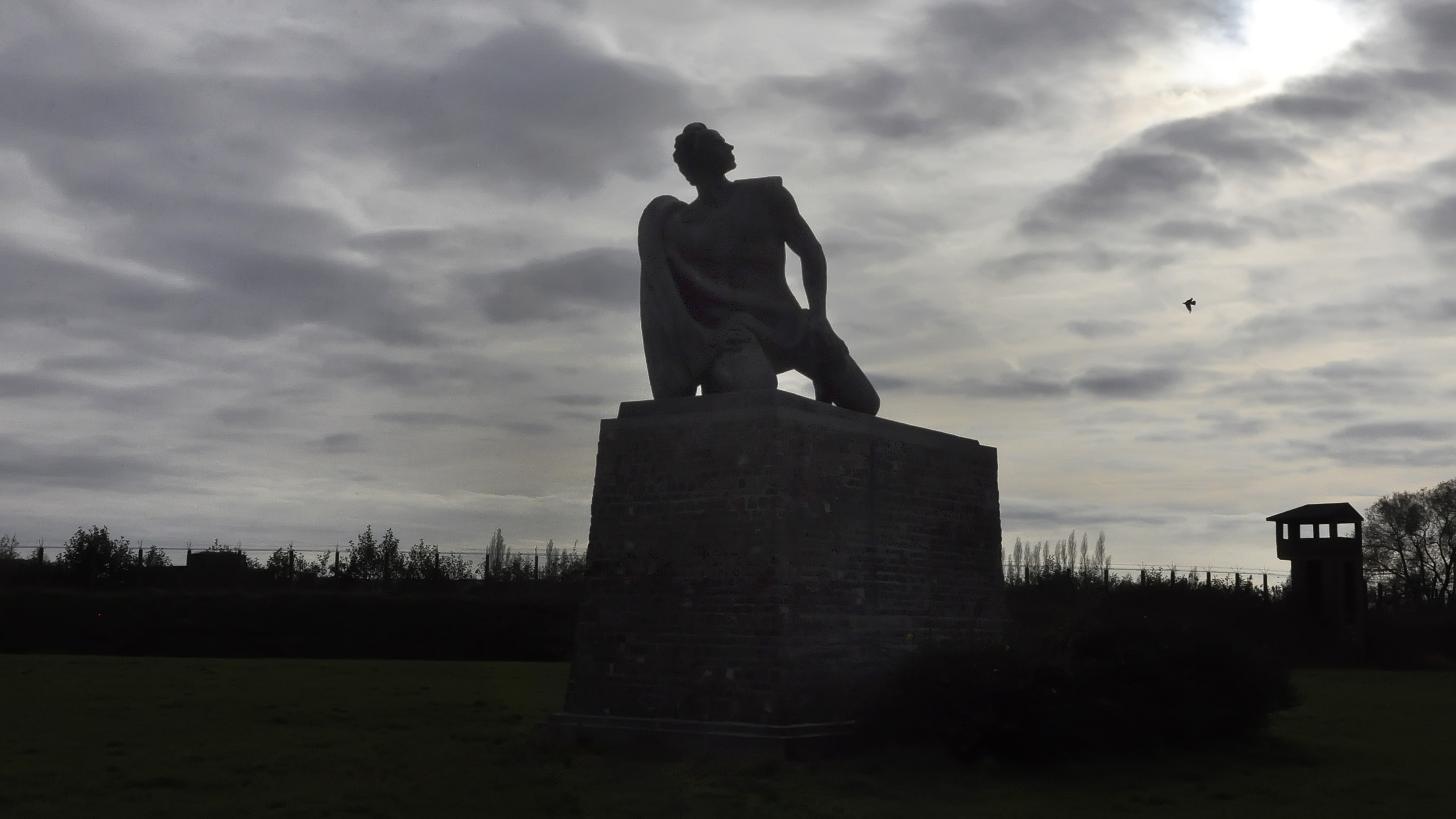
Statue "De Weerstander" of Idel Ianchelevici

== See also ==
- Fort Breendonk
- The Holocaust in Belgium
- Nazi concentration camps
