= Patiens =

Bishop of Metz

Saint Patiens

Bishop of Metz
- Died: IV century
- Venerated in: Roman Catholic Church, Orthodox Church
- Canonized: Pre-congregation
- Feast: 8 January, 12 November
- Patronage: Metz, France

Patiens was the fourth Bishop of Metz, later being made patron of the city. He died in the fourth century.
