= Fulrad =

French religious leader

Saint Fulrad
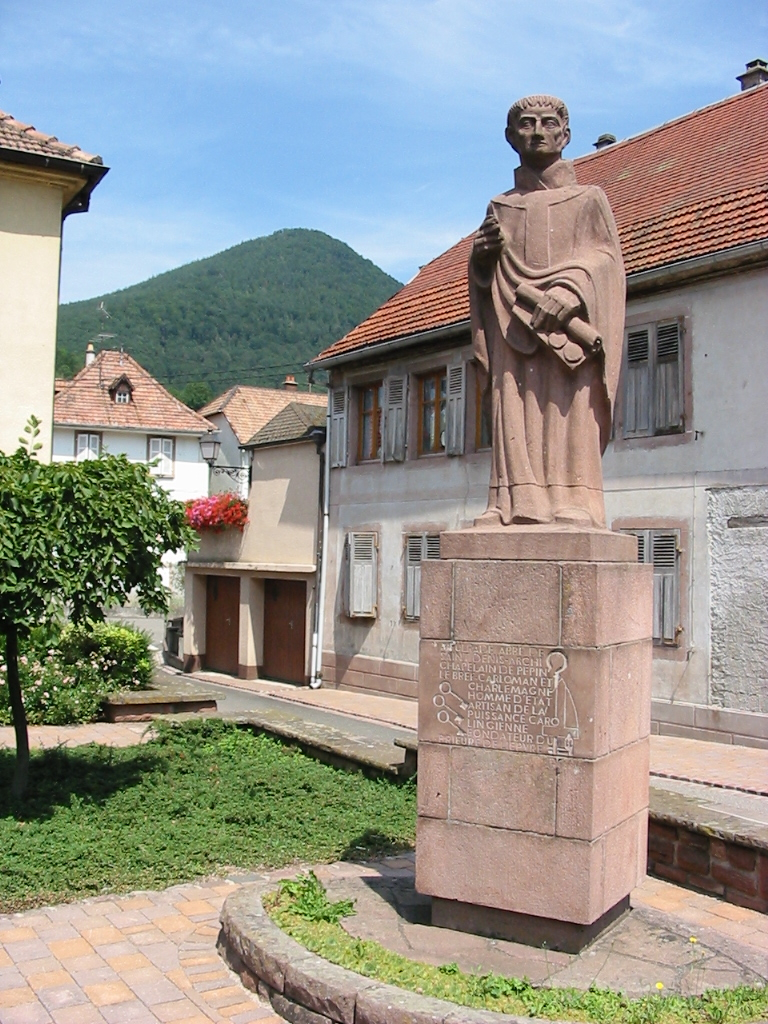
- A statue of Fulrad at Lièpvre

Abbot
- Born: 710; Alsace, Frankish Empire
- Died: 16 July 784
- Venerated in: Eastern Orthodox Church; Roman Catholic Church
- Feast: 16 July

Saint Fulrad (French: Fulrade; Latin: Fulradus; 710 – 16 July 784) was a Frankish religious leader who was the Abbot of Saint-Denis. He was the counselor of both Pepin the Short and Charlemagne. Historians see Fulrad as important due to his significance in the rise of the Frankish Kingdom, and the insight he gives into early Carolingian society. He was noted to have been always on the side of Charlemagne, especially during the attack from the Saxons on Regnum Francorum (Latin for Francia), and the Royal Mandatum (a royal official of the Carolingian administrative hierarchy). Other historians have taken a closer look at Fulrad's interactions with the papacy. When Fulrad was the counselor of Pepin he was closely in contact with the papacy to gain approval for Pepin's appointment as King of the Franks. During his time under Charlemagne, he had dealings with the papacy again for different reasons. When he became Abbot of Saint-Denis in the mid-eighth century, Fulrad became important in the lives of distinct historical figures in various ways. Saint Fulrad's Feast Day is on 16 July.

== Biography ==
In 710 Fulrad was born in Alsace, Francia. He joined the abbey of Saint-Denis, and in 750 he was elected its abbot. With his new position, Fulrad increased the size of the abbey with his inheritance from his parents; as well he retook the land seized from the abbey by Charles Martel. Fulrad took full advantage of his position to increase his “reach as a leader”. Fulrad founded new monasteries and operated them himself in the beginning; the monasteries were located in Alsace-Lorraine and Alemannia. Each monastery had relics, which made them pilgrimage destinations; Fulrad profited from them with the taking some of the money that travelers placed on the collection near the saint's relic; however “as abbot of Saint-Denis, Fulrad’s personal property also belonged to the monastery he led”. With the new monasteries and them being popular pilgrimage destinations, Fulrad asked Pope Stephan II to have a “cloister” bishop in order to provide the pastoral services he was now unable to do at his other monasteries. As abbot, his main priority was to take care and be at the head of Saint-Denis abbey; that is why he was granted the bishop to take care of his other monasteries. With the position Fulrad had, he advised Frankish bishops; and would go on to have a higher role in the church as a “quasi-bishop”. Fulrad never became bishop, but he did climb up the ladder of the ecclesiastical hierarchy, becoming a “capellanus”; he was first Pippin III and then Charlemagne's “arch-Chaplain”; he would later become their counselor. Fulrad had a close relation with the royal family, since he held office under both Pepin III and then Charlemagne. He also had great significance in shaping Western European history. For instance, he motivated the Franks in siding with the Papacy, rather than the Byzantines; this was a strategic diplomatic initiative that would end with Charlemagne becoming the Emperor from 800-14; but Fulrad would not see the result of his actions, as it occurred eleven years after his death in 784.

== Fulrad's Testament ==
Fulrad's Testament (Latin: Fulrad's Testimonium), gives an account of early Carolingian society. In the “testament”, Fulrad presents a survey of certain places and gave a detailed account of the religious, political and economic differences between the towns. Some Historians have seen the importance of Fulrad's account of early Carolingian history; the places he placed under the royal abbey were used as a defense against Eastern Nobility. However, the eastern lands were economically important, and the abbey of Saint-Denis could benefit from expanding into that region. Fulrad's testament is also seen as an important look into the lives of Carolingian characters as he identifies certain people and traces their lineage. This lineage part of the testament was and is considered so important that Alain Stoclet's who wrote “Autour de Fulrad de Saint-Denis (v. 710-784)”, devoted a whole chapter on the “genealogica et prosopographica” of Abbot Fulrad.

== Fulrad and Pippin III ==
Abbot Fulrad was the counselor of Pippin III. The connection between these two figures goes beyond just friendship, but as two strong figures that helped each other and had great respect for each other's service. Historians have written about this friendship, and examples of it are seen in distinctively in certain dealings with the papacy and with Pippin's burial.

=== Dealings with the papacy ===
The reason for this meeting with the papacy was to make clear and make sure that Pippin, and not Childeric should be king of the Franks. Even before this, in 750, Fulrad was a servant of Pippin, being his consular and “Arch-Chaplain”. In that, Pippin III already had respect and trust in Fulrad; thus giving him the “highly important mission” of going to “win over…[pope] [Zachary]” on the matter of “changing government”. The Codex Carolinus, contains a summary of the response of Pope Zachary to Fulrad, which read, “it was better to call the person who has the royal power king rather than he who does not have it”. Pippin in 751 forced Childric to a monastery and made himself king.

=== Pippin’s Charter of 755 ===
According to a papal biographer, with Pepin as King, Pippin III “ordered a charter to be drawn up”. This charter gave all the land of: the Lombard king, donations of St. Peter to all future popes; which included such towns as Ravenna, San Marino, Gubbio and Northern Umbria. Each town welcomed Fulrad, and after this, Fulrad went himself to place the “keys of the ceded cities on the tomb of [St. Peter]…with the official charter…drawn up in Pippin’s name”. The charter is somewhat unclear—according to church writings of Pope Stephen II—however, the papacy did profit for the supposed vague charter that gave Fulrad these regions: Ravenna, Cesena, Comacchio, Fano, Pesaro, San Marino, Forlimpopoli, Urbino, and Montefeltro. By the time this all occurred Pippin had left Italy, feeling confident and with a clear conscience since the town were under Fulrad's care, so the papacy would be able to “take care of itself”.

=== Burial of Pippin III ===
Abbot Fulrad had such an impact on Pepin III, that the latter's final wishes and resting place were all connected to Fulrad and his abbey of Saint-Denis. Pippin became very ill at his campaign of Aquitaine in the city of Saintes. He traveled to Saint-Denis where he would be buried. Pippin, at his own request asked to be buried at Saint-Denis next to the saint; also he wanted to be buried at the abbey where Fulrad, his Arch-Chaplin and “one of his staunchest political [allies]” was the Abbot.

== Fulrad and Charlemagne ==
Fulrad was also the Arch-Chaplin and Counselor to Charlemagne. He was at the side or of great help for Charlemagne with Regnum Francorum (Latin for Francia), war with the Saxons, dealing with the papacy with Charlemagne's promise of a “Donation” [and] royal Mandatum”, and with the exchange with Pope Hadrian.

=== “Regnum Francorum” ===
Charlemagne awarded the “estates in Alsace and Alemannia” to the abbey of Saint-Denis; Fulrad already had expanded the interest of Saint-Denis in these areas. Charlemagne gave Fulrad's abbey many riches and more land—the “valuable royal villa of Herbrechtingen”; and built up the area of the abbey in order to support armies on campaign. This was Charlemagne's way of not having to rely solely on the loyalty of local officials, as Charlemagne could rely above all on Fulrad, his personal arch-chaplain and counselor.

=== Fulrad and the papacy ===
==== Missus, “‘Donation’ [and] ‘Royal Mandatum’” ====
In the “Donation”, the pope declared that there would be a Missus, someone who would deal with the problems that the pope had identified in his letters in the Donation. In the letter, the pope stated that Charlemagne promised to dispatch someone with a “Royal Mandatum” to act with the power of the king in Italy. As Fulrad was the Carolingian most senior expert on Italian matters, as one-historian notes, the abbot of Saint-Denis became the Missus, however Fulrad was still the Abbot of Saint-Denis at this time.

==== Fulrad and the exchange between Charlemagne and Pope Hadrian ====
Fulrad was at the side of Charlemagne from the beginning to the end of this exchange as his adviser. From autumn 774 through the summer of 775, Fulrad stayed and supported Charlemagne at court until Charlemagne left to invade Saxony in the summer of 775. During his time at the courts, Charlemagne authorized many charters in favor of Fulrad's abbey of Saint-Denis. The charters were granted because Fulrad successfully guiding Carolingian policy in Italian affairs; however it is to be “understood as [an] illustrative of royal policies involving the monastery of Saint-Denis as a major cog in Charlemagne’s kingdom-side administration”.

== Francia ==
Fulrad is viewed as the figure that truly helped develop the growing kingdom of Francia. One historian notes that Fulrad was one of the few “Neustrian figures”, to come and support the cause and be in the service of the new rising dynasty. The monastery of Saint-Denis, which Fulrad was the abbot, became a burial place for Carolingian monarchy; Abbot Fulrad's Monastery of Saint-Denis became the “royal mausoleum” of the Frankish kings. Abbot Fulrad and the First Carolingian kings destroyed “the Merovingian church of Saint-Denis. Fulrad and the Carolingian kings would build a basilica, helping to aerate the “first actual Carolingian church”.

== New Basilica of Saint-Denis ==
Abbot Fulrad oversaw the new construction of the basilica of Saint-Denis. Construction began in 754 and was completed under Charlemagne, who was present at its consecration in 775. Much of what is now known about the Carolingian church at St Denis resulted from a lengthy series of excavations begun under the American art historian Sumner McKnight Crosby in 1937. The structure was about eighty meters long, with an imposing facade, a nave divided into three sections by two rows of marble columns, a transept, and apse at the east end. Fulrad's church had smaller elements such as arches and transepts, it did however have classical elements had its design, strong Byzantine influence and metal work throughout the Basilica. During important religious celebrations, the interior of the church was lit with 1250 lamps.

This same basilica is where many of the Merovingian and the Carolingian monarchs were buried in the crypts. In 1137, Abbot Suger (1081-1155) commissioned to have the old Church of Fulrad rebuilt. He believed the old design from 775 “ would have been viewed with extreme suspicion by a…building inspector”. The new church was completed in 1144 demonstrating a major architectural achievement; “Gothic was born”.

== Death and successors ==
Abbot Fulrad died on 16 July 784. When Fulrad died, Charlemagne chose Angilram, the bishop of Metz and Hildebald of Cologne to be the new abbots of Saint-Denis to carry on the work of abbot Fulrad.
