= Luciferians (Christian faction) =

4th-century Christian faction

The Luciferians were a Christian faction in the latter half of the 4th century. They were named by their opponents after Bishop Lucifer of Cagliari, known for his strong opposition to Arianism in the 350s, but they rejected the label. Scholars often still employ it for convenience.

The Luciferians refused communion with Arians, Nicene clergy who communed with Arians and ones they called "prevaricators" (praevaricatores), that is, Arian converts to Nicene Christology. In 383 or 384, the Luciferian presbyters Faustinus and Marcellinus travelled to Constantinople to petition Emperor Theodosius I for recognition of the Luciferians as the true church, although they were willing to settle for imperial protection from persecution. Their petition, Libellus precum, survives as an important statement of Luciferian belief. Theodosius granted their latter request in a rescript, Lex augusta, addressed to Maternus Cynegius.

Two other works by Faustinus are known: his statement of faith, Confessio fidei, addressed to Theodosius I, and a doctrinal treatise on the Trinity, De Trinitate, addressed to the Empress Flaccilla. The Luciferians also produced two forged letters purporting to be from Athanasius to Lucifer. They are letters 50 and 51 in the standard collection of Athanasius' letters. No Luciferian works are known that can be dated later than the 380s. Around 400, Rufinus stated that there were only a few Luciferians left but they were in schism.

Jerome wrote a "dialogue against the Luciferians", Dialogus adversus Luciferianos, one of his early works. The Luciferians were remembered as a rigorist sect in the 9th century, when Saul of Córdoba lumped them together with the Donatists and the Migetians.

The Libellus precum, Lex augusta, Confessio fidei, De Trinitate and the two Pseudo-Athanasian epistles have been translated into English and published in a single volume.

== Bibliography ==
- Cavadini, John C. (1993). The Last Christology of the West: Adoptionism in Spain and Gaul, 785–820. University of Pennsylvania Press. doi:10.9783/9781512801149.
- Pérez Mas, Javier (2008). La crisis luciferiana: Un intento de reconstrucción histórica. Institutum Patristicum Augustinianum.
- Whiting, Colin M., ed. (2019). Documents from the Luciferians: In Defense of the Nicene Creed. SBL Press.
