= Angilram (bishop of Metz) =

Angilram or Angilramn (died October 791) was a Frankish prelate. He served as the bishop of Metz from 768 until 791 and as the royal archchaplain under Charlemagne from 784 until 791.

Angilram had a papal dispensation allowing him to remain permanently at court as a confessor and advisor. He frequently accompanied the king on his military campaigns. By 788, he had received the honorary personal title of archbishop. He also served concurrently as abbot of Chiemsee, Senones and Sint-Truiden.

Photograph of the first page of the second half of Angilram's bible before it was lost in 1944

Angilram had an interest in historiography and liturgy. He commissioned Paul the Deacon to write a history of the diocese of Metz and may have had a role in the production of the Royal Frankish Annals. He also added three paragraphs to the Rule of Chrodegang, including adding the celebration of the Octave of Pentecost. The oldest version of the Ordines Romani has also been attributed to Angilram. He commissioned the first single-volume Bible of the Carolingian Renaissance, but it was lost in 1944.

== Life ==
Of noble Austrasian stock, Angilram succeeded Chrodegang as bishop of Metz. According to local tradition, he was a nephew of Chrodegang, being the son of his brother, perhaps the same brother who was the father of Duke Ingerman. He was elected in 768 after a two-year vacancy. He was consecrated on 25 September 768. He attended the Paderborn assembly in 777.

From at least 781, Angilram is one the figures from Charlemagne's intimate circle who appears most frequently in contemporary documentation. Charlemagne procured for him a papal dispensation from the obligation to reside in Metz, allowing him to remain permanently at court. His special status may have aroused jealousy among the other bishops of Francia.

In 784, Angilram succeeded Fulrad as archchaplain with responsibility for all the clergy of the royal court and for overseeing the services of the chapel. He may have been exercising the office de facto since 780. As archchaplain, he was also the king's confessor and accompanied him on his military campaigns. As an advisor, however, he never equalled Fulrad influence, being overshadowed by Alcuin of York. By 788, however, Charlemagne had obtained for him the title of archbishop. The diocese of Metz, however, was not elevated. Angilram was an archbishop only "of the holy palace".

In 788, Angilram accompanied Charlemagne to Regensburg. On 25 October, after the deposition of Duke Tassilo III of Bavaria, he received on behalf of the diocese of Metz the Bavarian monastery of Chiemsee from the king. Angilram thus became abbot of Chiemsee, as he was also of Senones and Sint-Truiden. As bishop, he consecrated the church of Lorsch Abbey.

Angilram accompanied the king on the Avar campaign of 791. At Regensburg, at the king's request, he prepared a collection of royal correspondence, now known as the Codex epistolaris Carolinus. He died on the return journey on 26 October 791, perhaps as a result of the stresses of the campaign. Some sources give a date of 23 or 25 October. Alcuin of York wrote his epitaph.

The diocese of Metz remained vacant for decades after Angilram's death, its properties controlled by the king until Charlemagne's illegitimate son Drogo became bishop. Walter Goffart speculates that it was intended that Charlemagne's son Pippin the Hunchback succeed Angilram, but the latter rebelled in 792, spoiling the planned succession. As archchaplain, Angilram was succeeded by Bishop Hildebold of Cologne. In 794, Charlemagne received permission for Hildebold to reside permanently at court, as Angilram had done.

== Works ==
A page from the Rule of Chrodegang in Bern, Burgerbibliothek, MS 289, folio 11r, copied at Metz under Angirlam

In the early 780s, Angilram commissioned Paul the Deacon to write a history of the diocese of Metz and supplied him with the necessary materials. The Deeds of the Bishops of Metz was completed by 784. Paul ends the work by noting how Angilram's biography would be added to it in the future. In his History of the Lombards, he calls Angilram "a very gentle man and distinguished by holiness". The Versus de episcopis Mettensibus, a poem on the bishops of Metz, either used by Paul or was based on him, was probably commissioned by Angilram. The Deeds of the Bishops was never in fact expanded beyond its original scope. Goffart argues that the Deeds is mainly "a statement of political ideas, a memorandum of the views ... current in Charlemagne's capella on the eve of Angilram's becoming its head" and that history "was secondary to the apologetic ... designs of ... the court bishop". Angilram has also been considered a candidate for author or initiator of the Royal Frankish Annals. He may have written the circular letter De litteris colendis on behalf of Charlemagne.

Angilram produced a corrected edition of the Vulgate Bible. This was the earliest known Carolingian pandect or single-volume Bible, preceding the projects of Alcuin of York and Theodulf of Orléans. Only the second part survived into the 20th century, containing the text from Proverbs to Revelation 12:13, save the catholic epistles. It was lost to destruction in 1944 but photographs survive. The text of the Angilram Bible was unique, although it was later corrected based on the Tours Bible of Alcuin. The Bible measured 46 by 33 centimetres (18 in × 13 in) with text in two columns of forty lines per page. It contained besides the canonical books, at least Psalm 151, Judith, Tobit, Wisdom and Maccabees.

Arthur Westwell has attributed the original form of the Ordines Romani collection to Angilram. It contained just four orders (ordines), those numbered 1, 11, 27 and 34 in the fuller Collection A (or Roman Collection). One manuscript of Collection A, now London, British Library, Add, MS 15222, contains a rule attributed to Angilram specifying the honoraria paid to clergy for certain liturgical services. The Late Latin of his short rule has Romance features. Angilram also added three paragraphs to the Rule of Chrodegang composed by his predecessor at chapters 20, 33 and 34. He introduced the celebration of the Octave of Pentecost and permitted the eating of meat:

And I, Angilramn, Archbishop and Chaplain to the most excellent King Charles, am pleased to add that while we and our clergy are celebrating with devotion the time from Pentecost to its Octave, which is the second Pasch, the coming of the Holy Spirit, on these eight most holy days the clergy of St Stephen the Protomartyr, being our own, may have permission to eat meat, except for those who have decided to abstain for the good of their souls, or because penance has been laid on them.

The most famous work attributed to Angilram is not actually by him. The Capitula Angilramni is a Pseudo-Isidorian forgery claiming to be a collection of canon law given by Angilram to Pope Hadrian I in 786.

== Bibliography ==
- Andrieu, Michel (1930). "Règlement d'Angilramne de Metz (768—793) fixant les honoraires de quelques fonctions liturgiques". Revue des sciences religieuses. 10 (3): 349–369.
- Barbero, Alessandro (2004) [2000]. Charlemagne: Father of a Continent. Translated by Allan Cameron. University of California Press.
- Bertram, Jerome (2005). The Chrodegang Rules: The Rules for the Common Life of the Secular Clergy from the Eighth and Ninth Centuries. Critical Texts with Translations and Commentary. Ashgate.
- Bogaert, Pierre-Maurice (1969). "A propos de deux bibles messines: Les manuscrits de Metz 1 et Paris B. N., lat. 78". Revue bénédictine. 79 (3–4): 436–443. doi:10.1484/J.RB.4.00685.
- Boodts, Shari (2023). "The Bible in the Carolingian Age". In H. A. G. Houghton (ed.). The Oxford Handbook of the Latin Bible. pp. 169–186.
- Bühler, Johannes (1953). "Angilram". Neue Deutsche Biographie. Vol. 1. p. 294.
- Chevalier-Royet, Caroline (2006). "Les révisions bibliques carolingiennes". Temas medievales. 14: 7–29.
- Claussen, Martin A. (2004). The Reform of the Frankish Church: Chrodegang of Metz and the Regula canonicorum in the Eighth Century. Cambridge University Press.
- Collins, Roger (1998). Charlemagne. Macmillan.
- Fried, Johannes (2016) [2013]. Charlemagne. Translated by Peter Lewis. Harvard University Press.
- Goffart, Walter (1986). "Paul the Deacon's Gesta Episcoporum Mettensium and the Early Design of Charlemagne's Succession". Traditio. 42: 59–93.
- Goldberg, Eric J. (2010). "Angilram of Metz". In Robert E. Bjork (ed.). The Oxford Dictionary of the Middle Ages. Oxford University Press.
- Hägermann, Dieter (2011) [2000]. Carlo Magno: Il signore dell'Occidente. Translated by Giuseppe Albertoni. Arnoldo Mondadori Editore.
- Kempf, Damien (2004). "Paul the Deacon's Liber de episcopis Mettensibus and the Role of Metz in the Carolingian Realm". Journal of Medieval History. 30 (3): 279–299.
- McKitterick, Rosamond (1983). The Frankish Kingdoms under the Carolingians, 751–987. London: Longman.
- McKitterick, Rosamond (2008). Charlemagne: The Formation of a European Identity. Cambridge University Press.
- Minois, Georges (2014). Charlemagne. Perrin.
- Nelson, Janet L. (2019). King and Emperor: A New Life of Charlemagne. Penguin.
- Westwell, Arthur (2024). Roman Liturgy and Frankish Creativity: The Early Medieval Manuscripts of the Ordines Romani. Cambridge University Press.
