= List of bishops of Metz =

Bishops who have served in diocese in eastern France

This is a list of bishops of the Roman Catholic diocese of Metz, which now lies in eastern France.

== To 500 ==
- Clement of Metz (c. 280–300)
- Celestius
- Felix I
- Patient
- Victor I 344–346
- Victor II
- Simeon
- Sambace
- Rufus of Metz
- Adelphus
- Firmin
- Legonce
- Auctor c. 451
- Explèce (Expletius)
- Urbice of Metz
- Bonole
- Terence
- Consolin
- Romanus c. 486
- Phronimius to 497
- Grammatius 497?–512

== From 500 to 1000 ==
- Agatimber 512?–535
- Hesperius 525–542
- Villicus 542–568
- Peter 568?–578
- Aigulf or Agilulf 590 or 591–601
- Gondulf 591-??? (he was probably only a chorbishop).
- Arnoald or Arnual or Arnoldus 601–609 or 611
- Pappolus 609?–614
- Arnulf 614–629 (Arnulfing)
- Goericus 629–644
- Godo 641?–652?
- Chlodulf, son of Arnulf, 652?–693? (Arnulfing)
- Albo 696–707
- Aptatus 707-715
- Felix II 715–716
- Sigibald 716–741
- Chrodegang 742–766
- Angilram 768–791
- Gundulf 819 to 7 September 822
- Drogo 823–8 December 855
- Adventius 858 to 31 August 875
- Wala 876 to 12 April 882
- Robert I 883 to 2 January 916
- Wigerich 917 to 19 February 927
- Benno of Einsiedeln 927–929
- Adalbero I of Bar 929 to 26 April 962
- Dietrich I 964 to 7 September 984
- Adalbero II of Upper Lorraine 984 to 14 December 1005

== Prince-bishops (c. 1000 to 1648) ==
- Dietrich II of Luxembourg 1006 to 30 April 1047
- Adalbero III of Luxembourg 1047 to 13 November 1072
- Hermann 1073 to 4 May 1090
  - Walo 1085, imperial anti-bishop in opposition to Hermann
  - Bruno of Calw 1085–1088, imperial anti-bishop in opposition to Hermann
- Bouchard 1090
- Poppo of Luxembourg 1090–1103
- Adalbero IV 1090–1117
- Theoger of Saint George 1118 to 29 April 1120
- Etienne de Bar 1120 to 29 December 1163
- Dietrich III of Bar 1164 to 8 August 1171
- Hugo of Clermont 1171
- Friedrich of Pluyvoise 1171–1173
- Dietrich IV of Lorraine 1173–1179
- Bertram 1180 to 6 April 1212 (1178-1179 archbishop of Bremen)
- Conrad III of Scharfenberg 1212 to 24 March 1224
- Johann of Aspremont 1224 to 10 December 1238
- Jacob of Lorraine 1239 to 24 October 1260
- Philip of Lorraine-Florenges 1261–1264
- Wilhelm of Traisnel 1264 to 4 January 1269
- Lorenz of Leistenberg 1270–1279
- John of Flanders 1280 to 31 October 1282
- Burkhard of Avesnes-Hennegau 1282 to 29 November 1296
- Gerhard of Rehlingen 1297 to 30 June 1302
- Reginald of Bar 1302–1316
- Henri, Dauphin of Viennois 1316 to 24 November 1324
- Louis of Poitiers-Valentinois 1325–1327
- Ademar of Monteil 1327 to 12 May 1361
- Johann III of Vienne 1361–1365
- Dietrich V Bayer of Boppard 1365 to 18 January 1384
- Peter of Luxembourg 1384 to 2 July 1387
- Rudolf of Coucy 1388–1415
- Conrad II Bayer of Boppard 1416 to 20 April 1459
- George of Baden 1459 to 11 October 1484
- Henri of Lorraine-Vaudemont 1484 to 28 October 1505
- John, Cardinal of Lorraine 1505–1543
- Nicholas, Duke of Mercœur 1543–1548
- John, Cardinal of Lorraine 1548 to 19 May 1550
- Charles, Cardinal of Lorraine 1550 to 18 May 1551
- Robert de Lenoncourt 1551 to 25 September 1553
- François Beaucaire de Péguillon 1555–1568
- Louis I, Cardinal of Guise 1568 to 28 March 1578
- Charles III de Lorraine-Vaudémont 1578 to 24 November 1607
- Anne d'Escars de Givry 1608 to 19 April 1612
- Henri de Bourbon, duc de Verneuil 1612–1652

== 1652–present ==
- Jules Mazarin 1652–1658
- Franz Egon of Fürstenberg 1658–1663
- Wilhelm Egon von Fürstenberg 1663–1668
- Georges d'Aubusson de la Feuillade 1669–1697
- Henri Charles du Cambout de Coislin 1697–1732
- Claude-Charles de Rouvroy 1733–1760
- Louis-Jean de Montmorency-Laval 1760–1802
  - Nicolas Francin 1792–1802 (constitutional bishop, illegitimate)
- Pierre-François Bienaymé 1802–1806
- Gaspard-André Jauffret 1806–1823
- Jacques-François Besson 1824–1842
- Paul Dupont des Loges 1843–1886
- François Fleck 1886–1899
- Willibrord Benzler 1901–1919
- Jean-Baptiste Pelt 1919–1937
- Joseph-Jean Heintz 1938–1958
- Paul-Joseph Schmitt 1958–1987
- Pierre Raffin 1987–2013
- Jean-Christophe Lagleize 2013–2021
- Philippe Ballot 2022– present
