= Archchaplain =

Cleric with a senior position in the Frankish royal court during the Carolingian period

An Archchaplain was a cleric with a senior position in a royal court. The title was used primarily in the Frankish kingdom in the Carolingian period.

== Holy Roman Archchaplains ==
- Willigis (c982-c1007)
- Erkanbald (c1016-c1020)
- Aribo (c1023-c1028)
- Willegis (c1073)
