= Neuvy-sur-Loire =

- Commune
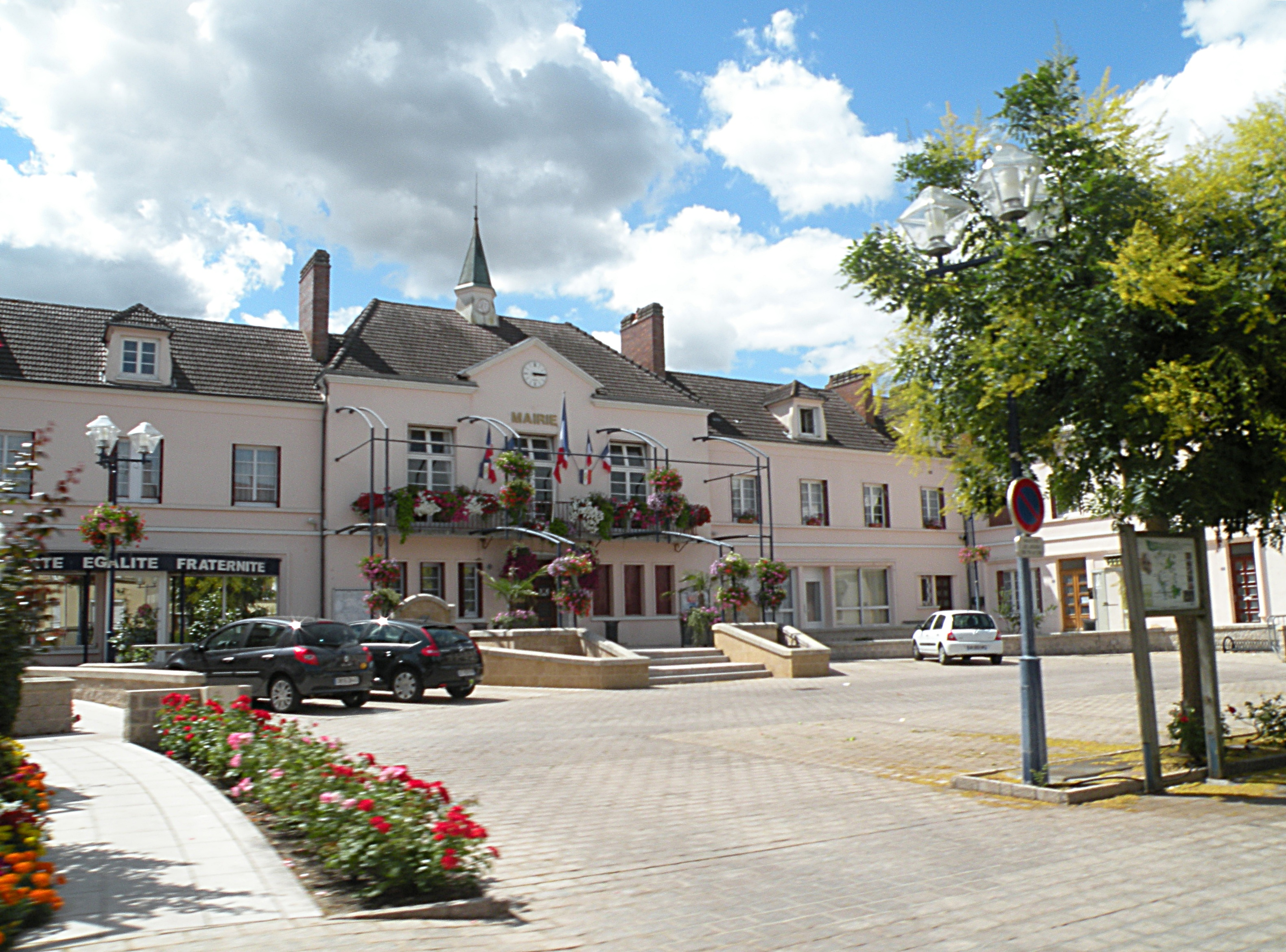
- The town hall in Neuvy-sur-Loire

- Coat of arms
- Location of Neuvy-sur-Loire
- Location within France Location within Bourgogne-Franche-Comté
- Coordinates: 47°31′23″N 2°52′57″E
- Country: France
- Region: Bourgogne-Franche-Comté
- Department: Nièvre
- Arrondissement: Cosne-Cours-sur-Loire
- Canton: Pouilly-sur-Loire

Government
  - Mayor (2020–2026): Patrick Bondeux
- Area^{1}: 21.31 km^{2} (8.23 sq mi)
- Highest elevation: 186 m (610 ft)
- Lowest elevation: 132 m (433 ft)
- Population (2023): 1,445
  - Density: 67.81/km^{2} (175.6/sq mi)
- Time zone: UTC+01:00 (CET)
  - Summer (DST): UTC+02:00 (CEST)
- INSEE/Postal code: 58193 /58450
- ^{1} French Land Register data, which excludes lakes, ponds, glaciers > 1 km^{2} (0.386 sq mi or 247 acres) and river estuaries.

Neuvy-sur-Loire (French pronunciation: [nøvi syʁ lwaʁ], literally Neuvy on Loire) is a commune in the Nièvre department in central France.

== See also ==
- Communes of the Nièvre department
