= Codex epistolaris Carolinus =

The Codex epistolaris Carolinus is a collection of 99 letters from reigning popes to Carolingian rulers written between 739 and 791.

== Background ==
The letters were sent during the pontificates of Gregory III, Zacharias I, Stephen II, Paul I, Stephen III and Hadrian I, with two letters at the end of the collection from the antipope Constantine. The majority of letters are addressed to Charles Martel (r.715–741), Pippin the Younger (r.751–768), Carloman (r.768–772) and Charlemagne (r.768–814). The subjects of the letters are broad, including the papacy's requests for assistance against encroaching Lombards, letters concerning canon law, and affection in the form of parallels being drawn between Carolingians and Old Testament kings. This collection is only preserved in the ninth century-manuscript, the Codex Vindobonensis, and is under the signature of 449 in the Austrian National Library. An English translation was published in 2021.

The preface, or "Praefatio", of the collection states that the letters were compiled as the original parchment detailing the correspondence had been "partly destroyed and erased" by "great age and carelessness". Charlemagne, in 791, therefore ordered that these letters be copied and compiled so that the "wisdom of the ancients" would not be lost. The compilation was put together at a time that saw much religious reform within the Carolingian court. 789 saw the issue of the Admonitio generalis, a capitulation concerned with ensuring authentic Christian teaching, and in 794 the Council of Frankfurt was held in response to the growing heresy of the Adoptionist movement and the questionable decisions of the Second Council of Nicaea of 787. Historian Dorine van Espelo believes that the compiling of letters to form the Codex Carolinus is representative of this religious reform and Charlemagne's commitment to orthodoxy and the Catholic Church, as letters from the papacy would contain religious instruction directly from the most authoritative and orthodox Catholic source. The Codex being formed in a time when the Frankish Court was concerned with Christian orthodoxy explains why the collection includes three letters sent from pope Hadrian to Spanish bishops in response to the growing Adoptionist heresy.

=== "de imperio" debate ===
The preface provides details as to why the letters were collected and who they were sent by. The preface states that the letters were sent by the "highest Apostolic See of the blessed Peter prince of the Apostles" whilst other letters came from "the imperium". This mention of imperium has led to much scholarly debate as letters from the imperium seem to be missing from the collection. The debate inherently concerns Codex Vindobonensis as it is the only manuscript that contains the collection. As the Codex Vindobonensis is a late ninth-century source and the Codex Carolinus contained within is from the late eighth century, the 99 letters are copies of letters collected in 791. With this in mind, some scholars believe it is possible that letters from the imperium have been left out of the collection as encountered in Codex Vindobonensis, either intentionally or because those letters were lost. This interpretation is based on the assumption that imperium refers to the Byzantine Empire. Espelo has pointed to the fluid definition of the term and what it refers to, and has suggested that the term may actually refer to the imperial rule of the Carolingians, thus meaning no letters have been left out. In the letters from 754 onward, the Carolingian leaders are always referred to as patricians by the papacy which implies that the Carolingian rulers were viewed by the popes as protectors of Rome and Catholicism. As a result, business pertaining to Rome and the papacy can be viewed as being business of the Carolingian imperium.

Achim Thomas Hack's work, titled Codex Carolinus, has done much to reignite scholarly interest in the collection through his analyses of individual letters and contextualising them within diplomatics and epistolography. Hack largely does not comment on the debate surrounding the implications of "de imperio".

== Bibliography ==
- Espelo, Dorine van, A Testimony of Carolingian Rule The Codex epistolaris Carolinus as a product of its time (Utrecht University, 2014)
- Espelo, Dorine van, 'A testimony of Carolingian rule? The Codex epistolaris carolinus, its historical context, and the meaning of imperium', Early Medieval Europe (2013), 21.3, 254-282. doi:10.1111/emed.12018
- Noble, Thomas, The Republic of St. Peter the birth of the Papal State, 680-825 (University of Pennsylvania Press, 1986)
