= Filioque =

Latin for 'and from the Son', added to the Nicene Creed

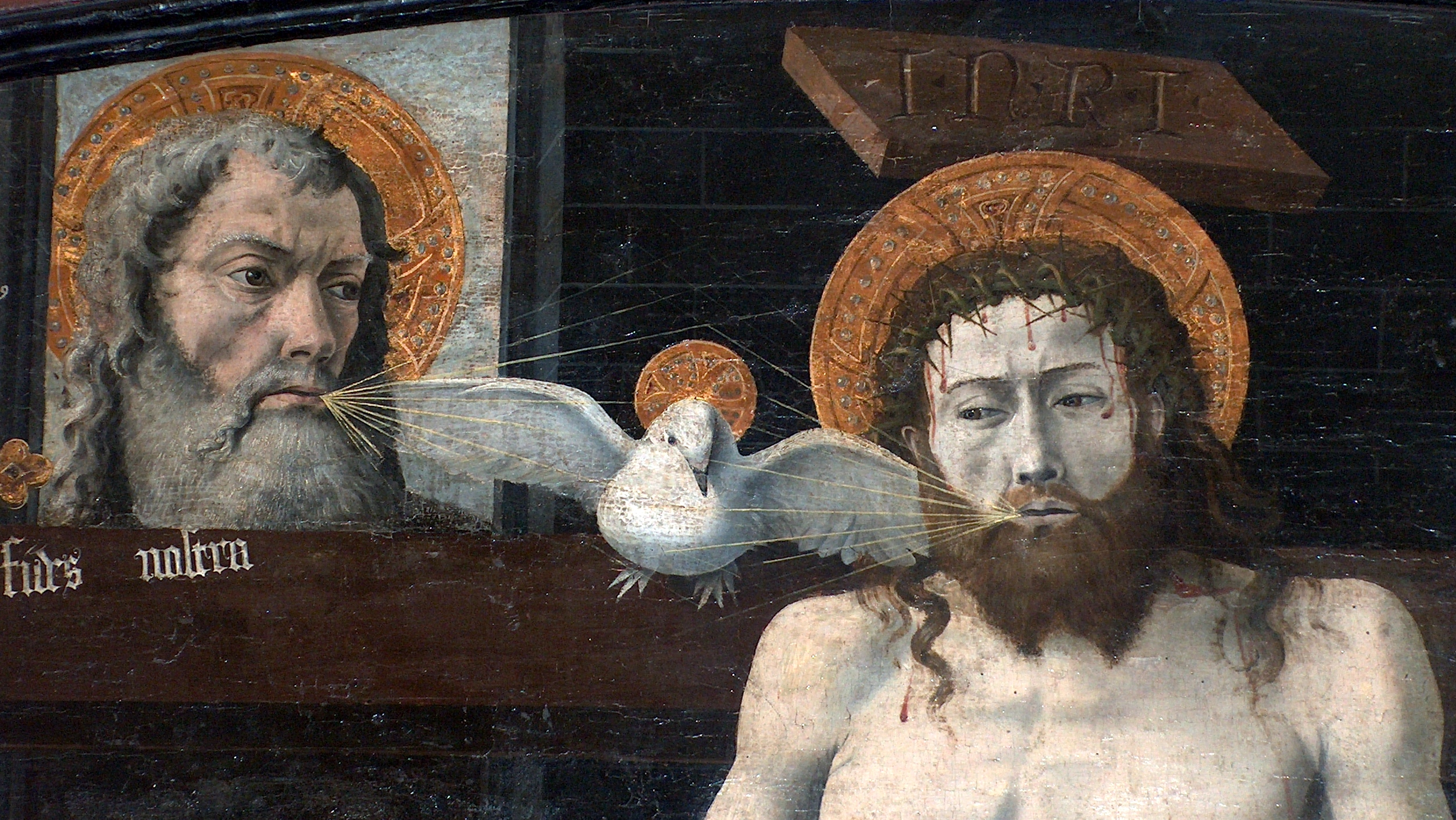
The Holy Spirit coming from both the Father and the Son, detail of the Boulbon Altarpiece, c. 1450. Originally from the high altar of the Chapelle Saint-Marcellin, Boulbon, France, now in the Louvre, Paris.

Filioque (English pronunciation /ˌfɪliˈoʊkwi, -kweɪ/ FIL-ee-OH-kwee, -kway; Ecclesiastical Latin: [filiˈokwe]) is a Latin term meaning and the Son. The inclusion or omission of this term in the Niceno-Constantinopolitan Creed has been a theological and procedural controversy, a major cause of the schism of 1054 AD between the Western and Eastern churches, and an ongoing source of disagreement for over a thousand years. The clause is inserted in the words Qui ex Patre [Filioque] procedit, 'Who proceeds from the Father [and the Son]', which specifically address the procession of the Holy Spirit, defining whether or not He proceeds from the Father, or from the Father and the Son (Jesus Christ).

The Nicene Creed was written in Greek, adopted by the First Council of Nicaea in 325 AD, and amended by the First Council of Constantinople in 381 AD. However, the wordings of the creeds adopted at Nicaea and Constantinople are not recorded in any surviving document until the Council of Chalcedon in 451 AD. Christian tradition holds that the Constantinople council added the passage stating that the Holy Spirit 'proceeds from the Father' (τὸ ἐκ του Πατρὸς ἐκπορευόμενον).

The Third Council of Toledo in 589 AD inserted the word Filioque into the creed, in response to the Arian interpretation of the Trinity, which the council considered heretical. Supporters argue that this was merely a clarification of existing theology expressed by the Church Fathers. Opponents argue that it violated Canon VII of the Council of Ephesus (431 AD), which forbade modifications to the creed. The use of Filioque spread to the Frankish church in the 8th century, who claimed that it was an authentic part of the Nicene Creed, so no canon had been violated. Under pressure from Henry II, Holy Roman Emperor, in 1014 AD Pope Benedict VIII incorporated Filioque into the creed used at Rome.

There have been a number of attempts to resolve the conflict, such as by explaining it as a matter of semantics not doctrine, or by appealing to the early seventh century work of Maximus the Confessor who is accepted by both sides.

== Nicene Creed ==
The Nicene Creed as amended by the Second Ecumenical Council held in Constantinople in 381 includes the section:

Greek original	Latin translation	English translation
Καὶ εἰς τὸ Πνεῦμα τὸ Ἅγιον, τὸ Κύριον, τὸ ζῳοποιόν	Et in Spiritum Sanctum, Dominum et vivificantem,	And in the Holy Spirit, the Lord, the giver of life,
τὸ ἐκ τοῦ Πατρὸς ἐκπορευόμενον,	qui ex Patre procedit,	who proceeds from the Father,
τὸ σὺν Πατρὶ καὶ Υἱῷ συμπροσκυνούμενον καὶ συνδοξαζόμενον,	qui cum Patre, et Filio simul adoratur, et cum glorificatur,	who with the Father and the Son is adored and glorified,

The controversy arises from the insertion of the word Filioque ("and the Son") in the line:

Latin	English translation
qui ex Patre Filioque procedit, (Note: In Greek: τὸ ἐκ τοῦ Πατρὸς [καὶ τοῦ Υἱοῦ] ἐκπορευόμενον,)	who proceeds from the Father and the Son,

== Controversy ==
The controversy referring to the term Filioque involves four separate disagreements:

- Controversy about the term itself
- Controversy about the orthodoxy of the doctrine of the procession of the Holy Spirit from the Father and the Son, to which the term refers
- Controversy about the legitimacy of inserting the term into the Niceno-Constantinopolitan Creed
- Controversy about the authority of the Pope to define the orthodoxy of the doctrine or to insert the term into the Niceno-Constantinopolitan Creed.

Although the disagreement about the doctrine preceded the disagreement about the insertion into the Creed, the two disagreements became linked to the third when the pope approved insertion of the term into the Niceno-Constantinopolitan Creed, in the 11th century. Anthony Siecienski writes that "Ultimately what was at stake was not only God's trinitarian nature, but also the nature of the Church, its teaching authority and the distribution of power among its leaders."

Hubert Cunliffe-Jones identifies two opposing Eastern Orthodox opinions about the Filioque, a "liberal" view and a "rigorist" view. The "liberal" view sees the controversy as being largely a matter of mutual miscommunication and misunderstanding. In this view, both East and West are at fault for failing to allow for a "plurality of theologies". Each side went astray in considering its theological framework as the only one that was doctrinally valid and applicable. Thus, neither side would accept that the dispute was not so much about conflicting dogmas as it was about different theologoumena or theological perspectives. While all Christians must be in agreement on questions of dogma, there is room for diversity in theological approaches.

This view is vehemently opposed by those in Eastern Orthodox Church whom Cunliffe-Jones identifies as holding a "rigorist" view. According to the standard Eastern Orthodox position, as pronounced by Photius, Mark of Ephesus and 20th century Eastern Orthodox theologians such as Vladimir Lossky, the Filioque question hinges on fundamental issues of dogma and cannot be dismissed as simply one of different theologoumena.

In a similar vein, Siecienski comments that, although it was common in the 20th century to view the Filioque as just another weapon in the power struggle between Rome and Constantinople and although this was occasionally the case, for many involved in the dispute, the theological issues outweighed by far the ecclesiological concerns. According to Siecienski, the deeper question was perhaps whether Eastern and Western Christianity had wound up developing "differing and ultimately incompatible teachings about the nature of God". Moreover, Siecienski asserts that the question of whether the teachings of East and West were truly incompatible became almost secondary to the fact that, starting around the 8th or 9th century, Christians on both sides of the dispute began to believe that the differences were irreconcilable.

From the view of the West, the Eastern rejection of the Filioque denied the consubstantiality of the Father and the Son and was thus a form of crypto-Arianism. In the East, the interpolation of the Filioque seemed to some to be an indication that the West was teaching a "substantially different faith". Siecienski asserts that, as much as power and authority were central issues in the debate, the strength of emotion rising even to the level of hatred can be ascribed to a belief that the other side had "destroyed the purity of the faith and refused to accept the clear teachings of the fathers on the Spirit's procession".

== History ==
=== New Testament ===
It is argued that in the relations between the persons of the Trinity, one person cannot "take" or "receive" (λήψεται) anything from either of the others except by way of procession. Biblical texts such as John 20:22 were seen by Fathers of the Church, especially Athanasius of Alexandria, Cyril of Alexandria and Epiphanius of Salamis, as grounds for saying that the Spirit "proceeds substantially from both" the Father and the Son. Other texts that have been used include Galatians 4:6, Romans 8:9, Philippians 1:19, where the Holy Spirit is called "the Spirit of the Son", "the Spirit of Christ", "the Spirit of Jesus Christ", texts in the Gospel of John on the sending of the Holy Spirit by Jesus, and John 16:7. Revelation 22:1 states that the river of the Water of Life in Heaven is "flowing from the throne of God and of the Lamb", which may be interpreted as the Holy Spirit proceeding from both the Father and the Son. Tension can be seen in comparing these two passages:

- John 14:26 NASB – [26] "But the Helper, the Holy Spirit, whom the Father will send in My name, He will teach you all things, and bring to your remembrance all that I said to you."
- John 15:26 NASB – [26] "When the Helper comes, whom I will send to you from the Father, [that is] the Spirit of truth who proceeds from the Father, He will testify about Me"

Siecienski asserts that "the New Testament does not explicitly address the procession of the Holy Spirit as later theology would understand the doctrine", although there are "certain principles established in the New Testament that shaped later Trinitarian theology, and particular texts that both Latins and Greeks exploited to support their respective positions vis-à-vis the Filioque". In contrast, Veli-Matti Kärkkäinen says that Eastern Orthodox believe that the absence of an explicit mention of the double procession of the Holy Spirit is a strong indication that the Filioque is a theologically erroneous doctrine.

=== Church Fathers ===
==== Cappadocian Fathers ====
Basil of Caesarea wrote: "Through the one Son [the Holy Spirit] is joined to the Father". He also said that the "natural goodness, inherent holiness, and royal dignity reaches from the Father through the only-begotten (διὰ τοῦ Μονογενοῦς) to the Spirit". However, Siecienski comments that "there are passages in Basil that are certainly capable of being read as advocating something like the Filioque, but to do so would be to misunderstand the inherently soteriological thrust of his work".

Gregory of Nazianzus distinguished the coming forth (προϊεον) of the Spirit from the Father from that of the Son from the Father by saying that the latter is by generation, but that of the Spirit by procession (ἐκπόρευσις), a matter on which there is no dispute between East and West, as shown also by the Latin Father Augustine of Hippo, who wrote that although biblical exegetes had not adequately discussed the individuality of the Holy Spirit:

they predicate Him to be the Gift of God, [and they infer] God not to give a gift inferior to Himself. [From that, they] predicate the Holy Spirit neither as begotten, like the Son, of the Father; [ ] nor [ ] of the Son, [ and] they do not affirm Him to owe that which He is to no one, [except] to the Father, [ ] lest we should establish two Beginnings without beginning [ ] which would be an assertion at once [ ] false and [ ] absurd, and one proper not to the catholic faith, but to the error of [Manichaeism].

Gregory of Nyssa stated:

The one (i.e. the Son) is directly from the First and the other (i.e., the Spirit) is through the one who is directly from the First (τὸ δὲ ἐκ τοῦ προσεχῶς ἐκ τοῦ πρώτου) with the result that the Only-begotten remains the Son and does not negate the Spirit's being from the Father since the middle position of the Son both protects His distinction as Only-begotten and does not exclude the Spirit from His natural relation to the Father.

==== Alexandrian Fathers ====
Cyril of Alexandria provides "a host of quotations that seemingly speak of the Spirit's 'procession' from both the Father and the Son". In these passages he uses the Greek verbs προϊέναι (like the Latin procedere) and προχεῖσθαι (flow from), not the verb ἐκπορεύεσθαι, the verb that appears in the Greek text of the Nicene Creed.

Since the Holy Spirit when he is in us effects our being conformed to God, and he actually proceeds from the Father and Son, it is abundantly clear that he is of the divine essence, in it in essence and proceeding from it

— Saint Cyril of Alexandria, Treasure of the Holy and Consubstantial Trinity, thesis 34

Epiphanius of Salamis is stated by Bulgakov to present in his writings "a whole series of expressions to the effect that the Holy Spirit is from the Father and the Son, out of the Father and the Son, from the Father and out of the Son, from Both, from one and the same essence as the Father and the Son, and so on". Bulgakov concludes: "The patristic teaching of the fourth century lacks that exclusivity which came to characterize Orthodox theology after Photius under the influence of repulsion from the Filioque doctrine. Although we do not here find the pure Filioque that Catholic theologians find, we also do not find that opposition to the Filioque that became something of an Orthodox or, rather, anti-Catholic dogma." (Note: The longer form of the creed of Epiphanius (374) included the doctrine: ἄκτιστον, ἐκ τοῦ πατρὸς ἐκπορευόμενον καὶ ἐκ τοῦ υἰοῦ λαμβανόμενον ("uncreated, who proceeds from the Father and is received from the Son").)

Regarding the Greek Fathers, whether Cappadocian or Alexandrian, there is, according to Siecienski, no citable basis for the claim historically made by both sides, that they explicitly either supported or denied the later theologies concerning the procession of the Spirit from the Son. However, they did enunciate important principles later invoked in support of one theology or the other. These included the insistence on the unique hypostatic properties of each Divine Person, in particular the Father's property of being, within the Trinity, the one cause, while they also recognized that the Persons, though distinct, cannot be separated, and that not only the sending of the Spirit to creatures but also the Spirit's eternal flowing forth (προϊέναι) from the Father within the Trinity is "through the Son" (διὰ τοῦ Υἱοῦ).

==== Latin Fathers ====
Siecienski remarked that, "while the Greek fathers were still striving to find language capable of expressing the mysterious nature of the Son's relationship to the Spirit, Latin theologians, even during Cyril's lifetime, had already found their answer – the Holy Spirit proceeds from the Father and the Son (ex Patre et Filio procedentem). The degree to which this teaching was compatible with, or contradictory to, the emerging Greek tradition remains, sixteen centuries later, subject to debate."

Before the creed of 381 became known in the West and even before it was adopted by the First Council of Constantinople, Christian writers in the West, of whom Tertullian (c. 160 – c. 220), Jerome (347–420), Ambrose (c. 338–397) and Augustine (354–430) are representatives, spoke of the Spirit as coming from the Father and the Son, while the expression "from the Father through the Son" is also found among them. (Note: Tertullian Adversus Praxeas 4 (ANF 3:599–600): "I believe the Spirit to proceed from no other source than from the Father through the Son") (Note: Tertullian Adversus Praxeas 5 (ANF 3:600–601).)

In the early 3rd century Roman province of Africa, Tertullian emphasises that Father, Son, and Holy Spirit all share a single divine substance, quality and power, (Note: Tertullian Adversus Praxeas 2 (ANF 3:598).) which he conceives of as flowing forth from the Father and being transmitted by the Son to the Spirit. (Note: Tertullian Adversus Praxeas 13 (ANF 3:607–609).) Using the metaphor the root, the shoot, and the fruit; the spring, the river, and the stream; and the sun, the ray, and point of light for the unity with distinction in the Trinity, he adds, "The Spirit, then, is third from God and the Son, ..."

In his arguments against Arianism, Marius Victorinus (c. 280–365) strongly connected the Son and the Spirit. (Note: Marius Victorinus Adversus Arium 1.13, 1.16; Kelly 2014, p. 358.)

In the mid-4th century, Hilary of Poitiers wrote of the Spirit "coming forth from the Father" and being "sent by the Son"; (Note: Hilary of Poitiers, De Trinitate 12.55 (NPNF2 9:233), quoted in NAOCTC (2003)) as being "from the Father through the Son"; (Note: Hilary of Poitiers, De Trinitate 12.56 (NPNF2 9:233), quoted in NAOCTC (2003)) and as "having the Father and the Son as his source"; (Note: Hilary of Poitiers, De Trinitate 2.29 (NPNF2 9:60), quoted in NAOCTC (2003)) in another passage, Hilary points to John 16:15 (where Jesus says: "All things that the Father has are mine; therefore I said that [the Spirit] shall take from what is mine and declare it to you"), and wonders aloud whether "to receive from the Son is the same thing as to proceed from the Father". (Note: Hilary of Poitiers, De Trinitate 8.20 (NPNF2 9:143), quoted in NAOCTC (2003))

In the late 4th century, Ambrose of Milan asserted that the Spirit "proceeds from (procedit a) the Father and the Son", without ever being separated from either. (Note: Ambrose of Milan, De Spiritu Sancto 1.11.120 (NPNF2 10:109).) Ambrose adds, "[W]ith You, Almighty God, Your Son is the Fount of Life, that is, the Fount of the Holy Spirit. For the Spirit is life ..." (Note: Ambrose of Milan, De Spiritu Sancto 1.15.172 (NPNF2 10:113).)

"None of these writers, however, makes the Spirit's mode of origin the object of special reflection; all are concerned, rather, to emphasize the equality of status of all three divine persons as God, and all acknowledge that the Father alone is the source of God's eternal being."

Pope Gregory I, in Gospel Homily 26, notes that the Son is "sent" by the Father both in the sense of an eternal generation and a temporal Incarnation. Thus, the Spirit is said to be "sent" by the Son from the Father both as to an eternal procession and a temporal mission. "The sending of the Spirit is that procession by which It proceeds from the Father and the Son." In his Moralia in Iob, initially composed while he was apocrisarius at the imperial court of Constantinople and later edited while Pope of Rome, Gregory wrote, "But the Mediator of God and men, the Man Christ Jesus, in all things has Him (the Holy Spirit) both always and continually present. For the same Spirit even in substance is brought forth from Him (quia et ex illo isdem Spiritus per substantiam profertur.) And thus, though He (the Spirit) abides in the holy Preachers, He is justly said to abide in the Mediator in a special manner, for that in them He abides of grace for a particular object, but in Him He abides substantially for all ends." Later in the Moralia (xxx.iv.17), St. Gregory writes of the procession of the Holy Spirit from Father and Son while defending their co-equality. Thus, he wrote, "[The Son] shews both how He springs from the Father not unequal to Himself, and how the Spirit of Both proceeds coeternal with Both. For we shall then openly behold, how That Which Is by an origin, is not subsequent to Him from Whom It springs; how He Who is produced by procession, is not preceded by Those from Whom He proceeded. We shall then behold openly how both The One [God] is divisibly Three [Persons] and the Three [Persons] indivisibly One [God]."

Later in his Dialogues, Gregory I took the Filioque doctrine for granted when he quoted John 16:7, and asked: if "it is certain that the Paraclete Spirit always proceeds from the Father and the Son, why does the Son say that He is about to leave so that [the Spirit] who never leaves the Son might come?" (Note: Gregory I, Dialogues, bk. 2 ch. 38) The text proposes an eternal procession from both Father and the Son by the use of the word "always" (semper). Gregory I's use of recessurum and recedit is also significant for the divine procession because although the Spirit always proceeds (semper procedat in the Vulgate translation) from the Father and the Son, the Spirit never leaves (numquam recedit) the Son by this eternal procession. The Latin fathers generally did not comment on the Greek original texts, but relied on one of two different Latin translations: Vetus Latina and the Vulgate.

==== Modern Christian theologians ====
Yves Congar commented, "The walls of separation do not reach as high as heaven." And Aidan Nichols remarked that "the Filioque controversy is, in fact, a casualty of the theological pluralism of the patristic Church", on the one hand the Latin and Alexandrian tradition, on the other the Cappadocian and later Byzantine tradition.

Among 20th-century Protestant theologians, Karl Barth was perhaps the staunchest defender of the Filioque doctrine. Barth was harshly critical of the ecumenical movement which advocated dropping the Filioque in order to facilitate reunification of the Christian churches. Barth's vigorous defence of the Filioque ran counter to the stance of a number of Protestant theologians of the latter half of the 20th century who favoured abandoning the use of the Filioque in the liturgy.

=== Nicene and Niceno-Constantinopolitan Creeds ===
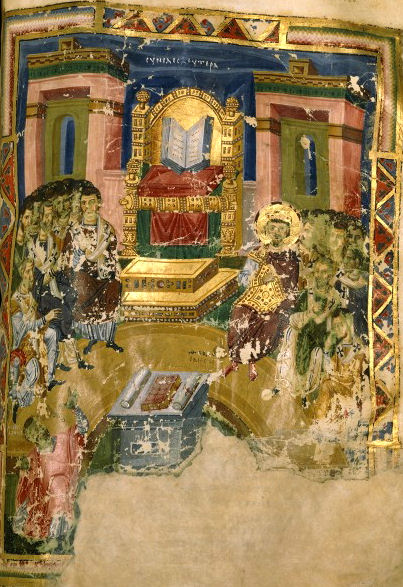
First Council of Constantinople with halo-adorned Emperor Theodosius I (miniature in Homilies of Gregory Nazianzus (879–882), Bibliothèque nationale de France)

The original Nicene Creed – composed in Greek and adopted by the first ecumenical council, Nicaea I (325) – ended with the words "and in the Holy Spirit" without defining the procession of the Holy Spirit. The procession of the Holy Spirit was defined in what is also called the Nicene Creed, or more accurately the Niceno-Constantinopolitan Creed, which was also composed in Greek.

Traditionally, the Niceno-Constantinopolitan Creed is attributed to the First Council of Constantinople of 381, whose participants, primarily Eastern bishops, met, decided issues (legates of Pope Damasus I were present).

The Niceno-Constantinopolitan Creed is not documented earlier than the Council of Chalcedon (451), which referred to it as "the creed [...] of the 150 saintly fathers assembled in Constantinople" in its acts. It was cited at Chalcedon I on instructions from the representative of the Emperor who chaired the meeting and who may have wished to present it as "a precedent for drawing up new creeds and definitions to supplement the Creed of Nicaea, as a way of getting round the ban on new creeds in" Ephesus I canon 7. The Niceno-Constantinopolitan Creed was recognized and received by Leo I at Chalcedon I. Scholars do not agree on the connection between Constantinople I and the Niceno-Constantinopolitan Creed, which was not simply an expansion of the Creed of Nicaea, and was probably based on another traditional creed independent of the one from Nicaea.

The Niceno-Constantinopolitan Creed is roughly equivalent to the Nicene Creed plus two additional articles: one on the Holy Spirit and another about the Church, baptism, and resurrection of the dead. For the full text of both creeds, see Comparison between Creed of 325 and Creed of 381.

The Niceno-Constantinopolitan Creed article professes:

Καὶ εἰς	Et in	And in
τὸ Πνεῦμα τὸ Ἅγιον,	Spiritum Sanctum,	the Holy Spirit,
τὸ κύριον, τὸ ζωοποιόν,	Dominum et vivificantem,	the Lord, the giver of life,
τὸ ἐκ τοῦ Πατρὸς ἐκπορευόμενον,	qui ex Patre procedit,	who proceeds from the Father.
τὸ σὺν Πατρὶ καὶ Υἱῷ	Qui cum Patre et Filio	With the Father and the Son
συμπροσκυνούμενον καὶ συνδοξαζόμενον,	simul adoratur et conglorificatur;	he is worshipped and glorified.
τὸ λαλῆσαν διὰ τῶν προφητῶν.	qui locutus est per prophetas.	He has spoken through the Prophets.

It speaks of the Holy Spirit "proceeding from the Father" – a phrase based on John 15:26.

The Greek word ἐκπορευόμενον (ekporeuomenon) refers to the ultimate source from which the proceeding occurs, but the Latin verb procedere (and the corresponding terms used to translate it into other languages) can apply also to proceeding through a mediate channel. Frederick Bauerschmidt notes that what Medieval theologians disregarded as minor objections about ambiguous terms, was in fact an "insufficient understanding of the semantic difference" between the Greek and Latin terms in both the East and the West. (Note: Congar (1959, pp. 30–31) points out that provincialism – about theological terms which shape ideas in source languages but do not map to exact terms in target languages, including: prosōpon, hypostasis, and substantia – contributes to "estrangement on the level of thought and mutual understanding.") The West used the more generic Latin term procedere (to move forward; to come forth) which is more synonymous with the Greek term προϊέναι (proienai) than the more specific Greek term ἐκπορεύεσθαι (ekporeuesthai, "to issue forth as from an origin"). The West traditionally used one term and the East traditionally used two terms to convey arguably equivalent and complementary meaning, that is, ekporeuesthai from the Father and proienai from the Son. Moreover, the more generic Latin term, procedere, does not have "the added implication of the starting-point of that movement; thus it is used to translate a number of other Greek theological terms." It is used as the Latin equivalent, in the Vulgate, of not only ἐκπορεύεσθαι, but also ἔρχεσθαι, προέρχεσθαι, προσέρχεσθαι, and προβαίνω (four times) and is used of Jesus' originating from God in John 8:42, although at that time Greek ἐκπορεύεσθαι was already beginning to designate the Holy Spirit's manner of originating from the Father as opposed to that of the Son (γέννησις — being born).

=== Third Ecumenical Council ===
The third Ecumenical council, Ephesus I (431), quoted the creed in its 325 form, not in that of 381, decreed in Ephesus I canon 7 that:

[ ] it is unlawful [ ] to bring forward, or to write, or to compose a different [ ] Faith as a rival to that established by the [ ] Fathers assembled [ ] in Nicæa. [ ] those who [ ] compose a different faith, or to introduce or offer it to persons desiring to turn to the acknowledgment of the truth, whether from Heathenism or from Judaism, or from any heresy whatsoever, shall be deposed, if they be bishops or clergymen; [ ] and if they be laymen, they shall be anathematized. [ ] (Note: Ephesus I canon 7 was translated into English in the late 19th century in Percival (1900, pp. 231–234) and translated in the late 20th century in Tanner (1990, pp. 65–66))

Ephesus I canon 7 was cited at the Second Council of Ephesus (449) and at the Council of Chalcedon (451), and was echoed in the Chalcedon definition. This account in the 2005 publication concerning the citing by Eutyches of Ephesus I canon 7 in his defence was confirmed by Stephen H. Webb in his 2011 book Jesus Christ, Eternal God.

Ephesus I canon 7, against additions to the Creed of Nicaea, is used as a polemic against the addition of Filioque to the Niceno-Constantinopolitan Creed, In any case, while Ephesus I canon 7 forbade setting up a different creed as a rival to that of Nicaea I, it was the creed attributed to Constantinople I that was adopted liturgically in the East and later a Latin variant was adopted in the West. The form of this creed that the West adopted had two additions: "God from God" (Deum de Deo) and "and the Son" (Filioque). Strictly speaking, Ephesus I canon 7 applies "only to the formula to be used in the reception of converts."

Philippe Labbe remarked that Ephesus I canons 7 and 8 are omitted in some collections of canons and that the collection of Dionysius Exiguus omitted all the Ephesus I canons, apparently considered that they did not concern the Church as a whole.

=== Fourth Ecumenical Council ===
At the fourth ecumenical council, Chalcedon I (451), both the Nicene Creed of 325 and the Niceno-Constantinopolitan Creed, were read, the former at the request of a bishop, the latter, against the protests of the bishops, on the initiative of the emperor's representative, "doubtless motivated by the need to find a precedent for drawing up new creeds and definitions to supplement the Creed of Nicaea, as a way of getting round the ban on new creeds in" Ephesus I canon 7. The acts of Chalcedon I defined that:

[ ] no one shall [ ] bring forward a different faith [ ], nor to write, nor to put together, nor to excogitate, nor to teach it to others. [Those who] either [ ] put together another faith, or [ ] bring forward or [ ] teach or [ ] deliver a different Creed [ ] to [those who] wish to be converted [ ] from the Gentiles, or Jews or any heresy whatever, if they be Bishops or clerics let them be deposed, [ ] but if they be monks or laics: let them be anathematized. [ ]

=== Possible earliest use in the Creed ===
Some scholars claim that the earliest example of the Filioque clause in the East is contained in the West Syriac recension of the profession of faith of the Church of the East formulated at the Council of Seleucia-Ctesiphon in Persia in 410. (Note: Indications of "filioque language can also be found in certain early Syriac sources," according to Plested (2011).) This council was held some twenty years before the Nestorian Schism that caused the later split between the Church of the East and the Church in the Roman Empire. Since wording of that recension ("who is from the Father and the Son") does not contain any mention of the term "procession" or any of the other particular terms that would describe relations between Father, Son and the Holy Spirit, the previously mentioned claim for the "earliest use" of Filioque clause is not universally accepted by scholars. Furthermore, another recension that is preserved in the East Syriac sources of the Church of the East contains only the phrase "and in the Holy Spirit".

Various professions of faith confessed the doctrine during the patristic age. The Fides Damasi (380 or 5th century), a profession of faith attributed to Pseudo-Damasus or Jerome, includes a formula of the doctrine. The Symbolum Toletanum I (400), a profession of faith legislated by the Toledo I synod, includes a formula of the doctrine. The Athanasian Creed (5th century), a profession of faith misattributed to Athanasius, includes a formula of the doctrine.

The generally accepted first found insertion of the term Filioque into the Niceno-Constantinopolitan Creed, in Western Christianity, is in acts of the Third Council of Toledo (Toledo III) (589), nearly two centuries later, but it may be a later interpolation. (Note: An additional profession of faith in the acts of Toledo III, The Profession of Faith of King Reccaredus, included the doctrine but not the term: "Spiritus aeque Sanctus confitendus a nobis et praedicandus est a Patre et Filio procedere et cum Patre et Filio unius esse substantiae.")

=== Procession of the Holy Spirit ===
As early as the 4th century, a distinction was made, in connection with the Trinity, between the two Greek verbs ἐκπορεύεσθαι (the verb used in the original Greek text of the 381 Nicene Creed) and προϊέναι. Gregory of Nazianzus wrote: "The Holy Ghost is truly Spirit, coming forth (προϊέναι) from the Father indeed, but not after the manner of the Son, for it is not by Generation but by Procession (ἐκπορεύεσθαι)". (Note: Gregory of Nazianzus Oratio 39 12 (NPNF2 7:356).)

That the Holy Spirit "proceeds" from the Father and the Son in the sense of the Latin word procedere and the Greek προϊέναι (as opposed to the Greek ἐκπορεύεσθαι) was taught by the early 5th century by Cyril of Alexandria in the East. (Note: Cyril of Alexandria, Thesaurus, (PG 75:585).) The Athanasian Creed, probably composed as early as the mid 5th-century, and a dogmatic epistle of Pope Leo I, (Note: Pope Leo I Quam laudabiliter c. 1 (PL 54:680–681); DH 2012, n. 284) (Note: "The Holy Ghost is from the Father and the Son, neither made, nor created, nor begotten, but proceeding". In the original Latin: "Spiritus Sanctus a Patre et Filio: non-factus, nec creatus, nec genitus, sed procedens".) who declared in 446 that the Holy Spirit proceeds from both Father and Son.

Although the Eastern Fathers were aware that the procession of the Holy Spirit from the Father and the Son was taught in the West, they did not generally regard it as heretical. According to Sergei Bulgakov "a whole series of Western writers, including popes who are venerated as saints by the Eastern church, confess the procession of the Holy Spirit also from the Son; and it is even more striking that there is virtually no disagreement with this theory." In 447, Leo I taught it in a letter to a Spanish bishop and an anti-Priscillianist council held the same year proclaimed it. The argument was taken a crucial step further in 867 by the affirmation in the East that the Holy Spirit proceeds not merely "from the Father" but "from the Father alone".

The Filioque was inserted into the Creed as an anti-Arian addition, by the Third Council of Toledo (589), at which King Reccared I and some Arians in his Visigothic Kingdom converted to orthodox, Catholic Christianity. (Note: While Reccared I converted to Catholicism, his successor Liuva II reverted to Arianism.) The Toledo XI synod (675) included the doctrine but not the term in its profession of faith.

Other Toledo synods "to affirm Trinitarian consubstantiality" between 589 and 693.

The Filioque clause was confirmed by subsequent synods in Toledo and soon spread throughout the West, not only in Spain, but also in Francia, after Clovis I, king of the Salian Franks, converted to Christianity in 496; and in England, where the Council of Hatfield (680), presided over by Archbishop of Canterbury Theodore of Tarsus, a Greek, imposed the doctrine as a response to Monothelitism.

However, while the doctrine was taught in Rome, the term was not professed liturgically in the Creed until 1014.

In the Vulgate the Latin verb procedere, which appears in the Filioque passage of the Creed in Latin, is used to translate several Greek verbs. While one of those verbs, ἐκπορεύεσθαι, the one in the corresponding phrase in the Creed in Greek, "was beginning to take on a particular meaning in Greek theology designating the Spirit's unique mode of coming-to-be [...] procedere had no such connotations".

Although Hilary of Poitiers is often cited as one of "the chief patristic source(s) for the Latin teaching on the filioque", Siecienski says that "there is also reason for questioning Hilary's support for the Filioque as later theology would understand it, especially given the ambiguous nature of (Hilary's) language as it concerns the procession."

However, a number of Latin Church Fathers of the 4th and 5th centuries explicitly speak of the Holy Spirit as proceeding "from the Father and the Son", the phrase in the present Latin version of the Nicene Creed. Examples are what is called the creed of Pope Damasus I, Ambrose of Milan ("one of the earliest witnesses to the explicit affirmation of the Spirit's procession from the Father and the Son"), Augustine of Hippo (whose writings on the Trinity "became the foundation of subsequent Latin trinitarian theology and later served as the foundation for the doctrine of the filioque"). and Leo I, who qualified as "impious" those who say "there is not one who begat, another who is begotten, another who proceeded from both [alius qui de utroque processerit]"; he also accepted the Council of Chalcedon, with its reaffirmation of the Niceno-Constantinopolitan Creed, in its original "from the Father" form, as much later did his successor Pope Leo III who professed his faith in the teaching expressed by the Filioque, while opposing its inclusion in the Creed.

Thereafter, Eucherius of Lyon, Gennadius of Massilia, Boethius, Agnellus, Bishop of Ravenna, Cassiodorus, Gregory of Tours are witnesses that the idea that the Holy Spirit proceeds from the Son was well established as part of the (Western) Church's faith, before Latin theologians began to concern themselves about how the Spirit proceeds from the Son.

Pope Gregory I is usually counted as teaching the Spirit's procession from the Son, although Byzantine theologians, quoting from Greek translations of his work rather than the original, present him as a witness against it, and although he sometimes speaks of the Holy Spirit as proceeding from the Father without mentioning the Son. Siecienski says that, in view of the widespread acceptance by then that the Holy Spirit proceeds from the Father and the Son, it would be strange if Gregory did not advocate the teaching, "even if he did not understand the filioque as later Latin theology would – that is, in terms of a 'double procession'."

=== "From the Father through the Son" ===
Church Fathers also use the phrase "from the Father through the Son". (Note: John of Damascus, Expositio Fidei 1.12 (NFPF2 9:15)) Cyril of Alexandria, who undeniably several times states that the Holy Spirit issues from the Father and the Son, also speaks of the Holy Spirit coming from the Father through the Son, two different expressions that for him are complementary: the procession of the Holy Spirit from the Father does not exclude the Son's mediation and the Son receives from the Father a participation in the Holy Spirit's coming. (Note: Boulnois (2003, pp. 106–107) notes that some ascribe an opinion about the Filioque to Cyril of Alexandria by "quotations grouped in anthologies" without analysis or context. The reason Cyril asserted a dependence was "the continuity between economy and theology" in his analysis of the relationship between the Son and the Holy Spirit. Cyril's reasons "correspond to different mechanisms" within the Trinity "which break up the simplistic opposition between the Latin schema of the triangle and the Greek model of the straight line." Boulnois thinks it is "impossible to classify Cyril unilaterally by applying [ ] a later conflict which, [ ] is largely alien to him.") Cyril, in his ninth anathema against Nestorius, had stated that the Spirit was Christ's own Spirit, which led Theodoret of Cyrus to question whether Cyril was advocating the idea that "the Spirit has his subsistence from the Son or through the Son". For Theodoret this idea was both "blasphemous and impious [...] for we believe the Lord who has said: 'the Spirit of Truth who proceeds from the Father...'". Cyril denied that he held this teaching, leading Theodoret to confirm the orthodoxy of Cyril's trinitarian theology, since the Church had always taught that "the Holy Spirit does not receive existence from or through the Son, but proceeds from the Father and is called the proprium of the Son because of his consubstantiality. The phrase "from the Son or through the Son" continued to be used by Cyril, albeit in light of the clarification. Thomas Aquinas questioned the veracity of this claim by Theodoret. He wrote: "Again Theodore in an epistle to John of Antioch expresses himself as follows: “The Holy Spirit does not come from the Son nor has he his substance from the Son, but he Proceeds from the Father: he is called the Spirit of the Son because he is consubstantial with him.” Now the above words were attributed by this Theodore to Cyril, as though he had written them in a letter which he wrote to John of Antioch, and yet they are not to be found there: but he expresses himself thus: “The Spirit of God the Father proceeds indeed from him, but he proceeds also from the Son, being one with him in essence.”" The Roman Catholic Church accepts both phrases, and considers that they do not affect the reality of the same faith and instead express the same truth in slightly different ways. The influence of Augustine of Hippo made the phrase "proceeds from the Father through the Son" popular throughout the West, but, while used also in the East, "through the Son" was later, according to Philip Schaff, dropped or rejected by some as being nearly equivalent to "from the Son" or "and the Son". Others spoke of the Holy Spirit proceeding "from the Father", as in the text of the Nicaeno-Constantinopolitan Creed, which "did not state that the Spirit proceeds from the Father alone".

=== First Eastern opposition ===
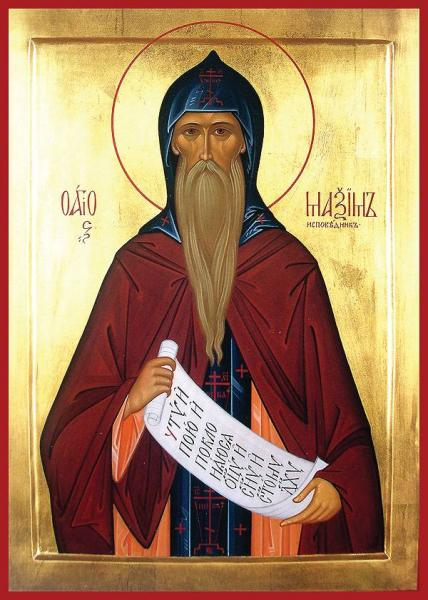
Maximus the Confessor

The first recorded objection by a representative of Eastern Christianity against the Western belief that the Holy Spirit proceeds from the Father and the Son occurred when Patriarch Paul II of Constantinople (r. 642–653) made accusations against either Pope Theodore I (r. 642–649) or Pope Martin I (r. 649–653) for using the expression. Theodore I excommunicated Paul II in 647 for Monothelitism. In response to the attack by Paul, Maximus the Confessor, a Greek opponent of Monothelitism, declared that it was wrong to condemn the Roman use of "and the Son" because the Romans "have produced the unanimous evidence of the Latin Fathers, and also of Cyril of Alexandria [...] On the basis of these texts, they have shown that they have not made the Son the cause of the Spirit – they know in fact that the Father is the only cause of the Son and the Spirit, the one by begetting and the other by procession – but that they have manifested the procession through him and have thus shown the unity and identity of the essence." He also indicated that the differences between the Latin and Greek languages were an obstacle to mutual understanding, since "they cannot reproduce their idea in a language and in words that are foreign to them as they can in their mother-tongue, just as we too cannot do". (Note: Maximus the Confessor, Letter to Marinus, (PG 91:136).)

=== Claims of authenticity ===
At the end of the 8th and the beginning of the 9th century, the Church of Rome was faced with an unusual challenge regarding the use of Filioque clause. Among the Church leaders in Frankish Kingdom of that time a notion was developing that Filioque clause was in fact an authentic part of the original Creed. Trying to deal with that problem and its potentially dangerous consequences, the Church of Rome found itself in the middle of a widening rift between its own Daughter-Church in Frankish Kingdom and Sister-Churches of the East. Popes of that time, Hadrian I and Leo III, had to face various challenges while trying to find solutions that would preserve the unity of the Church.

First signs of the problems were starting to show by the end of the reign of Frankish king Pepin the Short (751–768). Use of the Filioque clause in the Frankish Kingdom led to controversy with envoys of the Byzantine Emperor Constantine V at the Synod of Gentilly (767).

The Synod of Gentilly (Latin: Concilsum Gentiliacense) was a Christian Frankish Synod held on Christmas day in 767 AD located at Gentilly, Val-de-Marne. There are no surviving acts of the council. Most of the bishops of Gaul and Germany were present as well as 6 papal legates, 6 ambassadors from the Byzantine emperor Constantine V, several Greek bishops and Pepin the Short with a number of his nobles. The question of the procession of the Holy Ghost was discussed at the council, specifically regarding the use of the Filioque inside the Nicene Creed. This caused controversy among the ambassadors of the Byzantine emperor. It is unknown whether it was the Franks or the Greeks that broached the issue concerning the Filioque, but it is more likely that the Franks introduced the issue. There was also a discussion on the veneration of images. The synod sanctioned the use of images during worship, which implies a condemnation of the iconoclastic policies of the Byzantine emperor and refusal to enter diplomatic and political negotiations with the east.

As the practice of chanting the interpolated Latin Credo at Mass spread in the West, the Filioque became a part of Latin liturgy throughout the Frankish Kingdom. The practice of chanting the Creed was adopted in Charlemagne's court by the end of the 8th century and spread through all of his realms, including some northern parts of Italy, but not to Rome, where its use was not accepted until 1014.

Serious problems erupted in 787 after the Second Council of Nicaea when Charlemagne accused the Patriarch Tarasios of Constantinople of infidelity to the faith of the First Council of Nicaea, allegedly because he had not professed the procession of the Holy Spirit from the Father "and the Son", but only "through the Son". Pope Adrian I rejected those accusations and tried to explain to the Frankish king that pneumatology of Tarasios was in accordance with the teachings of the holy Fathers. (Note: Charlemagne's legates claimed that Tarasius, at his installation, did not follow the Nicene faith and profess that the Spirit proceeds from the Father and the Son, but confessed rather his procession from the Father through the Son (Mansi 13.760). The Pope strongly rejected Charlemagne's protest, showing at length that Tarasius and the Council, on this and other points, maintained the faith of the Fathers (ibid. 759–810).) Surprisingly, efforts of the pope had no effect.

The true scale of the problem became evident during the following years. The Frankish view of the Filioque was emphasized again in the Libri Carolini, composed around 791–793. (Note: Following this exchange of letters with the pope, Charlemagne commissioned the Libri Carolini (791–793) to challenge the positions both of the iconoclast council of 754 and of the Council of Nicaea of 787 on the veneration of icons. Again because of poor translations, the Carolingians misunderstood the actual decision of the latter Council.) Openly arguing that the word Filioque was part of the Creed of 381, the authors of Libri Carolini demonstrated not only the surprising lack of basic knowledge but also the lack of will to receive right advice and counsel from the Mother-Church in Rome. Frankish theologians reaffirmed the notion that the Spirit proceeds from the Father and the Son, and rejected as inadequate the teaching that the Spirit proceeds from the Father through the Son. That claim was both erroneous and dangerous for the preservation of the unity of the Church.

In those days, another theological problem appeared to be closely connected with the use of Filioque in the West. In the late 8th century, a controversy arose between Bishop Elipandus of Toledo and Beatus of Liébana over the former's teaching (which has been called Spanish Adoptionism) that Christ in his humanity was the adoptive son of God. Elipandus was supported by Bishop Felix of Urgel. In 785, Pope Hadrian I condemned the teaching of Elipandus. In 791, Felix appealed to Charlemagne in defense of the Spanish Adoptionist teaching, sending him a tract outlining it. He was condemned at the Synod of Regensburg (792) and was sent to Pope Hadrian in Rome, where he made of profession of orthodox faith, but returned to Spain and there reaffirmed Adoptionism. Elipandus wrote to the bishops of the territories controlled by Charlemagne in defence of his teaching, which was condemned at the Council of Frankfurt (794) and at the Synod of Friuli (796). The controversy encouraged those who rejected Adoptionism to introduce into the liturgy the use of the Creed, with the Filioque, to profess belief that Christ was the Son from eternity, not adopted as a son at his baptism.

At the Synod of Friuli, Paulinus II of Aquileia stated that the insertion of Filioque in the 381 Creed of the First Council of Constantinople was no more a violation of the prohibition of new creeds than were the insertions into the 325 Creed of the First Council of Nicaea that were done by the First Council of Constantinople itself. What was forbidden, he said, was adding or removing something "craftily [...] contrary to the sacred intentions of the fathers", not a council's addition that could be shown to be in line with the intentions of the Fathers and the faith of the ancient Church. Actions such as that of the First Council of Contantinople were sometimes called for in order to clarify the faith and do away with heresies that appear. The views of Paulinus show that some advocates of Filioque clause were quite aware of the fact that it actually was not part of the Creed.

Political events that followed additionally complicated the issue. According to John Meyendorff, and John Romanides the Frankish efforts to get new Pope Leo III to approve the addition of Filioque to the Creed were due to a desire of Charlemagne, who in 800 had been crowned in Rome as Emperor, to find grounds for accusations of heresy against the East. The Pope's refusal to approve the interpolation of the Filioque into the Creed avoided arousing a conflict between East and West about this matter. During his reign (r. 795–816), and for another two centuries, there was no Creed at all in the Roman rite Mass.

Reasons for the continuing refusal of the Frankish Church to adopt the positions of the Church of Rome on necessity of leaving Filioque outside of Creed remained unknown. In 808 or 809 apparent controversy arose in Jerusalem between the Greek monks of one monastery and the Frankish Benedictine monks of another: the Greeks reproached the latter for, among other things, singing the creed with the Filioque included. In response, the theology of the Filioque was expressed in the 809 local Council of Aachen (809).

Faced with another endorsement of the Filioque, Pope Leo III denied his approval and publicly posted the Creed in Rome without the Filioque, written in Greek and Latin on two silver plaques, in defense of the Orthodox Faith (810) stating his opposition to the addition of the Filioque into the Creed. Although Leo III did not disapprove the Filioque doctrine, the Pope strongly believed the clause should not be included into the Creed. (Note: "Leo III defended the Filioque outside the Creed.) In spite of the efforts of the Church of Rome, the acceptance of the Filioque clause in the Creed of the Frankish Church proved to be irreversible.

=== Photian controversy ===
Around 860 the controversy over the Filioque broke out in the course of the disputes between Patriarch Photius of Constantinople and Patriarch Ignatius of Constantinople. Pope Nicholas I contended that Patriarch Ignatios of Constantinople was deposed in 858 and Photius I raised to the patriarchal see in violation of ecclesiastical law and at a Roman synod held in April 863, he excommunicated Photius. In 867 Photius was Patriarch of Constantinople and issued an Encyclical to the Eastern Patriarchs, and called a council in Constantinople in which he charged the Western Church with heresy and schism because of differences in practices, in particular for the Filioque and the authority of the Papacy. The situation had escalated from issues of jurisdiction and custom to include matters of dogma. This council declared Pope Nicholas anathema, excommunicated and deposed.

Photius excluded not only "and the Son" but also "through the Son" with regard to the eternal procession of the Holy Spirit: for him "through the Son" applied only to the temporal mission of the Holy Spirit (the sending in time). He maintained that the eternal procession of the Holy Spirit is "from the Father alone". (Note: Photius, Epistula 2 (PG 102:721–741).) This phrase was verbally a novelty, however, Eastern Orthodox theologians generally hold that in substance the phrase is only a reaffirmation of traditional teaching. Sergei Bulgakov, on the other hand, declared that Photius's doctrine itself "represents a sort of novelty for the Eastern church". Bulgakov writes: "The Cappadocians expressed only one idea: the monarchy of the Father and, consequently, the procession of the Holy Spirit precisely from the Father. They never imparted to this idea, however, the exclusiveness that it acquired in the epoch of the Filioque disputes after Photius, in the sense of ek monou tou Patros (from the Father alone)"; Nichols summarized that, "Bulgakov finds it amazing that with all his erudition Photius did not see that the 'through the Spirit' of Damascene and others constituted a different theology from his own, just as it is almost incomprehensible to find him trying to range the Western Fathers and popes on his Monopatrist side."

Photius's importance endured in regard to relations between East and West. He is recognized as a saint by the Eastern Orthodox Church and his line of criticism has often been echoed later, making reconciliation between East and West difficult.

At least three councils – Council of Constantinople (867), Fourth Council of Constantinople (Roman Catholic) (869), and Fourth Council of Constantinople (Eastern Orthodox) (879) – were held in Constantinople over the actions of Emperor Michael III in deposing Ignatius and replacing him with Photius. The Council of Constantinople (867) was convened by Photius to address the question of Papal Supremacy over all of the churches and their patriarchs and the use of the Filioque.

The council of 867 was followed by the Fourth Council of Constantinople (Roman Catholic), in 869, which reversed the previous council and was promulgated by Rome. The Fourth Council of Constantinople (Eastern Orthodox), in 879, restored Photius to his see. It was attended by Western legates Cardinal Peter of St Chrysogonus, Paul Bishop of Ancona and Eugene Bishop of Ostia who approved its canons, but it is unclear whether it was ever promulgated by Rome.

=== Adoption in Latin liturgies ===
Latin liturgical use of the Niceno-Constantinopolitan Creed with the added term spread between the 8th and 11th centuries.

Only in 1014, at the request of King Henry II of Germany (who was in Rome for his coronation as Holy Roman Emperor and was surprised by the different custom in force there) did Pope Benedict VIII, who owed to Henry II his restoration to the papal throne after usurpation by Antipope Gregory VI, have the Creed with the addition of Filioque, sung at Mass in Rome for the first time. In some other places Filioque was incorporated in the Creed even later: in parts of southern Italy after the Council of Bari in 1098 and at Paris seemingly not even by 1240, 34 years before the Second Council of Lyon defined that the Holy Spirit "proceeds eternally from the Father and from the Son, not as from two principles but from a single principle, not by two spirations but by a single spiration".

Since then the Filioque phrase has been included in the Creed throughout the Latin Church except where Greek is used in the liturgy.

Its adoption among the Eastern Catholic Churches (formerly known as Uniate churches) has been discouraged.

=== East–West controversy ===
Eastern opposition to the Filioque strengthened after the 11th century East–West Schism. According to the synodal edict, a Latin anathema, in the excommunication of 1054, against the Greeks included: "ut Pneumatomachi sive Theomachi, Spiritus sancti ex Filio processionem ex symbolo absciderunt" ("as pneumatomachi and theomachi, they have cut from the Creed the procession of the holy Spirit from the Son"). The Council of Constantinople, in a synodal edict, responded with anathemas against the Latins:" ("And besides all this, and quite unwilling to see that it is they claim that the Spirit proceeds from the Father, not [only], but also from the Son – as if they have no evidence of the evangelists of this, and if they do not have the dogma of the ecumenical council regarding this slander. For the Lord our God says, "even the Spirit of truth, which proceeds from the Father (John 15:26)". But parents say this new wickedness of the Spirit, who proceeds from the Father and the Son.")

Two councils that were held to heal the break discussed the question.

The Second Council of Lyon (1274) accepted the profession of faith of Emperor Michael VIII Palaiologos: "We believe also ⟨in⟩ the Holy Spirit, fully, perfectly and truly God, proceeding from the Father and the Son, fully equal, of the same substance, equally almighty and equally eternal with the Father and the Son in all things." and the Greek participants, including Patriarch Joseph I of Constantinople sang the Creed three times with the Filioque clause. Most Byzantine Christians feeling disgust and recovering from the Latin Crusaders' conquest and betrayal, refused to accept the agreement made at Lyon with the Latins. Michael VIII was excommunicated by Pope Martin IV in November 1281, and later died, after which Patriarch Joseph I's successor, Patriarch John XI of Constantinople, who had become convinced that the teaching of the Greek Fathers was compatible with that of the Latins, was forced to resign, and was replaced by Patriarch Gregory II of Constantinople, who was strongly of the opposite opinion.

Lyons II did not require those Christians to change the recitation of the creed in their liturgy.

Lyons II stated "that the Holy Spirit proceeds eternally from the Father and the Son, not as from two principles, but one, not from two spirations but by only one," is "the unchangeable and true doctrine of the orthodox Fathers and Doctors, both Latin and Greek." So, it "condemn[ed] and disapprove[d of] those who [ ] deny that the Holy Spirit proceeds eternally from Father and Son or who [ ] assert that the Holy Spirit proceeds from the Father and the Son as from two principles, not from one."

The local Orthodox Council of Constantinople (1285) was called in response to Lyons II and repudiated the union of the Churches, condemning the pro-Unionist patriarch John XI Beccus, and giving a more explicit condemnation of the Filioque than any earlier councils. It specifically condemned:

- that the Father is, through the Son, the essential cause of the Spirit.
- that the Spirit exists through the Son and from the Son.
- that the preposition “through” is equivalent to “from.”
- that the one unique essence and divinity of the Father and the Son is the cause of the Spirit.
- that the Father and the Son together constitute a single cause in the procession of the Spirit.
- that the procession of the Spirit from the Father is an activity of the essence, not of the hypostasis.
- that the expression “through the Son,” when used in reference to the creation of the world, indicates that the Son is the primordial or initial cause.
- that the Son is the “fountain of life” or the cause of life in the procession of the Spirit, just as the Virgin is said to be the fountain of life in giving birth to Christ.

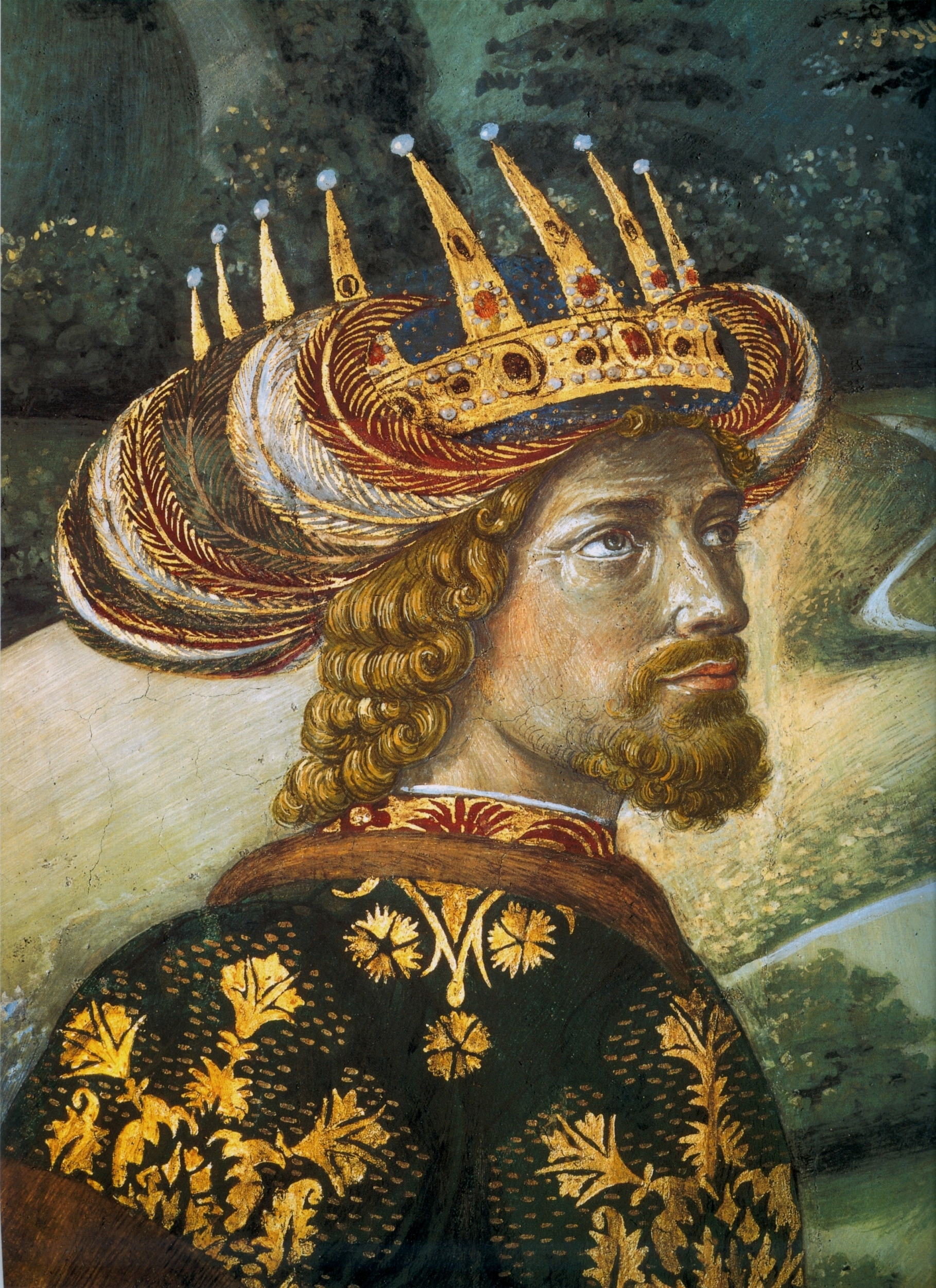
John VIII Palaiologos by Benozzo Gozzoli

Another attempt at reunion was made at the 15th century Council of Florence, to which Emperor John VIII Palaiologos, Ecumenical Patriarch Joseph II of Constantinople, and other bishops from the East had gone in the hope of getting Western military aid against the looming Ottoman Empire. Thirteen public sessions held in Ferrara from 8 October to 13 December 1438 the Filioque question was debated without agreement. The Greeks held that any addition whatever, even if doctrinally correct, to the Creed had been forbidden by Ephesus I, while the Latins claimed that this prohibition concerned meaning, not words.

During the Council of Florence in 1439, accord continued to be elusive, until the argument prevailed among the Greeks themselves that, though the Greek and the Latin saints expressed their faith differently, they were in agreement substantially, since saints cannot err in faith; and by 8 June the Greeks accepted the Latin statement of doctrine. Joseph II died on 10 June. A statement on the Filioque question was included in the Laetentur Caeli decree of union, which was signed on 5 July 1439 and promulgated the next day – Mark of Ephesus was the only bishop not to sign the agreement.

The Eastern Church refused to consider the agreement reached at Florence binding, since the death of Joseph II had for the moment left it without a Patriarch of Constantinople. There was strong opposition to the agreement in the East, and when in 1453, 14 years after the agreement, the promised military aid from the West still had not arrived and Constantinople fell to the Turks, neither Eastern Christians nor their new rulers wished union between them and the West.

=== Councils of Jerusalem, AD 1583 and 1672 ===
The Synod of Jerusalem (1583) condemned those who do not believe the Holy Spirit proceeds from the Father alone in essence, and from Father and Son in time. In addition, this synod re-affirmed adherence to the decisions of Nicaea I. The Synod of Jerusalem (1672) similarly re-affirmed procession of the Holy Spirit from the Father alone.

=== Reformation ===
Although the Protestant Reformation challenged a number of church doctrines, they accepted the Filioque without reservation. However, they did not have a polemical insistence on the Western view of the Trinity. In the second half of the 16th century, Lutheran scholars from the University of Tübingen initiated a dialogue with the Patriarch Jeremias II of Constantinople. The Tübingen Lutherans defended the Filioque arguing that, without it, "the doctrine of the Trinity would lose its epistemological justification in the history of revelation." In the centuries that followed, the Filioque was considered by Protestant theologians to be a key component of the doctrine of the Trinity, although it was never elevated to being a pillar of Protestant theology. Zizioulas characterizes Protestants as finding themselves "in the same confusion as those fourth century theologians who were unable to distinguish between the two sorts of procession, 'proceeding from' and 'sent by'."

== Present position of various churches ==
=== Catholicism ===
The Catholic Church holds, as a truth dogmatically defined since as far back as Pope Leo I in 447, who followed a Latin and Alexandrian tradition, that the Holy Spirit proceeds from the Father and the Son. It rejects the notion that the Holy Spirit proceeds jointly and equally from two principles (Father and Son) and teaches dogmatically that "the Holy Spirit proceeds eternally from the Father and the Son, not as from two principles but as from one single principle". It holds that the Father, as the "principle without principle", is the first origin of the Spirit, but also that he, as Father of the only Son, is with the Son the single principle from which the Spirit proceeds.

It also holds that the procession of the Holy Spirit can be expressed as "from the Father through the Son". The agreement that brought about the 1595 Union of Brest expressly declared that those entering full communion with Rome "should remain with that which was handed down to (them) in the Holy Scriptures, in the Gospel, and in the writings of the holy Greek Doctors, that is, that the Holy Spirit proceeds, not from two sources and not by a double procession, but from one origin, from the Father through the Son".

The Catholic Church recognizes that the Creed, as confessed at the First Council of Constantinople, did not add "and the Son", when it spoke of the Holy Spirit as proceeding from the Father, and that this addition was admitted to the Latin liturgy between the 8th and 11th centuries. When quoting the Niceno-Constantinopolitan Creed, as in the 2000 document Dominus Iesus, it does not include Filioque. It views as complementary the Eastern-tradition expression "who proceeds from the Father" (profession of which it sees as affirming that the Spirit comes from the Father through the Son) and the Western-tradition expression "who proceeds from the Father and the Son", with the Eastern tradition expressing firstly the Father's character as first origin of the Spirit, and the Western tradition giving expression firstly to the consubstantial communion between Father and Son.

The monarchy of the Father is a doctrine upheld not only by those who, like Photius, speak of a procession from the Father alone. It is also asserted by theologians who speak of a procession from the Father through the Son or from the Father and the Son. Examples cited by Siecienski include Bessarion, Maximus the Confessor, Bonaventure, and the Council of Worms (868), The same remark is made by Jürgen Moltmann. (Note: Similarly Moltmann observes that "the filioque was never directed against the 'monarchy' of the Father" and that the principle of the "monarchy" has "never been contested by the theologians of the Western Church". If these statements can be accepted by the Western theologians today in their full import of doing justice to the principle of the Father's "monarchy", which is so important to Eastern triadology, then the theological fears of Easterners about the filioque would seem to be fully relieved. Consequently, Eastern theologians could accept virtually any of the Memorandum's alternate formulae in the place of the filioque on the basis of the above positive evaluation of the filioque which is in harmony with Maximos the Confessor's interpretation of it. As Zizioulas incisively concludes: The "golden rule" must be Maximos the Confessor's explanation concerning Western pneumatology: by professing the filioque our Western brethren do not wish to introduce another αἴτον in God's being except the Father, and a mediating role of the Son in the origination of the Spirit is not to be limited to the divine Economy, but relates also to the divine οὐσία.) The Pontifical Council for Promoting Christian Unity (PCPCU) also stated that not only the Eastern tradition, but also the Latin Filioque tradition "recognize that the 'Monarchy of the Father' implies that the Father is the sole Trinitarian Cause (αἰτία) or Principle (principium) of the Son and of the Holy Spirit".

The Catholic Church recognizes that, in the Greek language, the term used in the Niceno-Constantinopolitan Creed (ἐκπορευόμενον, "proceeding") to signify the proceeding of the Holy Spirit cannot appropriately be used with regard to the Son, but only with regard to the Father, a difficulty that does not exist in other languages. For this reason, even in the liturgy of Latin Church Catholics, it does not add the phrase corresponding to Filioque (καὶ τοῦ Υἱοῦ) to the Greek language text of the Creed containing the word ἐκπορευόμενον. Even in languages other than Greek, it encourages Eastern Catholic Churches to omit the Filioque from their recitation of the Niceno-Constantinopolitan Creed, even in Eastern Catholic liturgies that previously included it. However, the Eastern Catholic Churches theologically affirm the Filioque as a Catholic dogma, just like all Catholic dogmas.

=== Lutheranism ===
Traditionally, the Lutheran Churches, especially those of Western Christendom, affirm and employ the Filioque in the Nicene Creed. The Eastern Lutheran Churches do not typically make use of the Filioque in the recitation of the Nicene Creed.

Through ecumenical dialogue with the Eastern Orthodox Churches, the Lutheran World Federation recommended: "we suggest that the translation of the Greek original (without the Filioque) be used in the hope that this will contribute to the healing of age-old divisions between our communities and enable us to confess together the faith of the Ecumenical Councils of Nicaea (325) and Constantinople (381)."

=== Anglicanism ===
The 1978 and 1988 Lambeth Conferences advised the Anglican Communion to omit printing the Filioque in the Niceno-Constantinopolitan Creed. In 1993, a joint meeting of the Anglican Primates and Anglican Consultative Council, passed a resolution urging Anglican churches to comply with the request to print the liturgical Niceno-Constantinopolitan Creed without the Filioque clause. The recommendation was not specifically renewed in the 1998 and 2008 Lambeth Conferences and has not been implemented.

In 1985 the General Convention of The Episcopal Church (USA) recommended that the Filioque clause should be removed from the Niceno-Constantinopolitan Creed, if this were endorsed by the 1988 Lambeth Council. Accordingly, at its 1994 General Convention, the Episcopal Church reaffirmed its intention to remove the Filioque clause from the Niceno-Constantinopolitan Creed in the next revision of its Book of Common Prayer. The Episcopal Book of Common Prayer was last revised in 1979, and has not been revised since the resolution.

The Scottish Episcopal Church does not print the Filioque clause in its modern language liturgy (published 1982), though previous liturgies from 1929 and 1970 which have the Filioque remain authorised. The 1987 revision of the Scottish Liturgy of 1970 did not remove the Filioque clause, although it had already been omitted from the 1982 liturgy, promulgated five years earlier.

=== Moravianism ===
The Moravian Church has never used the Filioque.

The confession of The Easter Litany of the Moravian Church of 1749 states: "I believe in the Holy Ghost, who proceedeth from the Father, and whom our Lord Jesus Christ sent after he went away, that he should abide with us forever.

=== Eastern Orthodoxy ===
There has never been a specific conciliar statement in the Orthodox Church which defined the filioque as heresy.

The Eastern Orthodox interpretation is that the Holy Spirit originates, has his cause for existence or being (manner of existence) from the Father alone as "One God, One Father", Lossky insisted that any notion of a double procession of the Holy Spirit from both the Father and the Son was incompatible with Eastern Orthodox theology. For Lossky, this incompatibility was so fundamental that "whether we like it or not, the question of the procession of the Holy Spirit has been the sole dogmatic grounds of the separation of East and West". Eastern Orthodox scholars who share Lossky's view include Dumitru Stăniloae, John Romanides, Christos Yannaras, and Michael Pomazansky. Sergei Bulgakov, however, was of the opinion that the Filioque did not represent an insurmountable obstacle to reunion of the Eastern Orthodox and Roman Catholic churches.

==== Views of Eastern Orthodox saints ====
Although Maximus the Confessor declared that it was wrong to condemn the Latins for speaking of the procession of the Holy Spirit from the Father and the Son, the addition of the Filioque to the Niceno-Constantinopolitan Creed was condemned as heretical by other saints of the Eastern Orthodox Church, including Photius the Great, Gregory Palamas and Mark of Ephesus, sometimes referred to as the Three Pillars of Orthodoxy. However, the statement "The Holy Spirit proceeds from the Father and the Son" can be understood in an orthodox sense if it is clear from the context that "procession from the Son" refers to the sending forth of the Spirit in time, not to an eternal, double procession within the Trinity itself which gives the Holy Spirit existence or being. Hence, in Eastern Orthodox thought, Maximus the Confessor justified the Western use of the Filioque in a context other than that of the Niceno-Constantinopolitan Creed. (Note: Pomazansky wrote that "Maximus the Confessor ... justified [the Westerners] by saying that by the words 'from the Son' [the Westerners] intended to indicate that the Holy Spirit is given to creatures through the Son, that He is manifested, that He is sent — but not that the Holy Spirit has His existence from Him.") and "defended [the Filioque] as a legitimate variation of the Eastern formula that the Spirit proceeds from the Father through the Son". Saint Theophylact of Ohrid likewise maintained that the difference was linguistic in nature and not really theological, urging a spirit of conciliation on both sides over a matter of customs.

...it is said not that [the Holy Spirit] has existence from the Son or through the Son, but rather that [the Holy Spirit] proceeds from the Father and has the same nature as the Son, is in fact the Spirit of the Son as being One in Essence with Him.

— Theodoret of Cyrus, On the Third Ecumenical Council

According to Metropolitan Hierotheos (Vlachos) of Nafpaktos, an Eastern Orthodox tradition is that Gregory of Nyssa composed the section of the Niceno-Constantinopolitan Creed referring to the Holy Spirit adopted by the Second Ecumenical Council at Constantinople in 381. (Note: In icons of the Second Ecumenical Council, St. Gregory is presented as the recording clerk of the Synod, "and, as is believed, was the one who gave the final form to the Niceno-Constantinopolitan Creed and formulated the article about the Holy Spirit: 'And in the Holy Spirit, the Lord, the giver of life; Who proceedeth from the Father; Who with the Father and the Son is worshipped and glorified, Who spake by the Prophets'".) Siecienski doubts that Gregory of Nyssa would have endorsed the addition of the Filioque, as later understood in the West, into the Creed, notwithstanding that Gregory of Nyssa reasoned "there is an eternal, and not simply economic, relationship of the Spirit to the Son".

==== Eastern Orthodox view of Roman Catholic theology ====
Eastern Orthodox theologians (e.g. Pomazansky) say that the Nicene Creed as a Symbol of Faith, as dogma, is to address and define church theology specifically the Orthodox Trinitarian understanding of God. In the hypostases of God as correctly expressed against the teachings considered outside the church. The Father hypostasis of the Nicene Creed is the origin of all. Eastern Orthodox theologians have stated that New Testament passages (often quoted by the Latins) speak of the economy rather than the ontology of the Holy Spirit, and that in order to resolve this conflict Western theologians made further doctrinal changes, including declaring all persons of the Trinity to originate in the essence of God (the heresy of Sabellianism). Eastern Orthodox theologians see this as teaching of philosophical speculation rather than from actual experience of God via theoria.

The Father is the eternal, infinite and uncreated reality, that the Christ and the Holy Spirit are also eternal, infinite and uncreated, in that their origin is not in the ousia of God, but that their origin is in the hypostasis of God called the Father. The double procession of the Holy Spirit bears some resemblance (Note: Photius states in section 32 "And again, if the Spirit proceeds from the Father, and the Son likewise is begotten of the Father, then it is in precisely this fact that the Father's personal property is discerned. But if the Son is begotten and the Spirit proceed from the Son (as this delirium of theirs would have it) then the Spirit of the Father is distinguished by more personal properties than the Son of the Father: on the one hand as proceeding from the equality of the Son and the Spirit, the Spirit is further differentiated by the two distinctions brought about by the dual procession, then the Spirit is not only differentiated by more distinctions than the Son of the Father, but the Son is closer to the Father's essence. And this is so precisely because the Spirit is distinguished by two specific properties. Therefore He is inferior to the Son, Who in turn is of the same nature as the Father! Thus the Spirit's equal dignity is blasphemed, once again giving rise to the Macedonian insanity against the Spirit.") to the teachings of Macedonius I of Constantinople and his sect called the Pneumatomachians in that the Holy Spirit is created by the Son and a servant of the Father and the Son. It was Macedonius' position that caused the specific wording of the section on the Holy Spirit by St Gregory of Nyssa in the finalized Nicene Creed. (Note: "However, the chief of the heretics who distorted the apostolic teaching concerning the Holy Spirit was" Macedonius I of Constantinople, in the 4th century, who found followers "among former Arians and Semi-Arians. He called the Holy Spirit a creation of the Son, and a servant of the Father and the Son. Accusers of his heresy were" Church Fathers like Basil of Caesarea, Gregory of Nazianzus, Athanasius of Alexandria, Gregory of Nyssa, Ambrose, Amphilochius of Iconium, Diodorus of Tarsus, "and others, who wrote works against the heretics. The false teaching of Macedonius was refuted first in a series of local councils and finally at" Constantinople I. "In preserving Orthodoxy," Nicaea I completed the Nicaean Symbol of Faith "with these words: 'And in the Holy Spirit, the Lord, the Giver of Life, Who proceedeth from the Father, Who with the Father and the Son is equally worshiped and glorified, Who spake by the Prophets', as well as those articles of the Creed which follow this in the Nicaean-Constantinopolitan Symbol of Faith.")

The following are some Roman Catholic dogmatic declarations of the Filioque which are in contention with Eastern Orthodoxy:

1. The Fourth Council of the Lateran (1215): "The Father is from no one, the Son from the Father only, and the Holy Spirit equally from both."
2. The Second Council of Lyon, session 2 (1274): "[We confess faithfully and devoutly that] the Holy Spirit proceeds eternally from Father and Son, not as from two principles, but as from one, not by two spirations, but by one only."
3. The Council of Florence, session 6 (1439): "We declare that when holy doctors and fathers say that the Holy Spirit proceeds from the Father through the Son, this bears the sense that thereby also the Son should be signified, according to the Greeks indeed as cause, and according to the Latins as principle of the subsistence of the Holy Spirit, just like the Father."
4. The Council of Florence, session 8 in Laetentur Caeli (1439), on union with the Greeks: "The Holy Spirit is eternally from Father and Son; He has his nature and subsistence at once (simul) from the Father and the Son. He proceeds eternally from both as from one principle and through one spiration. ... And, since the Father has through generation given to the only-begotten Son everything that belongs to the Father, except being Father, the Son has also eternally from the Father, from whom he is eternally born, that the Holy Spirit proceeds from the Son."
5. The Council of Florence, session 11 (1442), in Cantate Domino, on union with the Copts and Ethiopians: "Father, Son and Holy Spirit; one in essence, three in persons; unbegotten Father, Son begotten from the Father, holy Spirit proceeding from the Father and the Son; ... the Holy Spirit alone proceeds at once from the Father and the Son. ... Whatever the Holy Spirit is or has, he has from the Father together with the Son. But the Father and the Son are not two principles of the Holy Spirit, but one principle, just as the Father and the Son and the Holy Spirit are not three principles of creation but one principle."
6. In particular the condemnation, made at the Second Council of Lyons, session 2 (1274), of those "who [presume to] deny that the Holy Spirit proceeds eternally from the Father and the Son or who [rashly dare to] assert that the Holy Spirit proceeds from the Father and the Son as from two principles, not from one."

In the judgment of these Orthodox, the Roman Catholic Church is in fact teaching as a matter of Roman Catholic dogma that the Holy Spirit derives his origin and being (equally) from both the Father and the Son, making the Filioque a double procession. (Note: Lossky wrote: "If the Holy Spirit proceeds from the Father alone, as the hypostatic cause of the consubstantial hypostases, we find the 'simple Trinity', where the monarchy of the Father conditions the personal diversity of the Three while at the same time expressing their essential unity.")

They perceive the West as teaching through more than one type of theological Filioque a different origin and cause of the Holy Spirit; that through the dogmatic Roman Catholic Filioque the Holy Spirit is subordinate to the Father and the Son and not a free, independent and equal to the Father hypostasis that receives his uncreatedness from the origin of all things, the Father hypostasis. Trinity expresses the idea of message, messenger and revealer, or mind, word and meaning. Eastern Orthodox Christians believe in one God the Father, whose person is uncaused and unoriginate, who, because He is love and communion, always exists with His Word and Spirit. (Note: In the Byzantine period the Orthodox side accused the Latin speaking Christians, who supported the Filioque, of introducing two Gods, precisely because they believed that the Filioque implied two causes – not simply two sources or principles – in the Holy Trinity. The Greek Patristic tradition, at least since the Cappadocian Fathers identified God with the person of the Father, whereas, Augustine seems to identify him with the one divine substance (the deitas or divinitas). (Note: Gregory Palamas asserted, in 1351, "that the Holy Spirit 'has the Father as foundation, source, and cause', but 'reposes in the Son' and 'is sent – that is, manifested – through the Son'. (ibid. 194) In terms of the transcendent divine energy, although not in terms of substance or hypostatic being, 'the Spirit pours itself out from the Father through the Son, and, if you like, from the Son over all those worthy of it', a communication which may even be broadly called 'procession' (ekporeusis)."))

==== Eastern Orthodox theology ====
In Eastern Orthodox Christianity theology starts with the Father hypostasis, not the essence of God, since the Father is the God of the Old Testament. The Father is the origin of all things and this is the basis and starting point of the Orthodox trinitarian teaching of one God in Father, one God, of the essence of the Father (as the uncreated comes from the Father as this is what the Father is). In Eastern Orthodox theology, God's uncreatedness or being or essence in Greek is called ousia. Jesus Christ is the Son (God Man) of the uncreated Father (God). The Holy Spirit is the Spirit of the uncreated Father (God).

God has existences (hypostases) of being; this concept is translated as the word "person" in the West. Each hypostasis of God is a specific and unique existence of God. Each has the same essence (coming from the origin, without origin, Father (God) they are uncreated). Each specific quality that constitutes an hypostasis of God, is non-reductionist and not shared. The issue of ontology or being of the Holy Spirit is also complicated by the Filioque in that the Christology and uniqueness of the hypostasis of Jesus Christ would factor into the manifestation of the Holy Spirit. In that Jesus is both God and Man, which fundamentally changes the hypostasis or being of the Holy Spirit, as Christ would be giving to the Holy Spirit an origin or being that was both God the Father (Uncreated) and Man (createdness).

The immanence of the Trinity that was defined in the finalized Nicene Creed. The economy of God, as God expresses himself in reality (his energies) was not what the Creed addressed directly. The specifics of God's interrelationships of his existences, are not defined within the Nicene Creed. The attempt to use the Creed to explain God's energies by reducing God existences to mere energies (actualities, activities, potentials) could be perceived as the heresy of semi-Sabellianism by advocates of Personalism, according to Meyendorff. Eastern Orthodox theologians have complained about this problem in the Roman Catholic dogmatic teaching of actus purus.

==== Modern theology ====
Modern Orthodox theological scholarship is split, according to William La Due, between a group of scholars that hold to a "strict traditionalism going back to Photius" and other scholars "not so adamantly opposed to the filioque". The "strict traditionalist" camp is exemplified by the stance of Lossky who insisted that any notion of a double procession of the Holy Spirit from both the Father and the Son was incompatible with Orthodox theology. For Lossky, this incompatibility was so fundamental that, "whether we like it or not, the question of the procession of the Holy Spirit has been the sole dogmatic grounds of the separation of East and West". Bulgakov, however, was of the opinion that the Filioque did not represent an insurmountable obstacle to reunion of the Eastern Orthodox and Roman Catholic churches, an opinion shared by Vasily Bolotov.

Not all Orthodox theologians share the view taken by Lossky, Stăniloae, Romanides and Pomazansky, who condemn the Filioque. Kallistos Ware considers this the "rigorist" position within the Orthodox Church. Ware states that a more "liberal" position on this issue "was the view of the Greeks who signed the act of union at Florence. It is a view also held by many Orthodox at the present time". He writes that "according to the 'liberal' view, the Greek and the Latin doctrines on the procession of the Holy Spirit may both alike be regarded as theologically defensible. The Greeks affirm that the Spirit proceeds from the Father through the Son, the Latins that He proceeds from the Father and from the Son; but when applied to the relationship between Son and Spirit, these two prepositions 'through' and 'from' amount to the same thing." The Encyclopedia of Christian Theology lists Bolotov, Paul Evdokimov, I. Voronov and S. Bulgakov as seeing the Filioque as a permissible theological opinion or "theologoumenon". Bolotov defined theologoumena as theological opinions "of those who for every catholic are more than just theologians: they are the theological opinions of the holy fathers of the one undivided church", opinions that Bolotov rated highly but that he sharply distinguished from dogmas.

Bulgakov wrote, in The Comforter, that:

It is a difference of theological opinions which was dogmatized prematurely and erroneously. There is no dogma of the relation of the Holy Spirit to the Son and therefore particular opinions on this subject are not heresies but merely dogmatic hypotheses, which have been transformed into heresies by the schismatic spirit that has established itself in the Church and that eagerly exploits all sorts of liturgical and even cultural differences.

Karl Barth considered that the view prevailing in Eastern Orthodoxy was that of Bolotov, who pointed out that the Creed does not deny the Filioque and who concluded that the question had not caused the division and could not constitute an absolute obstacle to intercommunion between the Eastern Orthodox and the Old Catholic Church. David Guretzki wrote, in 2009, that Bolotov's view is becoming more prevalent among Orthodox theologians; and he quotes Orthodox theologian Theodore Stylianopoulos as arguing that "the theological use of the filioque in the West against Arian subordinationism is fully valid according to the theological criteria of the Eastern tradition".

Yves Congar stated in 1954 that "the greater number of the Orthodox say that the Filioque is not a heresy or even a dogmatic error but an admissible theological opinion, a 'theologoumenon'"; and he cited 12th century bishop Nicetas of Nicomedia; 19th century philosopher Vladimir Solovyov; and 20th century writers Bolotov, Florovsky, and Bulgakov.

=== Oriental Orthodox Churches ===
All Oriental Orthodox Churches (Coptic, Syriac, Armenian, Ethiopian, Eritrean, Malankaran) use the original Nicene-Constantinopolitan Creed, without the Filioque clause.

=== Church of the East ===
Two of the present-day churches derived from the Church of the East, the Assyrian Church of the East and the Ancient Church of the East, do not use "and the Son" when reciting the Nicene Creed. A third, the Chaldean Catholic Church, a sui iuris Eastern Catholic Church, in 2007 at the request of the Holy See, removed "and the Son" from its version of the Nicene Creed.

== Recent theological perspectives ==
=== Linguistic issues ===
Ware suggests that the problem is of semantics rather than of basic doctrinal differences. The English Language Liturgical Consultation commented that "those who strongly favour retention of the Filioque are often thinking of the Trinity as revealed and active in human affairs, whereas the original Greek text is concerned about relationships within the Godhead itself. As with many historic disputes, the two parties may not be discussing the same thing."

In 1995, the PCPCU pointed out an important difference in meaning between the Greek verb ἐκπορεύεσθαι and the Latin verb procedere, both of which are commonly translated as "proceed". It stated that the Greek verb ἐκπορεύεσθαι indicates that the Spirit "takes his origin from the Father ... in a principal, proper and immediate manner", while the Latin verb, which corresponds rather to the verb προϊέναι in Greek, can be applied to proceeding even from a mediate channel. Therefore, ἐκπορευόμενον ("who proceeds"), used in the Niceno-Constantinopolitan Creed to signify the proceeding of the Holy Spirit, cannot be appropriately used in the Greek language with regard to the Son, but only with regard to the Father, a difficulty that does not exist in Latin and other languages.

Metropolitan John Zizioulas, while maintaining the explicit Orthodox position of the Father as the single origin and source of the Holy Spirit, declared that PCPCU (1995) shows positive signs of reconciliation. Zizioulas states: "Closely related to the question of the single cause is the problem of the exact meaning of the Son's involvement in the procession of the Spirit. Gregory of Nyssa explicitly admits a 'mediating' role of the Son in the procession of the Spirit from the Father. Is this role to be expressed with the help of the preposition δία (through) the Son (εκ Πατρός δι'Υιού), as Maximus and other Patristic sources seem to suggest?" Zizioulas continues: "The Vatican statement notes that this is 'the basis that must serve for the continuation of the current theological dialogue between Catholic and Orthodox'. I would agree with this, adding that the discussion should take place in the light of the 'single cause' principle to which I have just referred." Zizioulas adds that this "constitutes an encouraging attempt to clarify the basic aspects of the 'Filioque' problem and show that a rapprochement between West and East on this matter is eventually possible".

=== Some Orthodox reconsideration of the Filioque ===
Russian theologian Boris Bolotov asserted in 1898 that the Filioque, like Photius's "from the Father alone", was a permissible theological opinion (a theologoumenon, not a dogma) that cannot be an absolute impediment to reestablishment of communion. Bolotov's thesis was supported by Orthodox theologians Bulgakov, Paul Evdokimov and I. Voronov, but was rejected by Lossky.

In 1986, Theodore Stylianopoulos provided an extensive, scholarly overview of the contemporary discussion. Ware said that he had changed his mind and had concluded that "the problem is more in the area of semantics and different emphases than in any basic doctrinal differences": "the Holy Spirit proceeds from the Father alone" and "the Holy Spirit proceeds from the Father and the Son" may both have orthodox meanings if the words translated "proceeds" actually have different meanings. For some Orthodox, then, the Filioque, while still a matter of conflict, would not impede full communion of the Roman Catholic and Orthodox Churches if other issues were resolved. But 19th century Russian Slavophile theologian Aleksey Khomyakov considered the Filioque as an expression of formalism, rationalism, pride and lack of love for other Christians, (Note: Lossky wrote that for Khomyakov, "legal formalism and logical rationalism of the Roman Catholic Church have their roots in the Roman State. These features developed in it more strongly than ever when the Western Church without consent of the Eastern introduced into the Nicean Creed the filioque clause. Such arbitrary change of the creed is an expression of pride and lack of love for one's brethren in the faith. 'In order not to be regarded as a schism by the Church, Romanism was forced to ascribe to the bishop of Rome absolute infallibility.' In this way Catholicism broke away from the Church as a whole and became an organization based upon external authority. Its unity is similar to the unity of the state: it is not super-rational but rationalistic and legally formal. Rationalism has led to the doctrine of the works of superarogation, established a balance of duties and merits between God and man, weighing in the scales sins and prayers, trespasses and deeds of expiation; it adopted the idea of transferring one person's debts or credits to another and legalized the exchange of assumed merits; in short, it introduced into the sanctuary of faith the mechanism of a banking house.") and that it is in flagrant contravention of the words of Christ in the Gospel, has been specifically condemned by the Orthodox Church, and remains a fundamental heretical teaching which divides East and West.

Romanides too, while personally opposing the Filioque, stated that Constantinople I was not ever interpreted "as a condemnation" of the doctrine "outside the Creed, since it did not teach that the Son is 'cause' or 'co-cause' of the existence of the Holy Spirit. This could not be added to the Creed where 'procession' means 'cause' of existence of the Holy Spirit."

=== Inclusion in the Nicene Creed ===
Eastern Orthodox Christians object that, even if the teaching of the Filioque can be defended, its medieval interpretation and unilateral interpolation into the Creed is anti-canonical and unacceptable. "The Catholic Church acknowledges the conciliar, ecumenical, normative and irrevocable value, as expression of the one common faith of the Church and of all Christians, of the Symbol professed in Greek at Constantinople in 381 by the Second Ecumenical Council. No profession of faith peculiar to a particular liturgical tradition can contradict this expression of the faith taught and professed by the undivided Church." The Catholic Church allows liturgical use of the Apostles' Creed as well of the Nicene Creed, and sees no essential difference between the recitation in the liturgy of a creed with orthodox additions and a profession of faith outside the liturgy such that of Patriarch Tarasios of Constantinople, who developed the Nicene Creed with an addition as follows: "the Holy Spirit, the Lord and giver of life, who proceeds from the Father through the Son". It sees the addition of "and the Son" in the context of the Latin qui ex Patre procedit (who proceeds from the Father) as an elucidation of the faith expressed by the Church Fathers, since the verb procedere signifies "the communication of the consubstantial divinity from the Father to the Son and from the Father, through and with the Son, to the Holy Spirit".

Most Oriental Orthodox churches have not added the Filioque to their creeds but the Armenian Apostolic Church has added elucidations to the Nicene Creed. Another change made to the text of the Nicene Creed by both the Latins and the Greeks is to use the singular "I believe" in place of the plural "we believe", while all the Churches of Oriental Orthodoxy, not only the Armenian, but also the Coptic Orthodox Church, the Ethiopian Orthodox Tewahedo Church, the Malankara Orthodox Church, and the Syriac Orthodox Church, have on the contrary preserved the "we believe" of the original text.

=== Focus on Saint Maximus as a point of mutual agreement ===
Recently, theological debate about the Filioque has focused on the writings of Maximus the Confessor. Siecienski writes that "Among the hundreds of figures involved in the Filioque debates throughout the centuries, Maximus the Confessor enjoys a privileged position." During the lengthy proceedings at Ferrara-Florence, the Orthodox delegates presented a text from Maximus the Confessor that they felt could provide the key to resolving the theological differences between East and West.

The PCPCU states that, according to Maximus, the phrase "and from the Son" does not contradict the Holy Spirit's procession from the Father as first origin (ἐκπόρευσις), since it concerns only the Holy Spirit's coming (in the sense of the Latin word processio and Cyril of Alexandria's προϊέναι) from the Son in a way that excludes any idea of subordinationism. (Note: "The Filioque does not concern the ἐκπόρευσις of the Spirit issued from the Father as source of the Trinity," according to PCPCU (1995), "but manifests his προϊέναι (processio) in the consubstantial communion of the Father and the Son, while excluding any possible subordinationist interpretation of the Father's monarchy".)

Orthodox theologian and Metropolitan of Pergamon, John Zizioulas, wrote that for Maximus the Confessor "the Filioque was not heretical because its intention was to denote not the ἐκπορεύεσθαι (ekporeuesthai) but the προϊέναι (proienai) of the Spirit".

Zizioulas also wrote that "Maximus the Confessor insisted, however, in defence of the Roman use of the Filioque, the decisive thing in this defence lies precisely in the point that in using the Filioque the Romans do not imply a "cause" other than the Father. The notion of "cause" seems to be of special significance and importance in the Greek Patristic argument concerning the Filioque. If Roman Catholic theology would be ready to admit that the Son in no way constitutes a "cause" (aition) in the procession of the Spirit, this would bring the two traditions much closer to each other with regard to the Filioque." This is precisely what Maximus said of the Roman view, that "they have shown that they have not made the Son the cause of the Spirit – they know in fact that the Father is the only cause of the Son and the Spirit, the one by begetting and the other by procession".

The PCPCU upholds the monarchy of the Father as the "sole Trinitarian Cause [aitia] or principle [principium] of the Son and the Holy Spirit". While the Council of Florence proposed the equivalency of the two terms "cause" and "principle" and therefore implied that the Son is a cause (aitia) of the subsistence of the Holy Spirit, the PCPCU distinguishes "between what the Greeks mean by 'procession' in the sense of taking origin from, applicable only to the Holy Spirit relative to the Father (ek tou Patros ekporeuomenon), and what the Latins mean by 'procession' as the more common term applicable to both Son and Spirit (ex Patre Filioque procedit; ek tou Patros kai tou Huiou proion). This preserves the monarchy of the Father as the sole origin of the Holy Spirit while simultaneously allowing for an intratrinitarian relation between the Son and Holy Spirit that the document defines as 'signifying the communication of the consubstantial divinity from the Father to the Son and from the Father through and with the Son to the Holy Spirit'."

Roman Catholic theologian Avery Dulles wrote that the Eastern fathers were aware of the currency of the Filioque in the West and did not generally regard it as heretical: Some, such as Maximus the Confessor, "defended it as a legitimate variation of the Eastern formula that the Spirit proceeds from the Father through the Son".

Pomazansky and Romanides hold that Maximus' position does not defend the actual way the Roman Catholic Church justifies and teaches the Filioque as dogma for the whole church. While accepting as a legitimate and complementary expression of the same faith and reality the teaching that the Holy Spirit proceeds from the Father through the Son, Maximus held strictly to the teaching of the Eastern Church that "the Father is the only cause of the Son and the Spirit": (Note: Siecienski 2010, p. 90 "Adhering to the Eastern tradition, John affirmed (as Maximus had a century earlier) that 'the Father alone is cause [αἴτιος]' of both the Son and the Spirit, and thus 'we do not say that the Son is a cause or a father, but we do say that He is from the Father and is the Son of the Father'.") and wrote a special treatise about this dogma. The Roman Catholic Church cites Maximus as in full accord with the teaching on the Filioque that it proposes for the whole Church as a dogma that is in harmony with the formula "from the Father through the Son", for he explained that, by ekporeusis, "the Father is the sole cause of the Son and the Spirit", but that, by proienai, the Greek verb corresponding to procedere (proceed) in Latin, the Spirit comes through the Son. Later again the Council of Florence, in 1438, declared that the Greek formula "from the Father through the Son" was equivalent to the Latin "from the Father and the Son", not contradictory, and that those who used the two formulas "were aiming at the same meaning in different words".

=== Per Filium ===
Recently, some Orthodox theologians have proposed the substitution of the formula ex Patre per Filium / εκ του Πατρός δια του Υιού (from the Father through the Son) instead of ex Patre Filioque (from the Father and the Son).

== Recent attempts at reconciliation ==
Starting in the latter half of the nineteenth century, ecumenical efforts have gradually developed more nuanced understandings of the issues underlying the Filioque controversy and worked to remove them as an obstruction to Christian unity. Lossky insists that the Filioque is so fundamentally incompatible with Orthodox Christianity as to be the central issue dividing the two churches. (Note: Lossky wrote that "Whether we like it or not, the question of the procession of the Holy Spirit has been the sole dogmatic grounds for the separation of East and West. All the other divergences which, historically, accompanied or followed the first dogmatic controversy about the Filioque, in the measure in which they too had some dogmatic importance, are more or less dependent upon that original issue. ... If other questions have arisen and taken the first place in more recent inter-confessional debates, that is chiefly because the dogmatic plane on which the thought of theologians operates is no longer the same as it was in the medieval period.")

Western churches have arrived at the position that, although the Filioque is doctrinally sound, the way that it was inserted into the Nicene Creed has created an unnecessary obstacle to ecumenical dialogue. Thus, without abandoning the Filioque, some Western churches have come to accept that it could be omitted from the Creed without violating any core theological principles. This accommodation on the part of Western Churches has the objective of allowing both East and West to once again share a common understanding of the Creed as the traditional and fundamental statement of the Christian faith.

=== Catholic Church ===
Popes John Paul II, Benedict XVI, and Leo XIV have recited the Nicene Creed jointly with Patriarchs Demetrius I and Bartholomew I in Greek without the Filioque clause.

=== Old Catholic Church ===
Immediately after the Old Catholic Church separated from the Catholic Church in 1871, its theologians initiated contact with the Orthodox Church. In 1874–75, representatives of the two churches held "union conferences" in Bonn with theologians of the Anglican Communion and the Lutheran Church in attendance in an unofficial capacity. The conferences discussed a number of issues including the filioque controversy. From the outset, Old Catholic theologians agreed with the Orthodox position that the Filioque had been introduced in the West in an unacceptable and non-canonical way. It was at these Bonn conferences that the Old Catholics became the first Western church to omit the Filioque from the Nicene Creed.

=== Anglican Communion ===
Three Lambeth Conferences (1888, 1978 and 1988) have recommended that the Filioque be dropped from the Nicene Creed by churches that belong to the Anglican Communion.

The 1930 Lambeth Conference initiated formal theological dialogue between representatives of the Anglican and Orthodox churches. In 1976, the Agreed Statement of the Anglican-Orthodox Joint Doctrinal Commission recommended that the Filioque should be omitted from the Creed because its inclusion had been effected without the authority of an Ecumenical Council.

In 1994, the General Convention of the Episcopal Church (US) resolved that the Filioque should be deleted from the Nicene Creed in the next edition of the Prayer Book. The enthronement ceremonies of four recent archbishops of Canterbury (Robert Runcie, George Carey, Rowan Williams, Justin Welby) included recitations of the Nicene Creed that omitted the Filioque; this has been considered to have been "a gesture of friendship toward Orthodox guests and their Communions".

At the end of October 2017 theologians from the Anglican Communion and Oriental Orthodox Churches signed an agreement on the Holy Spirit. This is the culmination of discussions which began in 2015. The statement of agreement confirms the omission of the Filioque clause.

=== World Council of Churches ===
In 1979, a study group of the World Council of Churches examined the Filioque question and recommended that "the original form of the Creed, without the Filioque, should everywhere be recognized as the normative one and restored, so that the whole Christian people may be able ... to confess their common faith in the Holy Spirit". However, nearly a decade later, the WCC lamented that very few member churches had implemented this recommendation.

=== Joint statement of Catholic and Eastern Orthodox theologians ===
The Filioque was discussed at the 62nd meeting of the North American Orthodox–Catholic Theological Consultation, in 2002. As a result of these contemporary discussions between both churches, it has been suggested that the orthodox could accept an "economic" filioque that states that the Holy Spirit, who originates in the Father alone, was sent to the Church "through the Son" (as the Paraclete), but it would not be the official orthodox doctrine, but what the Fathers called a theologoumenon, a theological opinion.

In October 2003, the Consultation issued an agreed statement, The Filioque: a Church-dividing issue?, which provides an extensive review of Scripture, history, and theology. The recommendations include:

1. That all involved in such dialogue expressly recognize the limitations of our ability to make definitive assertions about the inner life of God.
2. That, in the future, because of the progress in mutual understanding that has come about in recent decades, Orthodox and Catholics refrain from labeling as heretical the traditions of the other side on the subject of the procession of the Holy Spirit.
3. That Orthodox and Catholic theologians distinguish more clearly between the divinity and hypostatic identity of the Holy Spirit (which is a received dogma of our Churches) and the manner of the Spirit's origin, which still awaits full and final ecumenical resolution.
4. That those engaged in dialogue on this issue distinguish, as far as possible, the theological issues of the origin of the Holy Spirit from the ecclesiological issues of primacy and doctrinal authority in the Church, even as we pursue both questions seriously, together.
5. That the theological dialogue between our Churches also give careful consideration to the status of later councils held in both our Churches after those seven generally received as ecumenical.
6. That the Catholic Church, as a consequence of the normative and irrevocable dogmatic value of the Creed of 381, use the original Greek text alone in making translations of that Creed for catechetical and liturgical use.
7. That the Catholic Church, following a growing theological consensus, and in particular the statements made by Pope Paul VI, declare that the condemnation made at the Second Council of Lyons (1274) of those "who presume to deny that the Holy Spirit proceeds eternally from the Father and the Son" is no longer applicable.

In the judgment of the consultation, the question of the Filioque is no longer a "Church-dividing" issue, which would impede full reconciliation and full communion. It is for the bishops of the Catholic and Orthodox Churches to review this work and to make whatever decisions would be appropriate.

=== Lutheran-Orthodox Common Statement on the Filioque ===
In July 2024, within the framework of an official dialogue between Lutheran and Orthodox Churches, a common statement was issued; this acknowledged that "the Filioque was inserted in the Nicene-Constantinopolitan Creed by the Latin Church in response to the heresy of Arianism centuries after the Nicene-Constantinopolitan Creed's composition." It stated that "the reformers inherited the Creed with the Filioque as part of the Latin tradition, and did not consider it problematic." It also suggested that "the translation of the Greek original (without the Filioque) be used in the hope that this will contribute to the healing of age-old divisions".

== Summary ==
The Filioque doctrine was traditional in the West, being declared dogmatically in 447 by Pope Leo I, the Pope whose Tome was approved at the Council of Chalcedon (Note: Leo I, Letter 28 to Flavian (NPNF2 14:254–258)). Its inclusion in the Creed appeared in the anti-Arian situation of 7th-century Spain. However, this dogma was never accepted in the East. The Filioque, included in the Creed by certain anti-Arian councils in Spain, was a means to affirm the full divinity of the Son in relation to both the Father and the Spirit.

A similar anti-Arian emphasis also strongly influenced the development of the liturgy in the East, for example, in promoting prayer to "Christ Our God", an expression which also came to find a place in the West, where, largely as a result of "the Church's reaction to Teutonic Arianism", "'Christ our God' ... gradually assumes precedence over 'Christ our brother'". In this case, a common adversary, namely Arianism, had profound, far-reaching effects, in the orthodox reaction in both East and West.

The doctrine expressed by the phrase in Latin (in which the word "procedit" that is linked with "Filioque" does not have exactly the same meaning and overtones as the word used in Greek) is definitively upheld by the Western Church, having been dogmatically declared by Leo I, and upheld by councils at Lyon and Florence that the Western Church recognizes as ecumenical, by the unanimous witness of the Latin Church Fathers (as Maximus the Confessor acknowledged) and even by Popes who, like Leo III, opposed insertion of the word into the Creed.

That the doctrine is heretical is something that not all Orthodox now insist on. According to Ware, a number of Orthodox (whatever may be the doctrine and practice of the Eastern Orthodox Church itself) hold that, in broad outline, to say the Spirit proceeds from the Father and the Son amounts to the same thing as to say that the Spirit proceeds from the Father through the Son, a view accepted also by the Greeks who signed the act of union at the Council of Florence. For others, such as Bolotov and his disciples, the Filioque can be considered a Western theologoumenon, a theological opinion of Church Fathers that falls short of being a dogma. Bulgakov also stated: "There is no dogma of the relation of the Holy Spirit to the Son and therefore particular opinions on this subject are not heresies but merely dogmatic hypotheses, which have been transformed into heresies by the schismatic spirit that has established itself in the Church and that eagerly exploits all sorts of liturgical and even cultural differences."

== See also ==
- Social trinitarianism
- Divine filiation
