= Baturich =

9th-century Bavarian abbot and bishop

Baturich (died 847), also spelled Baturic or Baturicus, was the abbot of Saint Emmeram's and bishop of Regensburg from 817 until his death.

== Life ==
Baturich studied under Hraban Maur at the abbey of Fulda. He became abbot and bishop simultaneously in 817. In 819, he accompanied the army of Bavaria in the field against the rebel Ljudevit in Lower Pannonia. In May 823, he attended the great council of the Emperor Louis the Pious at Frankfurt.

In 833, when Louis the German became king of all East Francia, he appointed Baturich as his ambasciator, a court officer who relayed the king's commands to the scribes. It was probably at this time that he appointed Baturich his archchaplain, although the earliest reference to this appointment is from 844. He remained Louis's archchaplain until his death. When in 833 the Emperor Louis the Pious was imprisoned by King Lothair, Baturich remained loyal to King Louis and the emperor. That same year, the emperor gave him control of Mondsee Abbey.

Baturich did not accompany the king on his expedition to Italy in 837, but he was with Louis's army during its campaign of 846 against Moravia and its disastrous retreat through Bohemia. He died in 847. He was succeeded by his nephew, Erchanfrid.

== Scriptoria ==
Charlemagne's 792 letter to Elipandus, from a manuscript commissioned by Baturich in 821.

Baturich and Hraban exchanged letters, books, students and even relics. Hraban addressed a poem to Baturich, Ad Baturicum episcopum, while as bishop Baturich looked after Fulda's interests at court. Baturich expanded the libraries of Saint Emmeram's and Regensburg Cathedral and standardized the handwriting of their scriptoria. Some 31 manuscripts survive from his scriptoria. Five of these explicitly identify him as their commissioner.

In 821, Baturich commissioned a dossier of conciliar texts (now Munich, Clm 14468), including texts on the Council of Regensburg (792) against the Adoptionists and the Council of Friuli (796). While attending the council of 823, he had a copy made of Augustine of Hippo's commentary on 1 John (now Munich, Clm 14468). In 826 or early 827, Baturich commissioned a pontifical of prayers and benedictions for the use of the new royal court of Bavaria. It is preserved today in Munich, Clm 14510, folios 1–75. It contains a coronation service that was probably used for the crowning of King Louis the German, who arrived in Bavaria in 826. A Latin charter that can be dated to the 820s lists Baturich among the coronatores viri, "crowning men", of Bavaria.

== Bibliography ==
- Davis, Jennifer R. (2015). Charlemagne's Practice of Empire. Cambridge University Press. ISBN 978-1107076990.
- Dutton, Paul Edward (2017). "The Desert War of a Carolingian Monk". Journal of Medieval and Early Modern Studies. 47 (1): 75–119. doi:10.1215/10829636-3716590.
- Goldberg, Eric J. (2006). Struggle for Empire: Kingship and Conflict under Louis the German, 817–876. Cornell University Press. ISBN 978-0-8014-7529-0.
- Kyle, Joseph D. (1980). "The Monastery Library at St. Emmeram (Regensburg)". The Journal of Library History. 15 (1): 1–21. JSTOR 25541042.
- Wollasch, Joachim (1989). "Des fragments d'un manuscrit inédit du IX^{e} siècle". Bulletin de la Société nationale des Antiquaires de France. 1987: 229–240. doi:10.3406/bsnaf.1989.9316.
