= Synod of Frankfurt =

Synod of Frankfurt may refer to:

- Synod of Frankfurt (794)
- Synod of Frankfurt (1007)
- Synod of Frankfurt (1027)
