= Ascaric (bishop of Braga) =

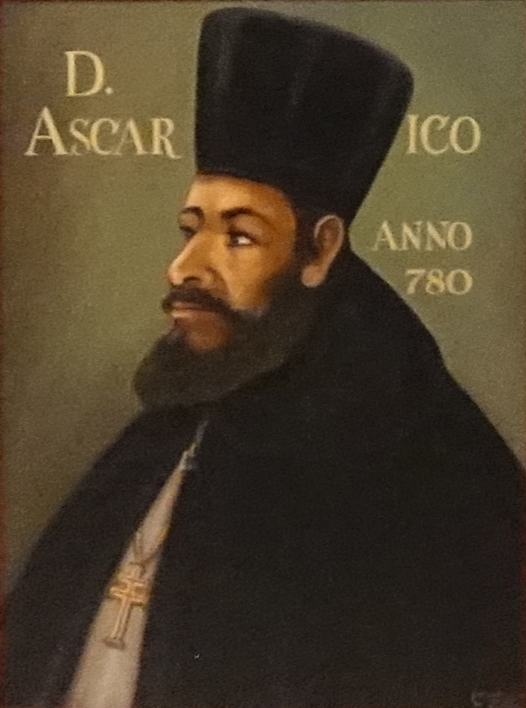
Ascaric of Braga

Ascaric (died 810/11) was either the bishop of Astorga or bishop of Braga. He was condemned in the third letter of Pope Hadrian I for adoptionism sometime between 785 and 791 (probably 786). His Epistula ad Tuseredum ("letter to Tuseredo"), explaining the resurrection of the body, places him in the Kingdom of Asturias at the time. He also penned a poem to Tuseredo, modelling it on the Hamartigenia of Prudentius and the verse of Coelius Sedulius.

== Sources ==
- Collins, Roger. Early Medieval Spain: Unity in Diversity, 400–1000. Macmillan Publishers, 1990.
