= Council of Frankfurt =

Synod in 794

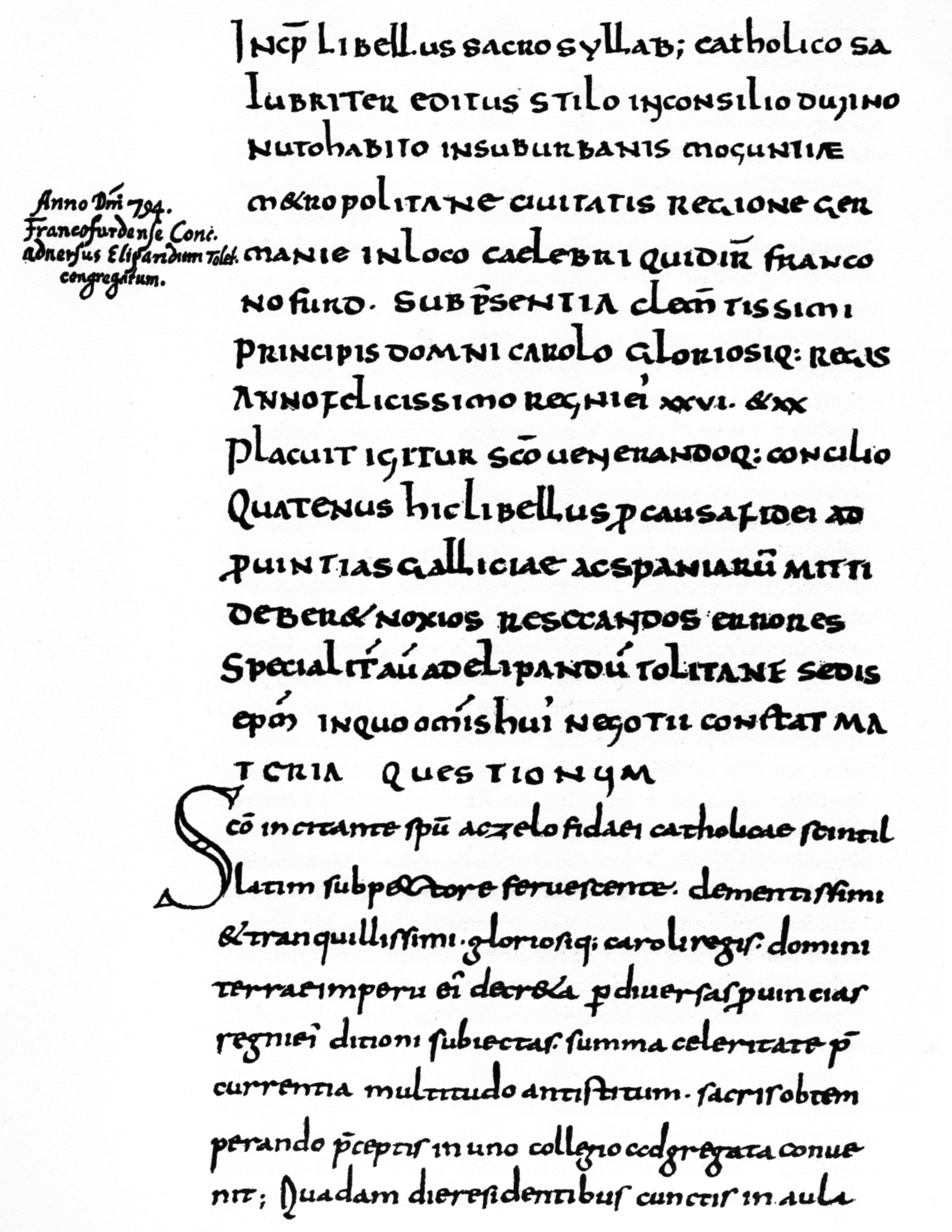
Mention of Frankfurt as Franconofurd in the Sacrosyllabus of Paulinus of Aquileia of 794

The Council of Frankfurt, traditionally also the Council of Frankfort, in 794 was called by Charlemagne, as a meeting of the important churchmen of the Frankish realm. Bishops and priests from Francia, Aquitaine, Italy, and Provence gathered in Franconofurd (now known as Frankfurt am Main). The synod, held in June 794, allowed the discussion and resolution of many central religious and political questions.

The chief concerns of the council were the Frankish response to the Adoptionist movement in Spain and the Second Council of Nicaea (787), which had been held by the Byzantine Empress Irene of Athens and had dealt with iconoclasm and with which Charlemagne took issue because no Frankish churchmen had been invited. Ultimately, the council condemned the Adoptionist heresy and revoked the Nicene Council's decrees regarding holy icons, condemning both iconodulism (veneration of icons) and iconoclasm (destruction of icons), "allowing that images could be useful educational devices, but denying that they were worthy of veneration."

== Participants ==
The participants in the Frankfurt synod included, among others, Paulinus II the Patriarch of Aquileia, Peter, Archbishop of Milan, the Benedictine Abbot Benedict of Aniane, the Abbot Smaragdus of Saint-Mihiel, as well as many bishops of England, Gaul, Aquitaine, the Spanish March, the County of Roussillon, and the lower Languedoc. Theophylactus and Stephen of Rome took part as representatives of Pope Hadrian I and bearers of his epistula dogmatica. The French church historian Émile Amann counts the Council of Frankfurt among the "crucial synods of the whole church"

== Topics and outcomes of the Council ==
The topics and items of discussion at the Council of Frankfurt were gathered together in 56 chapters, covering a number of points of varying theological, political and legal significance. The first five points of this agenda have been granted the greatest historical significance in historical research:

1. Discussion of the Christological teachings of the Adoptionists which had arisen in Spain. This position was notably supported at that time by Elipando, the Archbishop of Toledo and Primate of Spain (717 – c. 800), and by Felix, the Bishop of Urgell, and was condemned as heresy by the council. Both Elipando and Felix had already been censured for this position when it was classed as a false doctrine at the Council of Regensburg (792), but had continued to teach it. In its decision, the Council of 794 made reference to the rulings of previous councils, especially of the Council of Chalcedon (451), which had laid down "the pure teaching of the consubstantiality of the savior" in the patristic tradition. In the course of its condemnation of Adoptionism, the council also touched on the addition of Filioque to the Nicene Creed.
2. Discussion about the Byzantine Iconoclasm. The rulings of the Second Council of Nicaea had brought an end to the iconoclastic controversy between the Popes and the Byzantine emperors. The Council of Frankfurt rejected the rulings of the Second Council of Nicaea. The rejection derived from the loss of prestige Charlemagne had suffered at not being represented at the Second Council of Nicaea, which led him to consider the council unecumenical. The Council of Frankfurt possessed a memorandum about iconodulism, which had been produced previously by Frankish theologians on the order of Charlemagne concerning the Byzantine iconoclastic controversy: the Libri Carolini.

Because the Pope had to take account of Byzantium as well as the Franks in his decisions, he had allowed the rulings of Nicaea to be accepted but only with reservations. In the capitulary summarising the conclusions of the Council of Frankfurt, the rejection of image worship was formulated as "complete" and "unanimous".

1. The final deposition of Tassilo III, the last Agilolfing Duke of Bavaria. The Duke had refused to aid the Frankish king Pippin the Younger in his campaign in Aquitaine in 763 and had thereby broken his allegiance. In 787 he did not attend Charlemagne's Hoftag in Worms. At the following Hoftag in Ingelheim am Rhein in 788, Tassilo was sentenced to death for these crimes – later commuted to withdrawal to a monastery. He was required to come out of sequestration in the French Jumièges Abbey and attend the Council of 794 in order to perform atonement once more. The deposed duke asked Charlemagne for forgiveness for his earlier resistance to him and for his pacts with the Lombards. Tassilo renounced all right to rule and all his property and was sent back to the monastery, where he died in 796. His humiliation at the council of 794 sealed Carolingian control of the stem duchy of Bavaria.
2. Establishment of fixed prices for grain and bread in the Frankish realm to prevent overcharging. This chapter especially stressed the responsibility of all liege lords to ensure that their vassals not suffer from famine.
3. Edict on the Carolingian monetary reform introduced a short time before, declaring this system binding. In the report of the Council of Frankfurt (cf. MGH, Cap. I, p. 74, Synodus Franconofurtensis) it appears that new silver pennies bearing the monogram of Charlemagne were to be minted throughout the realm. Therefore the Carolingian monetary reform and the creation of the Carolingian pound can be dated to the years 793 and 794.

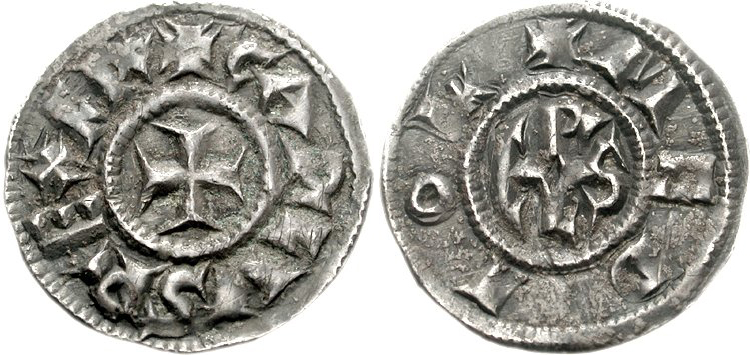
Obverse and reverse of one of the pennies minted by Charlemagne from 793 with Charlemagne's monogram in the centre (right)

The fifty one chapters following these first five dealt, among other things, with synodal decrees for several Spanish bishops on various topics, with a ban on collecting money for entrance to monasteries and other decisions pertaining to ecclesiastical law, as well as with minutiae of tax regulations relating to the collection of the tithe.

The rulings of the Council of 794 were compiled by hand and published in the form of a capitulary written in Medieval Latin. This Capitulary of the Council (also known as the Frankfurt Capitulary) does not survive in the original manuscript, but handwritten copies from the late ninth century as well as the tenth and eleventh centuries are preserved to this day. Two of these are kept in the Bibliothèque Nationale in Paris. They are written in Carolingian minuscule, the script which was developed at the end of the eighth century and in use in the time of Charlemagne. Whether the original manuscript of the Capitulary was also written in this script is not certain; on the basis of the historical development of this script and its use in the Frankish realm, its use in the Capitulary seems likely.

== Miscellaneous ==
- The council took place in a seventh-century building on what was later known as Domhügel (Cathedral hill). This building was a predecessor of the Royal Palace of Frankfurt, which has often been attributed to Charlemagne in the past but was only built by his son Ludwig the Pious around 822. This visit of Charlemagne to Francofurd is the occasion of the first documentary evidence of the city – in a royal charter of the council of the 22nd of February 794 for St. Emmeram's Abbey in Regensburg. In this document, written in Latin, it says actum super fluvium Moin in loco nuncupante Franconofurd ("Done by the river Main in the place named Franconofurd").
- Charlemagne stayed at Frankfurt for about seven months. He used his stay for jurisprudence and the production of theological opinions and papers, and also celebrated Easter there.
- During his stay in Frankfurt, on 10 August 794, Charlemagne's fourth wife Fastrada died. She was buried in St Alban's Abbey in Magontia (later known as Mainz).

== Bibliography ==
- Émile Amann: L’Epoche carolingienne, in: Fliche-Martin: L’Histoire de l’Eglise. Standardwerk zur Kirchengeschichte, Bd. 6, Paris 1941.
- Johannes Fried, Rainer Koch, Lieselotte E. Saurma-Jelsch, Andreas Tiegel (Hrsg.): 794 – Karl der Große in Frankfurt am Main: ein König bei der Arbeit. Publikation zur Ausstellung der Stadt Frankfurt am Main »794 – Karl der Große in Frankfurt«. Jan Thorbecke Verlag, Sigmaringen 1994. ISBN 3-7995-1204-7
- Kurt Krusenberg (Hrsg.), Wolfgang Braunfels: Karl der Große. Erschienen in der Reihe Rowohlts Monographien, Rowohlt Taschenbuch Verlag, rm 187, Reinbek bei Hamburg 1972. ISBN 3-4995-0187-2
- Hans Wolter: Frankfurt am Main als Ort christlich-abendländischer Begegnung. Frankfurt am Main, im Verlag von Waldemar Kramer. Ohne Jahresangabe.
