= Paulinus II of Aquileia =

8th-century clergyman, theologian and writer

Saint Paulinus II
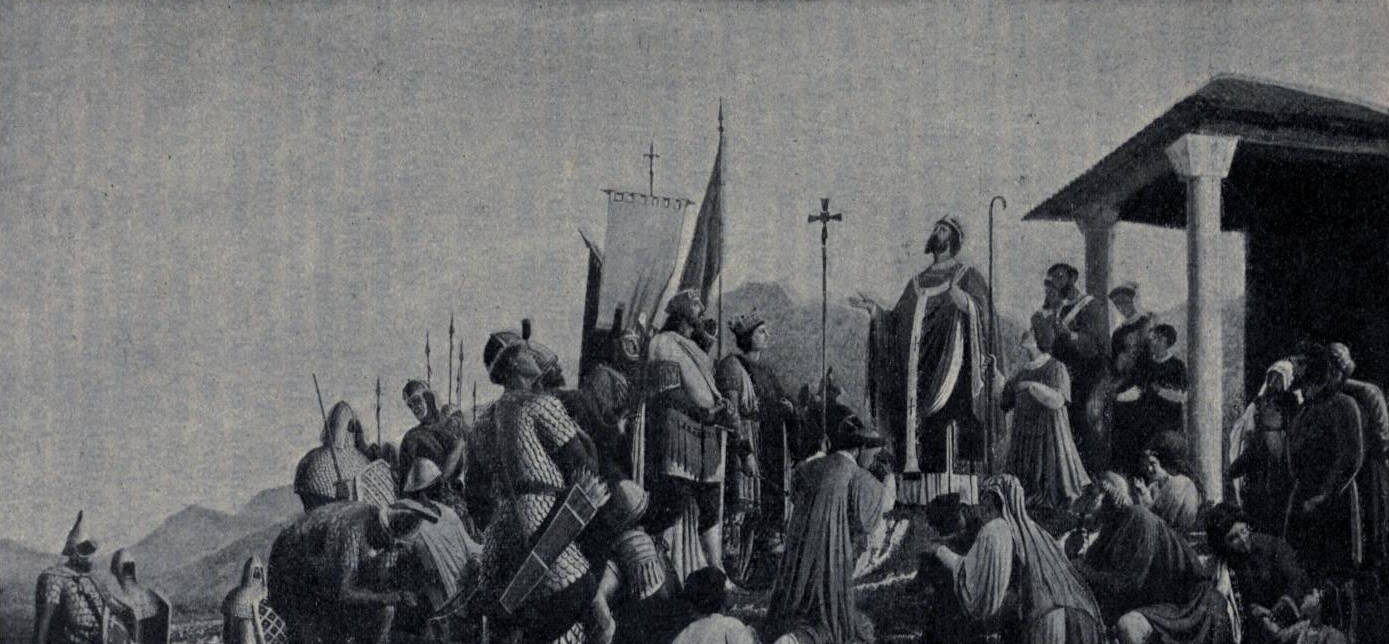
- Paulinus II of Aquileia blessing the Friulian-Slavic army before its campaign against the Avars. Depiction from the Aquileia Cathedral.

Apostle of the Slovenes
- Born: c. 726; Premariacco
- Died: 802 or 804; Cividale
- Venerated in: Catholic Church
- Feast: January 11

Paulinus II of Aquileia (c. 726 – 11 January 802 or 804 AD) was a priest, theologian, poet, and one of the most eminent scholars of the Carolingian Renaissance. From 787 to his death, he was the Patriarch of Aquileia in what is now northeastern Italy. He participated in a number of synods which opposed Spanish Adoptionism and promoted both reforms and the adoption of the Filioque into the Nicene Creed. In addition, Paulinus arranged for the peaceful Christianisation of the Avars and the alpine Slavs in the territory of the Aquileian patriarchate. For this, he is also known as the apostle of the Slovenes.

== Life ==
=== Early life ===
Paulinus was born at Premariacco, near Cividale (the Roman Forum Iulii) in the Friuli region of north-eastern Italy, during the latter days of Lombard rule. He received his education in the patriarchal school at Cividale and, after ordination to the priesthood, he became master of the same school. There he acquired a thorough Latin culture, both in pagan and Christian classics. He also acquired a relatively deep knowledge of jurisprudence, and extensive Scriptural, theological, and patristic training.

=== Carolingian Renaissance ===
Paulinus' educational background prepared him to play a key part in the Carolingian Renaissance, allowing him to capably assist in the promotion of Christendom and the restoration of Western civilization after centuries of unstable barbarian rule.

It was precisely because of his exceptional learning that Paulinus first came to the attention of Charlemagne in 774 when the King of the Franks conquered all of Lombard northern Italy for the Carolingian Empire. Moreover, because of his loyalty to Charlemagne during Duke Hrodgaud's rebellion in 776, Paulinus was rewarded with many favors, among them the gift of the property of Waldand, son of Mimo of Lavariano, by means of a diploma issued by Charlemagne from Ivrea. In the same year, Charlemagne also invited Paulinus to the palace court to be royal "master of grammar" (grammaticus magister). It was at the itinerant palace school (schola palatina) that Paulinus would stay for about ten years and make the acquaintance of other leading scholars of the age, including Peter of Pisa, Alcuin of York, Fardulf, Arno of Salzburg, Albrico, Riculph, Raefgot, Rado, Lullus, Bassinus, Fuldrad, Eginard, Adalard, and Adelbert. He formed an enduring friendship with Alcuin as attested to by numerous letters.

=== Patriarch of Aquileia ===
On the death of Patriarch Siguald in 787, Charles appointed Paulinus to be consecrated as the Patriarch of Aquileia. Paulinus returned from court to his episcopal see and took up residence at Cividale, also the seat of the Carolingian count in charge of the March of Friuli. (Aquileia itself had been reduced to a tiny village after its destruction in 452 by Attila the Hun, although the patriarchal basilica remained there.) As patriarch, Paulinus was able to take a more active and prominent part in implementing societal reforms. In his relations with the churches of Istria, or with the nearby Patriarch of Grado, the representative of Byzantine interests, he exhibited prudence and pastoral zeal. Meanwhile, from Charlemagne, Paulinus obtained diplomas for the free election of the future patriarchs by the cathedral chapter of Aquileia, and other privileges for his patriarchate as well as for the monastery of St. Mary in Organo, the church of St. Lawrence in Buja, and the hospitals of St. John at Cividale and St. Mary at Verona.

== Synods ==
Paulinus was solicitous for the integrity of Catholic doctrine. In 792, he took part in the Council of Ratisbon, which condemned the heresy of Spanish Adoptionism taught by the Spanish bishops Elipandus of Toledo and Felix of Urgell. In 794, he took a leading part in the Frankish national council at Frankfurt, where Adoptionism was again condemned, and composed a book against the heresy which was sent to Spain in the name of the assembled bishops. Departing Frankfort, Paulinus returned to his episcopal residence at Cividale.

In 796 he accompanied Charlemagne's son Pepin in his military campaign against the nearby hostile Avars. In late summer of 796, after the Avars had been defeated, Paulinus presided over a synod of bishops at Pepin's military camp on the banks of the Danube in which the bishops decided on a program of evangelization and catechesis for the recently subdued territories inhabited by the Avars and the Slavs. With the consent of Paulinus, the synod also assigned the patriarchate of Aquileia's northernmost territory to the bishop of Salzburg, headed by Arno. The border between the dioceses was drawn on the Drava River. The agreement was confirmed in 811 by Charlemagne and lasted for almost a millennium, until the middle of the 18th century. At the advice of Alcuin of York, it was decided that the areas should be Christianised nonviolently. Nowadays, the Slovenes regard Paulinus as their apostle who peacefully brought them Christian religion, although the true missionary activity in the Aquileian sphere started only after his death.

Returning from the synod, Paulinus once more opposed Spanish Adoptionism at the Council of Cividale. The patriarch defended the use of the Filioque in the Creed in order to more explicitly contradict Adoptionism, a heresy which taught that Christ was adopted as Son of God when He received the Holy Spirit from the Father at His baptism. The Adoptionist polemic was based on the assumption that the humanity of Christ did not have the natural ability the send the Holy Spirit, but needed to receive this power by being adopted by the Father. For this reason, Paulinus believed that the Filioque was necessary to safeguard Christological orthodoxy. Walafrid Strabo, a contemporary, noted that the Creed (with the Filioque) "began to be repeated in the liturgy of the Mass more widely and frequently after the deposition of Felix the heretic," one of the prominent Adoptionists.

At this synod fourteen canons of ecclesiastical discipline, and on the sacrament of marriage, were framed and a copy of the Acts was sent to Charlemagne. [Paulinus was once thought to have assisted at a Council of Altinum, but the theologian Karl Josef von Hefele has provided evidence that such a council never occurred.]

== Missus dominicus ==
Always protesting the immunity of the Church from secular obligations and interference in his correspondences with Charlemagne, Paulinus, nonetheless, served as one of Charlemagne's missi dominici at Pistoia, with Arno of Salzburg and ten other bishops, in 798. Afterwards he also traveled to Rome as legate to Pope Leo III.

Much of the activity of Paulinus as patriarch can be gathered from the Sponsio Episcoporum ad S. Aquileiensem Sedem.

He died, revered as a saint by the Catholic Church.

== Works ==
Among his works are: Libellus Sacrosyllabus contra Elipandum, Liber Exhortationis, Libri III contra Felicem, and the protocol of the conference with Pepin and the bishops on the Danube, a work very important for the history of that expedition. Among his early works is a Commentary on the Letter to the Hebrews which, however, remains in manuscript form.

Paulinus was also a poet. Among his better known poetical productions are his Carmen de regula fidei; a Versus de Lazaro; a planctus or elegy inspired by the death of his friend, Duke Eric of Friuli who was killed in Siege of Trsat, 799; a rhythm on the destruction of Aquileia; and eight liturgical rhythms or hymns to be sung in his own church at Christmas, the Candlemas, Lent, Easter, the feast of Saint Mark, the feast of Saints Peter and Paul (known by incipit Felix per omnes festum mundi cardines), and the feast of the dedication of his cathedral.

Paulinus may be the author of the Carmen de conversione Saxonum.

Letters written by and to Paulinus are preserved in the Monumenta Germaniae Historica and Patrologia Latina.

== Veneration ==
After several translations the relics of the patriarch were laid to rest under the altar of the crypt of the basilica of Cividale del Friuli.

The first appearance of the name St. Paulinus in the Liturgy occurs in the "Litaniae" of Charles the Bald of the 9th century. It appears also in the "Litaniae Carolinae," in the "Litaniae a S. Patribus constitutae," and finally in the manuscript "Litaniae of the Gertrudian" of the 10th century.

=== Feast day ===
In manuscripts prior to the Martyrology of Usuard his feast day is recorded on 11 January. In the calendars of saints of the 13th, 14th and 15th centuries, used in the Church of Aquileia and Cividale, his feast has a special rubric. Until the 16th century, the feast continued to be celebrated on 11 January, during the privileged octave of the Epiphany. The patriarch Francesco Barbaro at the beginning of the 17th century translated the feast to 9 February. The Church of Cividale keeps his feast on 2 March.

According to the most recent (2004) edition of the Roman Martyrology, Paulinus' feast day is assigned to the date of his death, 11 January.

== See also ==
- Saint Paulinus II of Aquileia, patron saint archive

== Sources ==
- Herbermann, Charles, ed. (1913). "St. Paulinus II, Patriarch of Aquileia" . Catholic Encyclopedia. New York: Robert Appleton Company.
- Martyrologium Romanum, Editio Altera, (Citta del Vaticano: Libreria Editrice Vaticana, 2004) 94.
- History of the Christian Church, Volume IV: Mediaeval Christianity
- Attwater, Donald and Catherine Rachel John. The Penguin Dictionary of Saints. 3rd edition. New York: Penguin Books, 1993. ISBN 0-14-051312-4.
- Nicholas Everett, "Paulinus, the Carolingians and famosissima Aquileia", in Paulino d'Aquileia e il contributo italiano all'Europa carolingia, ed. Paolo Chiesa (Udine, 2003), pp. 115–154
- Nicholas Everett, "Paulinus of Aquileia's Sponsio Episcoporum: written oaths and clerical discipline in Carolingian Italy", in W. Robins (ed), Textual Cultures of Medieval Italy (University of Toronto Press, 2011), pp. 167–216 (includes new edition of Latin text with Eng. translation of the Sponsio).
- Carl Giannoni, Paulinus II, Patriarch von Aquileia, (Wien: Verlag, 1896)
- Dag Norberg, L'oeuvre poétique de Paulin d'Aquilée. Stockholm, 1979 (edition of all poetic texts)

Preceded by Siguald	Patriarch of Aquileia; 787 – 802 or 804	Succeeded by Ursus I
