= Elipandus =

Spanish theologian and archbishop

A letter dated to 792 from Charlemagne to Elipandus concerning Adoptionism, from a manuscript of 821 commissioned by Bishop Baturich.

Elipandus (Note: Sometimes anglicized Elipand; in Spanish, Elipando.) (717–805) was a Spanish theologian and the archbishop of Toledo from 782. He was condemned by the Catholic Church as an Adoptionist.

Six letters written by Elipandus survive, including one to Migetius and another on behalf of the bishops of Spain to the bishops of Francia. All in all, three of his letters address the Migetian controversy. He credited Bishop Ascaric of Braga with also fighting the "Migetians".

Although he affirmed Catholic teaching that Jesus is true Son of God, eternally begotten from God the Father and thus of one divine nature with the Father, he also proposed that Jesus, as the son of David, according to his human nature was the adopted rather than the begotten son of God. Elipandus's assertion seemed to suggest that Christ's human nature existed separately from His divine personhood. Thus, it seemed to be a nuanced form of Nestorianism and came to be known as Adoptionism.

Elipandus's teaching was condemned as heresy by the Councils of Ratisbon in 792 and of Frankfurt in 794. The heresy was rejected by the English theologian Alcuin who wrote, among many other works against adoptionism, a Treatise against Elipandus in four books. Paulinus II of Aquileia also composed a book refuting Elipandus unorthodox teachings for the Council of Frankfort.

== Notes ==
Preceded by Cixila	Archbishop of Toledo; 783-c.808	Succeeded by Gumesind
