= Felix (bishop of Urgell) =

Christian bishop and theologian

Felix (died 818) was a Christian bishop and theologian. He served as bishop of Urgell (783–99) and advocated the christology known as Spanish Adoptionism because it originated in the lands of the former Visigothic Kingdom in Spain. He was condemned for heresy and all his writings were suppressed. They are known today only through quotations contained in the writings of his opponents.

Felix became bishop at an unknown date and lived at the monastery of Sant Sadurní de Tavèrnoles, in the foothills of the Pyrenees. Before coming to prominence for his adoptionist Christology, he wrote an apology for Christianity against Islam, Against the Saracen. This work is now thought to be lost. In 788, Felix attended a provincial synod in the Archdiocese of Narbonne and signed the conciliar acts. A denunciation of Felix was later attached to these acts because of the presence of Felix's name.

In 789 or 790, the city of La Seu d'Urgell surrendered to a Frankish army and Urgell was incorporated into the Frankish kingdom. This separated the bishopric of Urgell politically from the bulk of the Spanish (Visigothic) church, which was still under Islamic rule. About this time Felix came to prominence for his christological teachings, which attracted criticism from the Anglo-Saxon scholar Alcuin of York. Alcuin attests that Spanish Adoptionism was widespread among all social classes in formerly Visigothic areas. In 792, the Frankish king Charlemagne convened a council at Regensburg for the purpose of condemning Felix for heresy. This it did, although the acts of the council have been lost. In response to his condemnation, Felix set out for Rome to formally recant.

The Council of Frankfurt in 794 condemned his teachings as heretical.

He was exiled from Urgell and died in Lyon in 818.
