= Spanish Adoptionism =

Christian theological position

Spanish Adoptionism (or Adoptianism) was a Christian theological position which was articulated in Umayyad and Christian-held regions of the Iberian Peninsula in the 8th and 9th centuries. The issue seems to have begun with the claim of archbishop Elipandus of Toledo that – in respect to his human nature – Jesus Christ was adoptive Son of God. Another leading advocate of this Christology was Felix of Urgell. In Spain, Adoptionism was opposed by Beatus of Liebana, and in the Carolingian territories, the Adoptionist position was condemned by Pope Hadrian I, Alcuin of York, Agobard, and officially in Carolingian territory by the Council of Frankfurt (794).

== Introduction ==
Despite the shared name of "Adoptionism" the Spanish Adoptionist Christology appears to have differed sharply from the Adoptionism of early Christianity. Spanish advocates predicated the term adoptivus of Christ only in respect to his humanity; once the divine Son of God "emptied himself" of divinity and "took the form of a servant" (Philippians 2:7), Christ's human nature was "adopted" as divine. The purpose of introducing the category of adoption was to make clear the right of Christ's humanity to the title "Son of God". The spelling "Adoptianism" (Spanish adopcianismo) is often used to distinguish the Spanish heresy from earlier Adoptionism (adopcionismo).

Historically, many scholars have followed the Adoptionists' Carolingian opponents in labeling Spanish Adoptionism as a minor revival of "Nestorian" Christology. John C. Cavadini has challenged this notion by attempting to take the Spanish Christology in its own Spanish/North African context in his important study, The Last Christology of the West: Adoptionism in Spain and Gaul, 785–820.

== Spanish disputants ==
=== Elipandus of Toledo ===
Elipandus (c. 716–805), bishop of Muslim-controlled Toledo, was the first well-known advocate of this "Adoptionist" Christology, which he articulated in response to the position of another Spanish writer, Migetius. Migetius apparently taught a form of Trinitarian theology which Elipandus found troubling; in his Letter to Migetius, Elipandus defended the single persona of Christ in the face of this issue. Contrary to what the label “Adoptionist” might suggest, Elipandus accepted the full humanity and divinity of the person of Jesus Christ; Elipandus’ use of adoptivus in reference to Christ appears in his exegesis of the "kenotic hymn" of Philippians 2:6–7. Here, Elipandus argued that Christ, after “emptying himself” of divinity and becoming a human being, was “Son of God” by virtue of adoption:

The Son of God himself, who by emptying himself, takes up adoption.

Elipandus, unlike Arius or Nestorius, held to a strict singular personhood in the incarnation: that of the eternal, divine Son. Some, like Ansprenger, have claimed that Elipandus' Christology bears similarities to that of the earlier Antiochene theologian Theodore of Mopsuestia, and may indicate a line of influence from Nestorian sources.

=== Beatus of Liebana ===
Beatus of Liebana (or Lieban), was, like Elipandus, a native of Spain, but unlike Elipandus, he lived outside of Muslim territory in the small Christian Kingdom of Asturias. A monk, Beatus appears to have been a person of influence in Asturias, possibly counselor to the Queen of León. Beatus was also a skilled exegete, best known for his Commentary on the Apocalypse of John. In Adversus Elipandum, written in response to Elipandus’ Adoptionist teachings, Beatus chastised Elipandus for what he saw as a misuse of the word servus ("slave" or "servant"), arguing that Philippians 2 referred to Christ's servanthood in relation to God. The "self-emptying" of the Son in the incarnation was not to be understood as a humiliation to the point that the human Christ would have to be adopted once more in divinity, he claimed. Additionally, Beatus criticized Elipandus for his emphasis on Christ sharing in humanity. Beatus saw this as unnecessary, and dangerously close to ignoring Jesus' distinctness from the rest of humanity; instead, he focused his attention on Christ's mediatorial position on the cross as a sufficient salvific bridge between God and humanity. In Adversus Elipandum, Beatus distinguished between the adoption of Christians as children by God, rejecting the adoption of Christ:

Now truly those who have been chosen are adopted children, not the One who chose.

=== Felix of Urgel ===
In the midst of his dialogue with Beatus on the issue of adoption, Elipandus wrote to Felix of Urgel (d. 818), Bishop of Urgell in Carolingian-occupied territory in the Pyrenees, for another opinion on the matter. It was Felix's teaching that first caught the attention of Frankish scholars and churchmen. None of Felix's works survive, and his teachings only survive as they were portrayed by the Carolingian scholars who opposed him.

Felix appears to have relied heavily on the language of adoption, tying the adoption of Christ's humanity by the divine to Christ's mediation of adoptive sonship for all believing Christians. Cavadini sees in this position a moderating stance between Elipandus and Beatus. Ultimately, Felix's Christology became the prime target for Carolingian interlocutors, and facing ecclesiastical and political pressure, he recanted before the pope. In 799, Felix composed his Confessio, in which he renounced "Nestorian" teachings and agreed to no longer use the term adoptivus.

== The Carolingian response ==
In 785, Pope Hadrian I appears to have been the first to attack Elipandus' Adoptionist Christology as a form of Nestorianism, although the pope does not seem to have been fully informed on the content of his teachings. The pope's initial negative response – describing Adoptionism as Nestorian in separating the Son of God from the human son of Mary – shaped the perception of the theology for later Carolingians. Charlemagne also grew concerned by reports of heresy in his new Pyrenean territories, and commissioned his own response to the Adoptionist teaching, spearheaded by his erudite court scholar Alcuin of York. This Carolingian response developed in three regional councils called by the king in 792 (Regensburg), 795 (Frankfurt), and 799 (Aachen).

The Council of Frankfurt in 795 was particularly significant, commissioning three documents to address the Adoptionist position: the Letter of the Bishops of Frankland to the Bishops of Spain (written by Alcuin), the Liber sacrosyllabus of Paulinus of Aquileia, and the Letter of Charlemagne to Elipandus. All three works followed Pope Hadrian I's early characterization of the Adoptionist position as Nestorian. Alcuin, in particular, developed his critique around the classical orthodox Christological dichotomy which emerged from eastern Christological controversies of the fifth and sixth centuries: Nestorianism on one extreme, and Monophysitism on the other. Alcuin refined this view in his writings against Felix of Urgel: "Letter 23 to Felix", Adversus Felicem Urgellitanum Episcopum Libri VII, and Liber Adversus Haeresin Felicis. Other Carolingian attacks on Adoptionism were composed by Benedict of Aniane, Paulinus II of Aquileia (Three Books Against Felix), and later, by Agobard. An official condemnation by Pope Leo III in 798 ended with Felix's final recantation in 799 through his Confessio. According to Pelikan, the orthodox Catholic consensus held that the key error of Spanish Adoptionism was to make Christ's sonship a predicate of his two natures rather than on his single personhood.

=== Paulinus of Aquileia ===
In his anti-Adoptionist works, Paulinus explained that Catholics proclaim and adore Jesus Christ as "true God", but also confess him to be "true man". However, calling him "true man" is not the same as calling him an ordinary man which was the implication of the idea that his humanity had been adopted to be the Son of God. He further rejected the Spanish Adoptionists' equation of adoption with assumption, since not every assumption is properly an adoption, even though every adoption is a kind of assumption. Elipandus had compared the adopted humanity of Christ with that of the other saints. Felix seemed to have taught that Christ needed to be baptized to be adopted as Son of God. Paulinus countered that if Christ had been adopted by God – as Moses had been adopted by Pharaoh's daughter, or as Christ himself had been adopted by Joseph – Christ would only be Son of God in an improper, not essential, sense. Paulinus, admitted, however, that the term "adoption" was fitting for Christians and it is Christ who confers adoption on them.

== Modern assessment ==
Modern scholars have often followed the critiques of Hadrian, Alcuin, or Agobard in constructing an interpretation of Spanish Adoptionism. Both Ansprenger and Harnack, noting similarities between Theodore of Mopsuestia's Christology and that of the Spanish Adoptionists, concluded that the Spanish must have had access to Theodore's biblical commentaries. However, John C. Cavadini has argued that the Carolingian attack on Spanish Adoptionism as "Nestorian" was based on a misunderstanding of the Spanish debate. Cavadini stresses that for all that Beatus and Elipandus might disagree, they drew inspiration from a common Christological tradition different from that of the theologians on the other side of the Pyrenees. Neither Spaniard referred to the eastern Christological debates, nor did they cite the teaching of the Council of Chalcedon (451). Rather, Cavadini claims, they drew on the unique theological heritage of Iberian Christianity, with a heavy reliance upon Augustine of Hippo, Hilary of Poitiers, and Isidore of Seville.
