= Early medieval literature =

This article presents a list of the historical events and publications of literature during the 6th through 9th centuries.

The list is chronological and does not include epigraphy or poetry. For poetry, see: 6th, 7th, 8th and 9th century in poetry. For early epigraphy, see List of languages by first written accounts.

During this period, a number of classical languages inherited from earlier epochs remain in active use (Chinese, Sanskrit, Latin, Greek, Persian, Hebrew). The same period also sees the rise of newly written vernaculars, partly replacing earlier literary languages (e.g. Old Hindi, Old French, Arabic, Germanic, Celtic, Turkic, etc.).

- Literary Chinese in Tang China
- Classical Sanskrit in the Middle kingdoms of India
- Latin in Western Europe
- Greek in the Byzantine Empire
- Middle Persian literature of the late Sassanid period
- Tiberian Hebrew as written by the Masoretes
- Classical Arabic in the Islamic Caliphate
- Classical Armenian literature of Medieval Armenia
- Old Georgian literature
- Old Turkic manuscript tradition, from the 8th century
- early Japanese literature, from the 8th century (Nara period)
- early Ge'ez literature
- early Dravidian (Tamil, and other Dravidian languages literatures) literature in South India (also Sri Lanka)
- early Celtic manuscript traditions (Old Irish, Old Welsh)
- early Germanic (Old High German, Old English, Old Saxon, Old Norse) literature, from the 8th century
- Old Church Slavonic, from the 9th century

== Undated ==
The bulk of literature in Classical Sanskrit dates to the early medieval period, but in most cases cannot be dated to a specific century.

The vocalized Masoretic Text of the Hebrew Bible developed during the 7th to 10th centuries.

The Old English Beowulf is dated to anywhere between the 8th and early 11th centuries.

Ecgbert, Archbishop of York c.732–766, establishes a notable library in the Northumbrian city of York.

== 6th century ==
- Arabic literature
  - Antarah ibn Shaddad
- Aramaic literature (Jewish Babylonian Aramaic)
  - Babylonian Talmud
- Indian Literature
  - Sanskrit literature
    - Aryabhata: Aryabhatiya
    - Yativṛṣabha: Tiloyapannatti
    - Varāhamihira: Pancha-Siddhantika, Brihat-Samhita
    - Virahanka
    - Jatasimhanandi: Varangacharita.
    - Dharmakirti: Saṃbandhaparikṣhāvrtti, Pramāṇaviniścaya, Pramāṇavārttikakārika, PramāṇavārttikasvavrttiNyāyabinduprakaraṇa, Hetubindunāmaprakaraṇa, Saṃtānāntarasiddhināmaprakaraṇa, Vādanyāyanāmaprakaraṇa
    - Bhāviveka: Madhyamakahṛdaya-karika, Prajñāpradīpa, Wisdom Lamp (Prajñāpradīpa)
    - Śīlabhadra: Buddhabhūmivyākhyāna
    - Udyotakara: Nyāyavārttika
    - Prashastapada: Padārtha-dharma-saṅgraha, Praśastapāda Bhāṣya
    - Vishakhadatta: Mudrārākṣasa, Devichandraguptam
    - Bhatta Narayana: Venisamhara
    - Sthiramati: Ratnagotravibhāga
    - Dignāga: Pramāṇa-samuccaya, Hetucakra, Alambana-parīkṣā, Abhidharmakośa-marma-pradīpa, Trikāla-parikṣa, Nyāya-mukha
    - Gaudapada: Māṇḍukya Kārikā, Durga Saptashati Tika, Uttara Gita Bhashya, Subhagodaya, Sri Vidyaratna Sutra bhasya
    - Buddhapālita: Buddhapalitavrtti
  - Tamil literature
  - Bengali literature
    - Bhusuku Pa: Charyapada (6, 21, 23, 27, 30, 41, 43 and 49 no para or verses)
- Byzantine literature
  - PG 86a: Presbyter Timothy of Constantinople, Joannes Maxentius, Theodorus Lector, Procopius Deacon of Tyre, Theodorus Bishop of Scythopolis, Presbyter Timothy of Jerusalem, Theodosius I of Alexandria, Eusebius of Alexandria, Eusebius of Emesa, Gregentius of Taphar, Patriarch Epiphanius of Constantinople, Isaac of Nineveh, Barsanuphius of Palestine, Eustathius monk, Emperor Justinian, Agapetus the Deacon, Leontius Byzantinus
  - PG 86b: Leontius Byzantinus (continuation), Patriarch Ephraim of Antioch, Paulus Silentiarius, Patriarch Eutychius of Constantinople, Evagrius Scholasticus, Eulogius of Alexandria, Simeon Stylites the Younger, Patriarch Zacharias of Jerusalem, Patriarch Modestus of Jerusalem, Anonymous on the siege of Jerusalem by the Persians, Jobius, Erechthius Bishop of Antioch in Pisidia, Peter Bishop of Laodicea.
  - Secret History by Procopius
- Chinese literature (Early Middle Chinese)
  - Emperor Jianwen of Liang
  - Thousand Character Classic
- Latin literature (see Late Latin)
  - Chronicle of Fredegar
  - Commentary on Job by Pope Gregory I
  - Etymologiae by Isidore of Seville
  - Historia Regibus Gothorum Vandalorum et Suevorum by Isidore of Seville
  - Historia Francorum by Gregory of Tours
  - The Origin and Deeds of the Goths by Jordanes
  - Patrologia Latina vols 63-80: Boetius, Ennodius Felix, Trifolius presbyter, Hormisdas I, Elpis, Fulgentius Ruspensis, Felix IV, Bonifacius II, Benedictus pater monachorum Occidentalium, Dionysius Exiguus, Viventiolus Lugdunensis, Trojanus Santonensis, Pontianus Africae, Caesarius Arelatensis, Fulgentius Ferrandus, Primasius Adrumetanus, Arator, Nicetius Trevirensis, Aurelianus Arelatensis, Cassiodorus, Gregorius Turonensis, Pelagius II, Joannes II, Benedictus I, Gregorius I, Eutropius Episcopus, Gregorius I, Paterius (Notarius Gregorii I), Alulfus Tornacensis, Maximus Caesaraugustanus Episcopus, Eutropius Episcopus, Tarra Monachus, Dinothus Abbas, Dynamus Patricius, Augustinus Apostolus Anglorum, SS Bonifacius IV, Concilium Romanum III, Bulgaranus, Paulus Emeritanus Diaconus, Tamaius De Vargas. Thomas, Gondemarus Rex Gothorum, Marcus Cassinensis, Warnaharius Lingonensis Episcopus, Columbanus Hibernus
  - Agathias
  - Evagrius Scholasticus
- Pahlavi literature
  - Borzūya

== 7th century ==
- Arabic language
  - Qur'an
- Indian Literature
  - Sanskrit literature:
    - Bhagavadajjukam (satirical play)
    - Brahmagupta: Brāhmasphuṭasiddhānta, Khandakhadyaka, Grahaṇārkajñāna
    - Kumārila Bhaṭṭa: Shlokavartika, Tantravartika, Tuptika
    - Chandragomin: Shisyalekha, Twenty Verses on the Bodhisattva Vow, Sarvatathāgataoṣṇīṣaśitātapatrā-nāmāparājitā-mahāpratyangirā-mahāvidyārājñī-nāma-dhāraṇi
    - Bhāskara I: Āryabhaṭīyabhāṣya, Mahābhāskarīya, Laghubhāskarīya
    - Bhutabali: Satkhandagama
    - Madhava-kara: Rug-vinischaya
    - Amaru: Amaru Shataka
    - Mahendravarman I: Mattavilasa Prahasana (satire), Bhagavadajjukam
    - Haribhadra: Anekāntajayapatākā, Yogadṛṣṭisamuccaya, Ashtakaprakarana, Dharmabindu, Dhūrtākhyāna, Pañcāśaka, Ṣaḍdarśanasamuccaya, Samarāiccakahā, Sāstravārtāsamuccaya, Yogabindu, Yogaśataka, Sanmatti Prakaran
    - Budhasvamin: Bṛhatkathāślokasaṃgraha
    - Bāṇabhaṭṭa: Harshacharita, Kadambari
    - Daṇḍin: Kavyadarsha, Daśakumāracarita
    - Bhamaha: Kâvyâlankâra
    - Subandhu
    - Mayurbhatta: Surya Satakam
    - Ravisena: Padma Purana
    - Manatunga: Bhaktamara Stotra
    - Haridatta: Grahacaranibandhana
  - Prakrit Literature
    - Jinabhadra: Brihatsangrahani, Briharkshetrasamasa, Visheshanavati, Visheshavashyaka Bhashya, Dhyanashataka, Jitkalpa Sutra
  - Tamil literature
- Byzantine literature
  - PG 87a-87b: Procopius of Gaza
  - PG 87c: Procopius of Gaza, Joannes Moschus, Sophronius, Alexander monk
  - PG 88: Cosmas Indicopleustes, Constantine the Deacon, Joannes Climacus, Agathias Myrinæ, Gregory Bishop of Antioch, Joannes Jejunator (Patriarch John IV of Constantinople), Dorotheus the Archimandrite
  - PG 89: Anastasius Sinaita, Anastasius of Antioch, Anastasius Abbot of Euthymius, Anastasius IV Patriarch of Antioch, Antiochus of Sabe
  - PG 90: Maximus the Abbot
  - PG 91: Maximus the Confessor, Thalassius the Abbot, Theodore of Raithu
  - PG 92: Paschal Chronicle, George Pisides
  - PG 93: Olympiodorus Deacon of Alexandria, Hesychius, Leontius Bishop of Neapolis in Cyprus, Leontius of Damascus
- Latin literature
  - Chronicon Paschale
  - Origo Gentis Langobardorum
  - Patrologia Latina vols. 80-89: Aileranus Scoto Hibernus, Ethelbertus Anglorum, SS Adeodatus I, Sisebutus Gothorum, Bertichramnus Cenomanensis, Protandius Vesuntinus Archiepiscopus, SS Bonifacius V, Sonniatus Rhemensis Archiepiscopus, Verus Ruthenensis Episcopus, Chlotarius II Francorum Rex, SS Honorius I, Dagobertus Francorum Rex, Hadoinudus Cenomanensis Episcopus, Sulpicius Bituricensis Episcopus, Autbertus Cameracensis, SS Ioannes IV, Eutrandus Ticinensis Diaconus, Victor Carthaginensis Episcopus, Braulio Caesaraugustiani, Taio Caesaraugustianus Episcopus, Isidorus Hispalensis, Liturgia Mozarabica, Venantius Fortunatus, Crisconius Africanus, Sergius I, Joannes VI, Felix Ravennatensis, Bonifacius Moguntinus
  - Hiberno-Latin
    - Hisperica Famina
- Old English literature
  - Cædmon: Cædmon's Hymn
- Middle Chinese (see Tang dynasty Chinese writers)
  - Bianji (辯機)
  - Li Dashi (李大師, 570–628)
  - Yan Shigu (顏師古, 581–645)
  - Chu Suiliang (褚遂良, 597–658)
  - Fang Xuanling (Fang Qiao, 房喬 579–648)
  - Li Qiao (李嶠, 644–713)
  - Li Jing (李靖, 571–649)
  - Li Baiyao (李百藥, 564–647)
  - Li Chunfeng (李淳風, 602–670)
  - Liu Zhiji (劉知幾, 661–721)
  - Luo Binwang (駱賓王, c. 640–684)
  - Ouyang Xun (歐陽詢, 557–641)
  - Sun Simiao (孫思邈, 581–682)
  - Yu Shinan (虞世南, 558–638)
  - Wei Zheng (魏徵, 580–643)
  - Sun Guoting (孫過庭, 646–691)
- Armenian
  - Sebeos
  - John Mamikonean
  - Anania Shirakatsi
- Ge'ez
  - Garima Gospels

== 8th century ==
- Indian Literature
  - Sanskrit literature
    - Gautama Siddha: Treatise on Astrology of the Kaiyuan Era
    - Prajñāvarman: Devātiśāyastotraṭīkā, Udānavargavivara, Viśeṣastavaṭikā
    - Shivamara II: Gajamathakalpana
    - Bhavabhuti: Mahaviracharita, Malatimadhava, Uttararamacarita
    - Vilwamangalam Swamiyar: Shree Krishna Karnamrutam, Sreechinham, Purushakaaram, Abhinava-Kausthubha-Maala, Dakshinaamoorthy-Sthavam, Kaalavadha Kaavyam, Durgaasthuthi, Baalakrishna Sthothram, Baalagopaala Sthuthy, Sreekrishna Varadaashtakam, Vrindaavana Sthothram, Bhaavanaamukuram, Raamachandraashtakam, Ganapathy Sthothram, Anubhavaashtakam, Mahaakaalaashtakam, Kaarkotakaashtakam, Krishnaleelaa-Vinodam, Sankara-Hridayamgamaa, Subanda-Saamraajyam, Thinganda-Saamraajyam, Kramadeepika
    - Akalanka: Laghiyastraya, Pramānasangraha, Nyāyaviniscaya-vivarana, Siddhiviniscaya-vivarana, Astasati, Tattvārtharājavārtika
    - Dharmottara: Nyāyabinduṭīkā
    - Lalla: Jyotiṣaratnakośa, Śiṣyadhīvṛddhidatantra
    - Acharya Vamana: Kavyalankara Sutra
    - Kamalaśīla: Bhāvanākrama, Madhyamālaṃkāra-panjika
    - Padmapadacharya: Pañcapādikā
    - Śālikanātha: Prakaraṇapañcikā, Rjuvimalāpañcikā, Dīpaśikhāpañcikā
    - Śāntarakṣita: Tattvasaṅgraha, Tattvasaṅgraha
    - Shantideva: Śikṣāsamuccaya, Bodhicaryavatara
    - Virūpa: Amṛtasiddhi
    - Adi Shankara: Commentaries on Brahmasūtra, Aitareya Upaniṣad, Bṛhadāraṇyaka Upaniṣad, Īśa Upaniṣad, Taittirīya Upaniṣad, Śvetāśvatara Upaniṣad, Kaṭha Upaniṣad, Kena Upaniṣad, Chāndogya Upaniṣad, Māṇḍūkya Upaniṣad, Muṇḍaka Upaniṣad, Praśna Upaniṣad, BhagavadgītaVishnu Sahasranama, Sānatsujātiya, Gāyatri Mantraṃ; Philosophical works: Vivekacūḍāmaṇi, Upadeśasāhasri, Pañcīkaraṇa, Ātma bodha, Aparokṣānubhūti, Nirvāṇa Ṣaṭkam, Manīśa Pañcakaṃ Vākya vṛtti
    - Vidyananda: Ashtasahasri
    - Vimalamitra: Vima Nyingthig.
    - Sridhara: Trisatika, Pāṭīgaṇita
- Byzantine literature
  - PG 94–95: John of Damascus
  - PG 96: John of Damascus, John of Nicæa, Patriarch John VI of Constantinople, Joannes of Eubœa
  - PG 97: John Malalas (6th century), Andrew of Crete, Elias of Crete and Theodore Abucara
  - PG 98: Patriarch Germanus I of Constantinople, Cosmas of Jerusalem, Gregory of Agrigento, Anonymus Becuccianus, Pantaleon Deacon of Constantinople, Adrian monk, Epiphanius Deacon of Catania, Pachomius monk, Philotheus monk, Patriarch Tarasios of Constantinople
  - PG 99: Theodore of Studion
- Latin literature
  - Bede (Patrologia Latina vols. 90–95), Historia ecclesiastica gentis Anglorum etc.
  - Anonymous, Vita Sancti Cuthberti
  - Stephen of Ripon, Vita Sancti Wilfrithi
  - Paulus Diaconus, Historia Langobardorum
  - John of Damascus
  - Patrologia Latina vols. 96-101 Hildefonsus Toletanus, Julianus Toletanus, Leo II, Carolus Magnus, Ludovicus I, Lotharius, Rudolphus I, Paulinus Aquileiensis, Theodorus Cantuariensis, Alcuinus
  - Navigatio sancti Brendani abbatis (Voyage of St Brendan the abbot)
  - 'Codex Amiatinus', earliest surviving complete manuscript of the Vulgate, produced at Monkwearmouth–Jarrow Abbey and gifted in 716 to the Pope
- Celtic literature
  - Immram Brain (maic Febail) (The Voyage of Bran [son of Febail])
  - Immram Maele Dúin (The Voyage of Máel Dúin)
- Arabic literature
  - Ibn Ishaq
  - Khalil ibn Ahmad
  - Wahb ibn Munabbih
  - Ibn al-Muqaffa'
- Middle Chinese (see Tang dynasty Chinese writers)
  - Du Huan (杜環, fl. 8th century)
  - Du You (杜佑, 735–812)
  - Li Bai (李白, 701–762)
  - Liu Zhi (劉秩, fl. 8th century)
  - Lu Yu (陸羽, 733–804), The Classic of Tea (茶經, chájīng, c. 760–62)
  - Qian Qi (錢起, 710–782)
  - Sima Zhen (司馬貞, fl. 8th century)
  - Wang Wei (王維, 699–759)
  - Yi Xing (一行, 683–727)
- Japanese literature
  - Man'yōshū (万葉集) compiled by Ōtomo no Yakamochi (大伴 家持)
- Kannada: see Rashtrakuta literature
- Old Georgian: The Life of Saint Nino, The Martyrdom of Abo Tbileli

== 9th century ==
- Byzantine literature
  - PG 100: Patriarch Nikephoros I of Constantinople, Stephen Deacon of Constantinople, Gregory of Decapolis, Patriarch Christopher I of Alexandria, Patriarch Methodios I of Constantinople
  - PG 101–103: Photius of Constantinople
  - PG 104: Photius of Constantinople, Petrus Siculus, Peter bishop of Argos (Saint Peter the Wonderworker), Bartholomew of Edessa
  - PG 105: Nicetas of Paphlagonia, Nicetas Byzantius, Theognostus monk, Anonymous, Joseph the Hymnographer
- Latin literature
  - Carolingian minuscule calligraphy begins to be developed; Martianus Hiberniensis (819–75) is among the pioneers
  - Stuttgart Psalter (c. 820), Golden Psalter of St. Gallen
  - Annales Bertiniani (830–882), Abbey of Saint Bertin, Saint-Omer, France
  - According to history-book of Tāriḵ-e Sistān (History of Sistan), the first Persian qasida is written by Moḥammad bin Wasif in praise of Ya'qub ibn al-Layth al-Saffar in c. 872.
  - De bellis Parisiacae urbis (The Wars of the City of Paris), in Latin, by Abbo Cernuus (890s)
  - Liber Pontificalis
  - Patrologia Latina vols. 102–132: Smaragdus S. Michaelis, Benedictus Anianensis, Sedulius Scotus, Agobardus Lugdunensis, Eginhardus, Claudius Taurinensis, Ludovicus Pius, Theodulfus Aurelianensis, Eigil Fuldensis, Dungalus reclusus, Ermoldus Nigellus, Symphosius Amalarius, Gregorius IV, Sergius II, Jonas Aurelianensis, Freculphus Lexoviensis, Frotharius Tullensis, Rabanus Maurus, Walafridus Strabo, the Glossa Ordinaria, Leo IV, Benedictus III, Eulogius Toletanus, Prudentius Trecensis, Angelomus Lexoviensis, Haymo Halberstatensis, Nicolaus I, Florus Lugdunensis, Lupus Ferrariensis, Paschasius Radbertus, Ratramnus Corbeiensis, Aeneas Parisiensis, Remigius Lugdunensis, Wandalbertus Prumiensis, Paulus Alvarus Cordubensis, Gotteschalcus Orbacensis, Johannes Scotus Eriugena, Ado Viennensis, Usuardus Sangermanii, Carolus II Calvus, Hincmarus Rhemensis, Anastasius bibliothecarius, Isidorus Mercator, Remigius Antissiodorensis, Notkerus Balbulus, Regino Prumiensis, Hucbaldus S. Amandi
  - Vita Brendani / Betha Brenainn / Life of St. Brendan
  - Nennius (attributed), Historia Brittonum (The History of the Britons, c. 828–29)
  - Asser, Vita Ælfredi regis Angul Saxonum (The Life of King Alfred, 893)
  - Book of Kells written and illuminated in a Columban monastery in the British Isles (c. 800)
- Old English literature (890s)
  - Alfred the Great's translations
    - Pope Gregory I's Pastoral Care, the first known book in English
    - Boethius' The Consolation of Philosophy and an alliterative verse version, the Metres of Boethius
    - Blostman ("Blooms"), an anthology partly based on the Soliloquies of Augustine
    - Portions of the Vulgate Book of Exodus and the first fifty poems of the Psalter
  - Werferth's translation of Pope Gregory I's Dialogues
  - Translation of Orosius' Histories against the Pagans incorporating the narrative of Ohthere of Hålogaland
  - Translation of Bede's Historia ecclesiastica gentis Anglorum (Ecclesiastical History of the English People)
- Arabic literature
  - Al-Kitāb al-muḫtaṣar fī ḥisāb al-ğabr wa-l-muqābala (The Compendious Book on Calculation by Completion and Balancing)
  - Persian scholar Sibawayh writes the first Arabic grammar in 840.
  - Al-Baladhuri (died 892)
  - Al-Jahiz (776–868/9)
    - Kitab al-Hayawan (Book of Animals)
    - Kitab al-Bukhala (Book of Misers)
    - Kitab al-Bayan wa al-Tabyin (Book of Eloquence and Demonstration)
    - Risalat mufakharat al-sudan 'ala al-bidan (Treatise on Blacks)
  - Ibn Sa'd (784–845) – Kitab Tabaqat Al-Kubra (Book of the Major Classes, biographical collection)
  - Abdallah ibn al-Mu'tazz (861–908)
  - Al-Waqidi (c. 748–822)
  - Ya'qubi (died 897/8)
  - The Book of One Thousand and One Nights, presumed to originate in this century (the oldest surviving text belongs to the 14th century)
- Germanic
  - Þjóðólfr of Hvinir
    - Haustlöng
    - Ynglingatal
  - Þorbjörn Hornklofi
    - Glymdrápa
    - Hrafnsmál (Haraldskvæði)
- Sanskrit literature
  - Gunavarma I
  - Amoghavarsha I
  - 868: May 11 – The Diamond Sutra, the oldest known surviving dated book, is printed in China.
- Middle Chinese (see Tang dynasty Chinese writers)
  - Duan Chengshi (段成式, died863)
  - Han Yu (韓愈, 768–824)
  - Mo Xuanqing (莫宣卿, died 834)
  - Li Ao (李翱, 772–841)
  - Liu Yuxi (劉禹錫, 772–842)
  - Liu Zongyuan (柳宗元, 773–819)
  - Yuan Zhen (元稹, 779–831)
  - Zhang Yanyuan (張彥遠)
- Tamil: see Chola literature
- Kannada: see Rashtrakuta literature
  - Kavirajamarga, Royal path to poets in Kannada
  - Vaddaradhane
  - Govindsvamin
  - Shivakotiacharya
- Telugu
  - Addanki Poetic Inscription (848 AD)
- Armenian
  - Tovma Artsruni
- Old Church Slavonic
- Turkic
  - Book of Dede Korkut

== See also ==
- Ancient literature
- List of years in literature
- 10th century in literature
- Byzantine literature
- Kannada literature
- Medieval Bulgarian literature
- Puranas
