= Murti =

Religious image in Hinduism

Murti in Hinduism
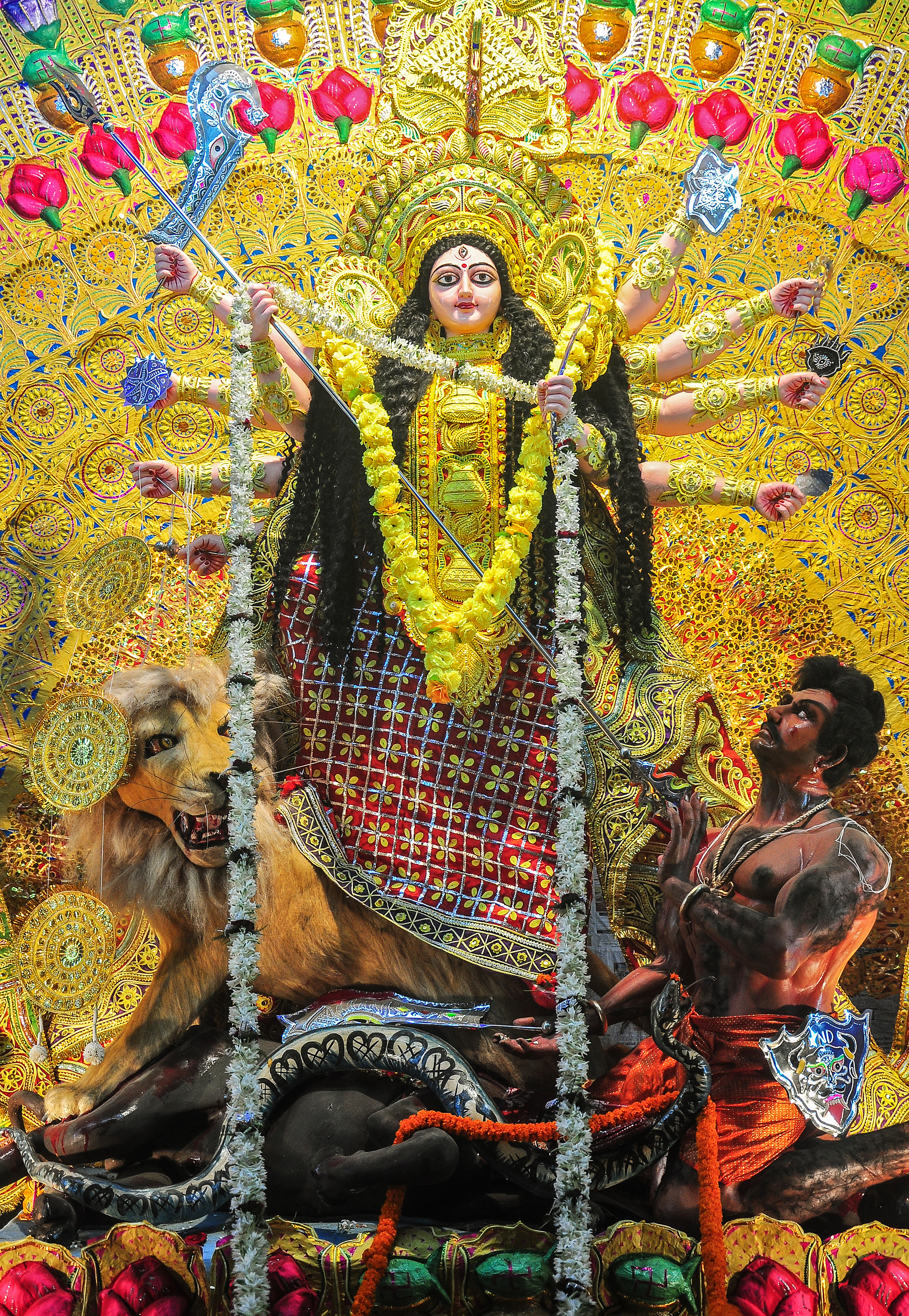
Durga

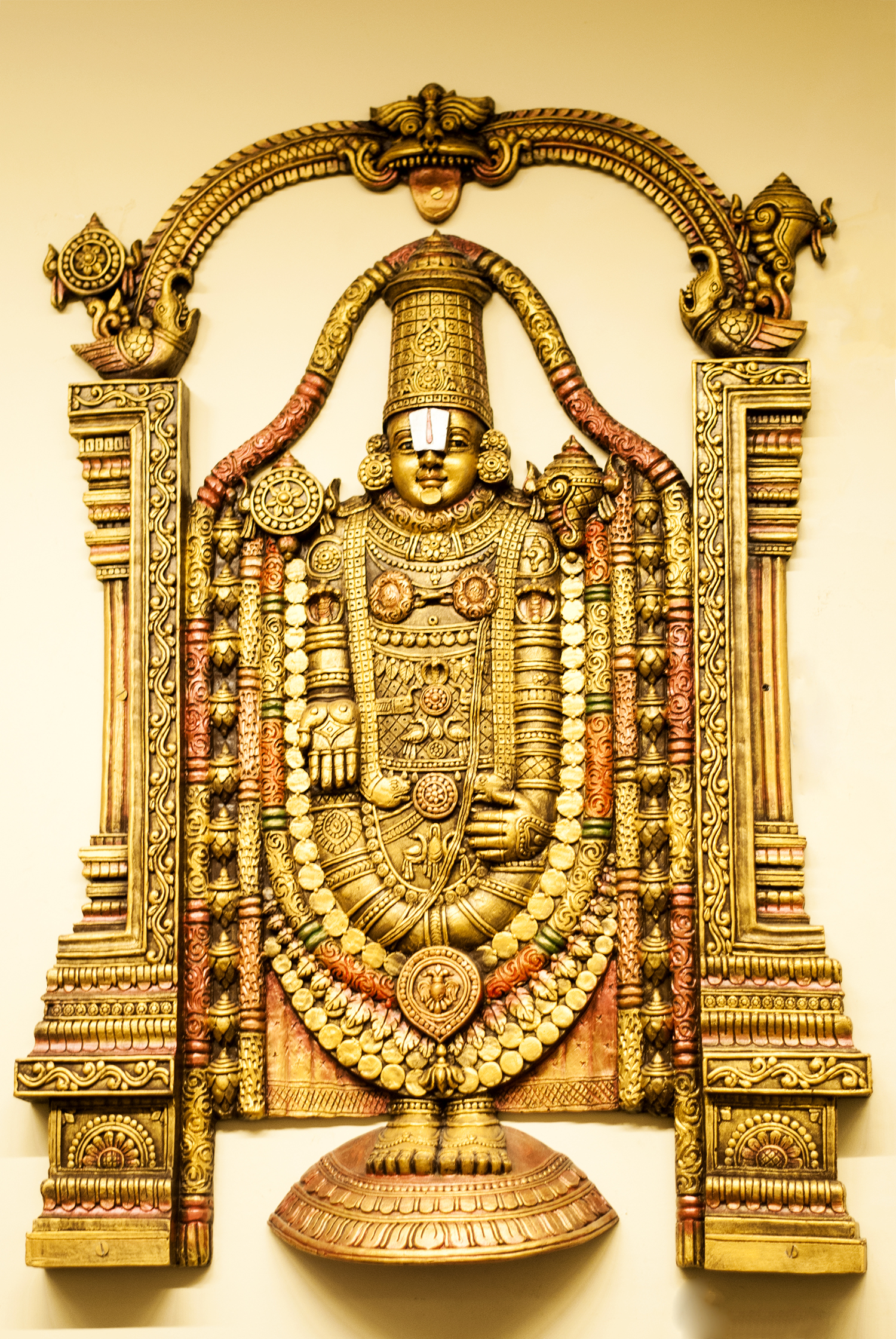
Venkateshvara

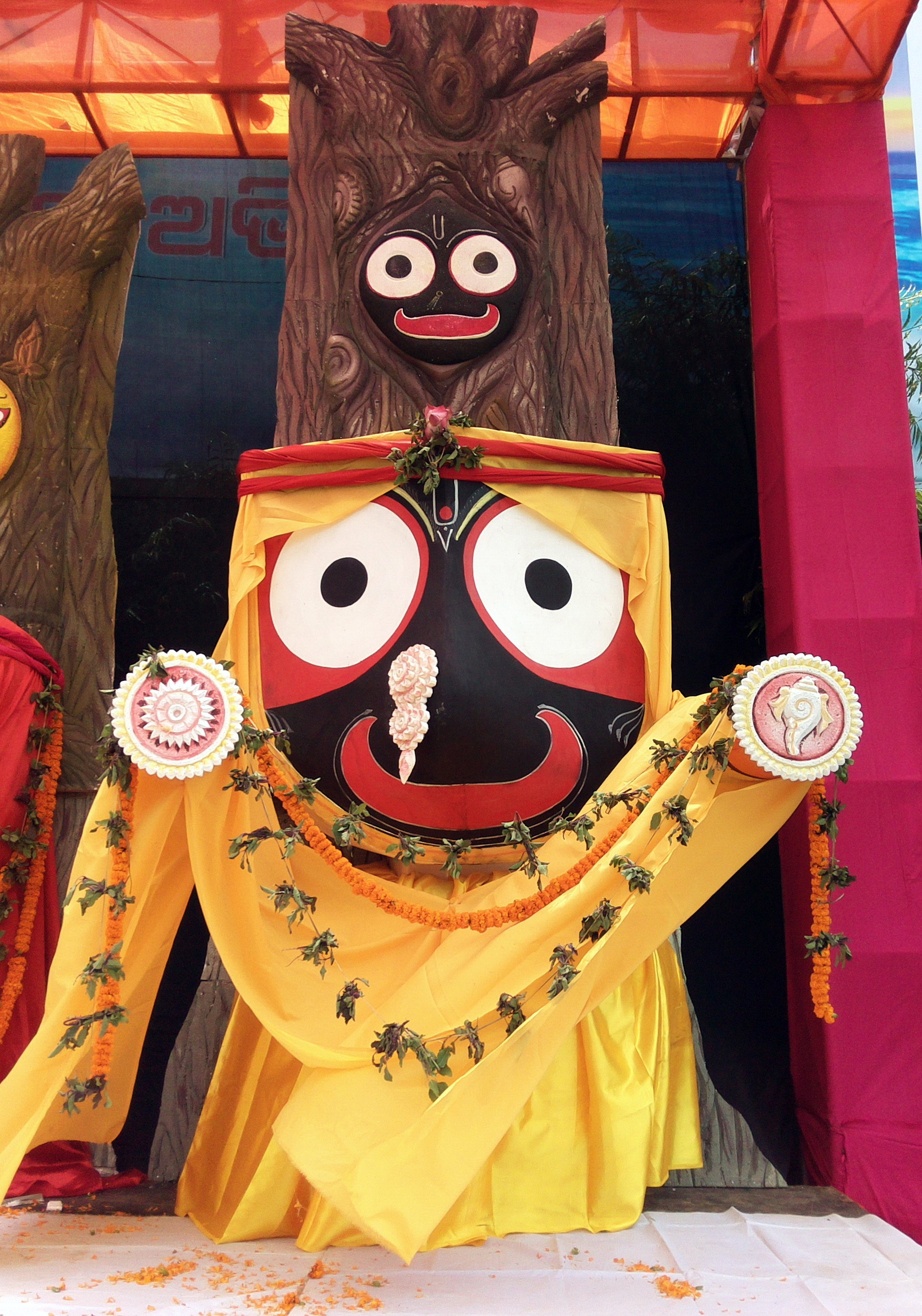
Jagannath

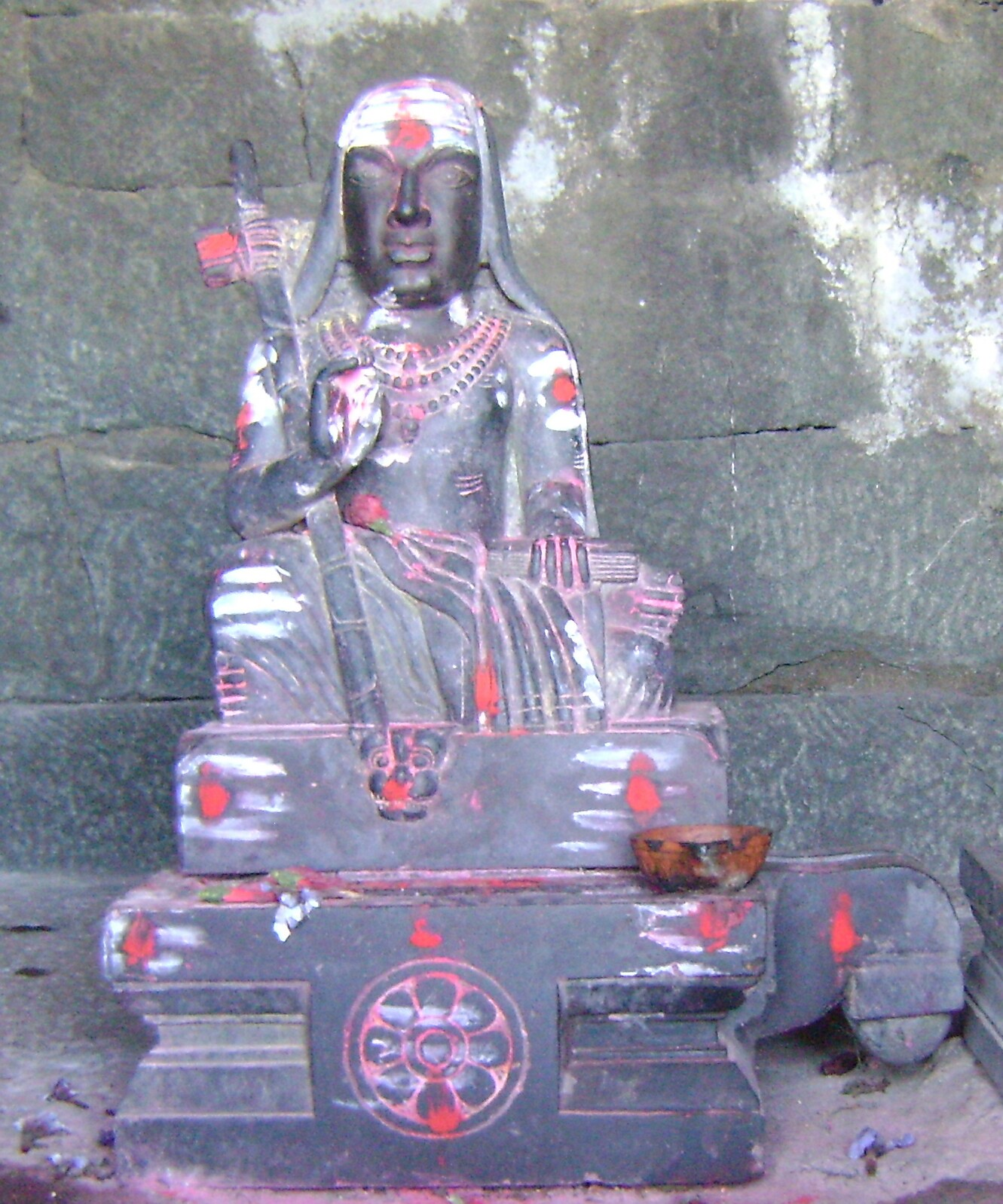
Adi Shankara

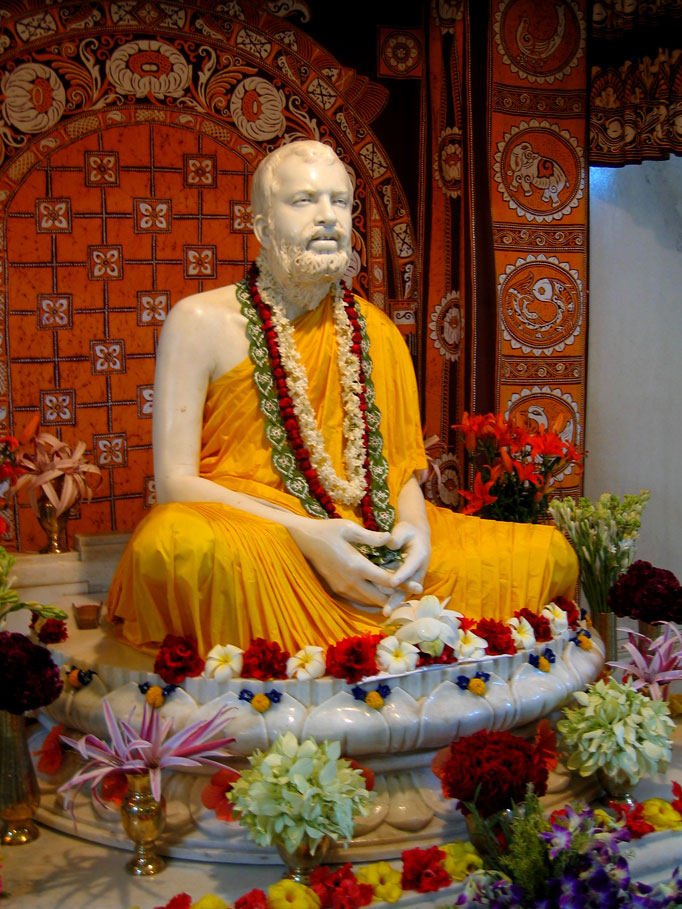
Ramakrishna

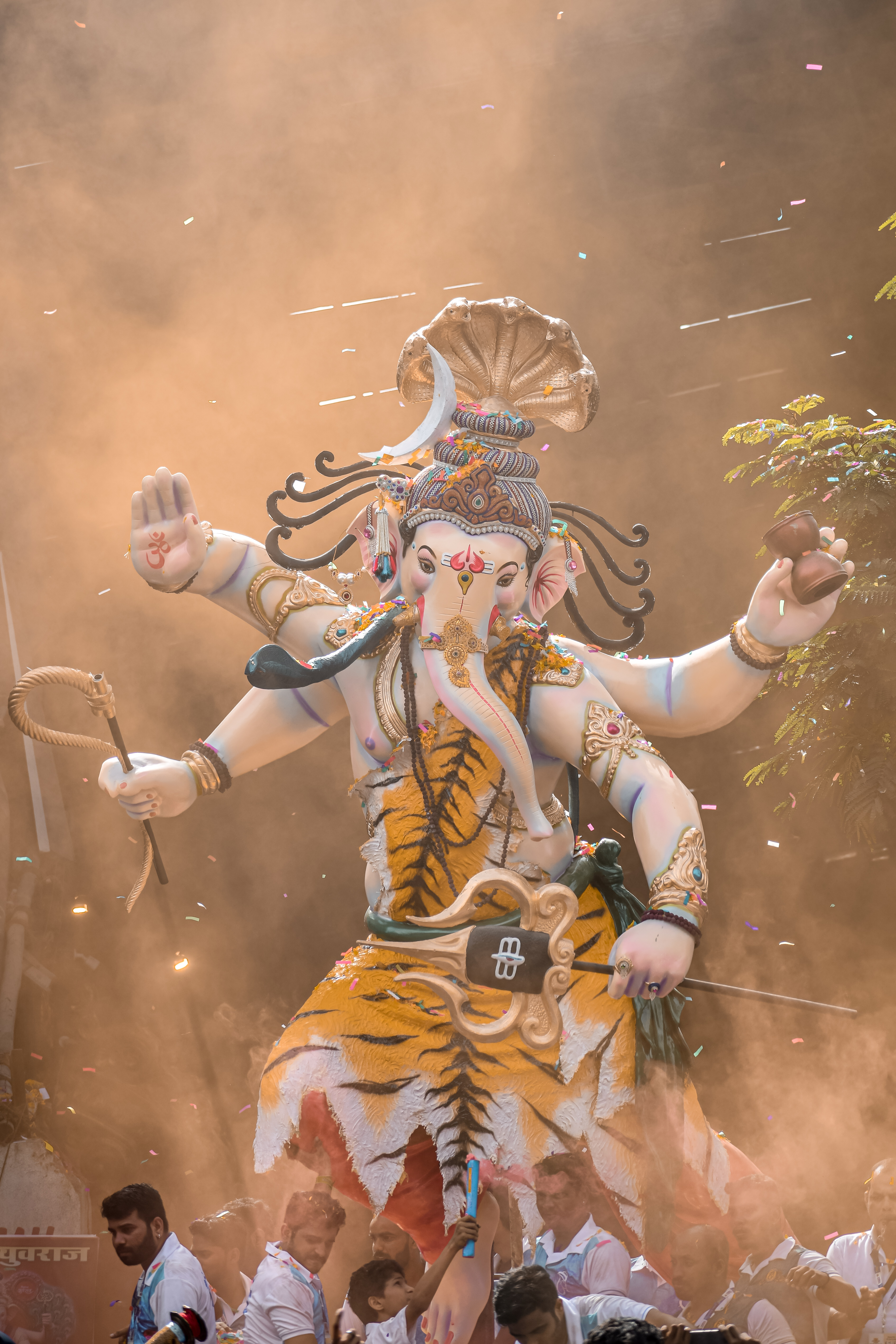
Ganesha
Murti (idols, images) of different deities and saints

In the Hindu tradition, a murti (Sanskrit: मूर्ति, romanized: mūrti, lit. 'statue, sculpture, form, embodiment, or solid object') is a devotional image, such as a statue or icon, of a deity or saint used during puja and/or in other customary forms of actively expressing bhakti or reverence – whether at Hindu temples or shrines. A mūrti is a sacred image or embodiment of a deity and is worshipped for devotional activities. Thus, not all icons of gods and saints are mūrti; for example, purely decorative depictions of divine figures often adorn Hindu temple architecture in intricately carved doorframes, on colourfully painted walls, and ornately sculpted rooftop domes. Different Hindu traditions understand the nature of the murti differently. Some regard it as a symbolic representation or embodiment of the divine, while others hold that, following consecration (prāṇa pratiṣṭhā), god is truly present in the murti and receives worship directly through it.

Murti are also found in some nontheistic Jain traditions, where they serve as symbols of revered mortals inside Jain temples, and are worshiped in murtipujaka rituals.

A murti is typically made by carving stone, wood working, metal casting or through pottery. Ancient era texts describing their proper proportions, positions and gestures include the Puranas, Agamas, and Samhitas. The expressions in a murti vary in diverse Hindu traditions, ranging from ugra (transl. angry) symbolism to express destruction, fear, and violence (Durga, Kali and Chandi/Chamunda) to saumya (transl. calm) symbolism to express joy, knowledge, and harmony (Saraswati, Lakshmi, Parvati and Ganesha). Saumya images are most common in Hindu temples. Other murti forms found in Hinduism include the lingam and shaligram.

A murti is an embodiment of the divine, the ultimate reality or Brahman, to some Hindus. In a religious context, they are found in Hindu temples or homes, where they may be treated as a beloved guest and serve as a participant of puja. On other occasions, they serve as the centre of attention in annual festive processions; these are called utsava murti. The earliest murti are mentioned by Pāṇini in the 4th century BCE. Prior to that, the agnicayana ritual ground seemed to serve as a template for the temple.

A murti may also be referred to as a vigraha, pratima or simply deity.

Hindu devotees go to the mandirs to take darshan, bringing prepared offerings of naivedya to be blessed at the altar before the deity, and to perform puja and aarti.

== Etymology and nomenclature ==
=== Meaning of murti ===
Murti is a Sanskrit term for an image or representation of a deity in Hinduism. It can refer to anything with a distinct shape or form, but in a religious context it usually means a sacred image or embodiment of a deity. Religious studies scholar Rita D. Sherma describes a murti as "visual theology" that presents scriptural narratives in a visible form that can be. Anthropologist Gilles Tarabout states that physical images can support mental imagery, prayer and ritual practice.

Murti literally means any solid body or form with a definite shape or limits produced from material elements. It contrasts with the mind, thought, and immaterial in ancient Indian literature. The term also refers to any embodiment, manifestation, incarnation, personification, appearance, image, idol, or statue of a deity.

=== Early uses of the word ===
The earliest mention of the term murti occurs in primary Upanishads composed in the 1st millennium BCE, particularly in verse 3.2 of Aitareya Upanishad, verse 1.13 of Shvetashvatara Upanishad, verse 6.14 of Maitrayaniya Upanishad and verse 1.5 of Prashna Upanishad. For example, the Maitrayaniya Upanishad uses the term to mean a "form, manifestation of time". The section sets out to prove Time exists, acknowledges the difficulty in proving Time exists by Pramana (epistemology in Indian philosophy), then inserts a theory of inductive inference for epistemological proof as follows,

On account of the subtleness of Time, this is the proof of its reality;
On account of this, the Time is demonstrated.
Because without proof, the assumption which is to be proved is not permissible;
But, when one comprehends it in its parts, that which is itself to be proved or demonstrated becomes the ground of proof, through which it brings itself into consciousness (in an inductive way).

— Maitri Upanishad 6.14

The section includes the concept of Time and non-Time, stating that non-Time existed before the creation of the universe, and time came into existence with the creation of the universe. Non-time is indivisible, time is divisible, and the Maitri Upanishad then asserts that the "year is the mūrti of time". Robert Hume translates the discussion of "mūrti of time", in verse 6.14 of the Maitri Upanishad, as "form".

=== Murti in the Vedic period ===
Western scholarship on Hinduism emphasizes that there was neither murti nor temples nor idol-facilitated worship in the Vedic era. The Vedic Hinduism rituals were directed at nature and abstract deities called during yajna with hymns. However, there isn't a universal consensus, with scholars such as AC Das, pointing to the word Mūradeva in Rig Veda verses 7.104.24, 10.87.2 and 10.87.14. This word may refer to "Deva who is fixed" or "Deva who is foolish".

The former interpretation, if accurate, may imply that there were communities in the Vedic era who had Deva in the form of murti, and the context of these hymns suggests that the term could be referring to practices of the tribal communities outside of the Vedic fold.

=== Early evidence for murtis ===
One of the earliest firm textual evidence of Deva images, in the sense of murti, is found in Jivikarthe Capanye by the Sanskrit grammarian Pāṇini who lived about 4th-century BCE. He mentions Acala and Cala, with former referring to images in a shrine, and the latter meaning images that were carried from place to place. Panini also mentions Devalaka, meaning custodians of images of worship who show the images but do not sell them, as well as Jivika as people whose source of livelihood was the gifts they received from devotees. In ancient Sanskrit texts that follow Panini's work, numerous references are found to divine images with terms such as Devagrha, Devagara, Devakula, Devayatana and others. These texts, states Noel Salmond, strongly suggest that temples and murti were in existence in ancient India by about 4th century BCE.

Recent archaeological evidence confirms that the knowledge and art of sculpture was established in India by the Maurya Empire period (~3rd century BCE).

=== Other terms for murtis ===
By the early 1st millennium BCE, the term murti meant cult image, both painted images or statues, in various Indian texts such as Bhavishya Purana verse 132.5.7, Brihat Samhita 1.8.29, and inscriptions in different parts of India. The term murti has been a more generic term referring to an image or statue of anyone, either a deity, of any human being, animal or any art. Pratima includes murti as well as painting of any non-anthropomorphic object. In contrast, Bera or Bimba meant only "image of god", and Vigraha was synonymous with Bimba.

=== Forms and meanings of murtis ===
Some scholarly and religious texts distinguish murti from related Sanskrit terms like pratima, which may refer to an image or sculpted likeness used as an aid to worship. Some philosophical traditions view physical images as symbols or teaching aids that help worshippers focus on a formless divine reality beyond the image itself. In some philosophical interpretations, a murti is a symbolic or educational tool that help worshipers focus on a formless divine reality beyond the image itself. In active temple rituals, however, a murti serves as a direct support for inviting and interacting with the divine presence, a practice specifically known as murti-puja.

Some interpretations of Hindu scriptures like the Bhagavad Gita, distinguish between avyakta-murti, the unmanifest divine presence, and vyakta-murti, the visible form of the divine. In addition to this, in some Hindu philosophical traditions, divine reality is understood as nirguna, without form or attributes, or saguna, with form and qualities. In some traditions, murtis are understood as physical representations of ultimate reality that support worshippers in their spiritual practice.

Although murti is often associated with human-shaped statues, Hindu worship includes both human-shaped figures,which are known as iconic forms as well as objects without human or animal form, which are known as aniconic forms. In some shrines and temples, objects without human or animal form serve as the main physical focus (ālambana) for the divine presence. These include sacred salagrama stones, swords, tridents, trees, metal mirrors and earthen mounds.

== Types ==
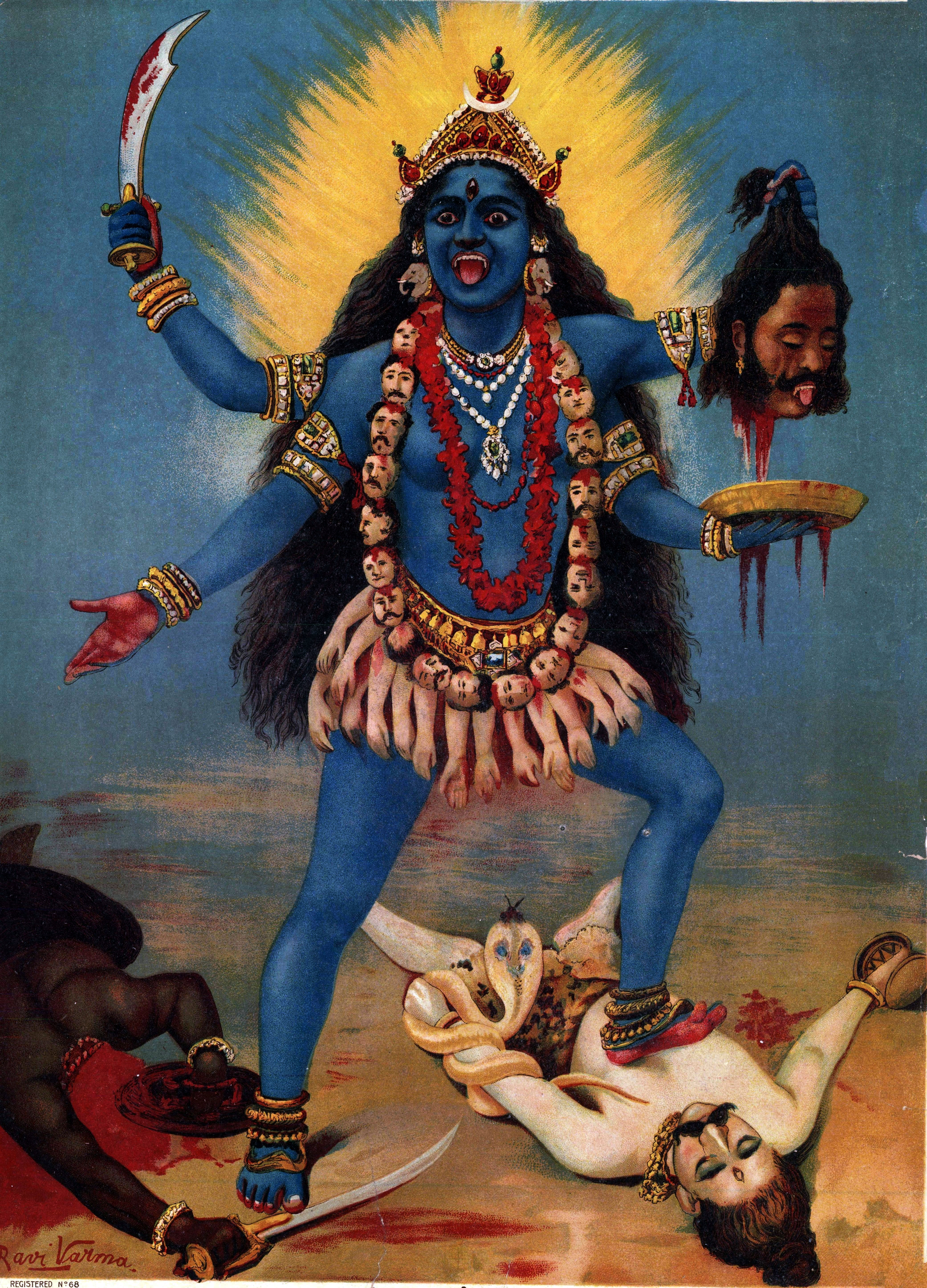
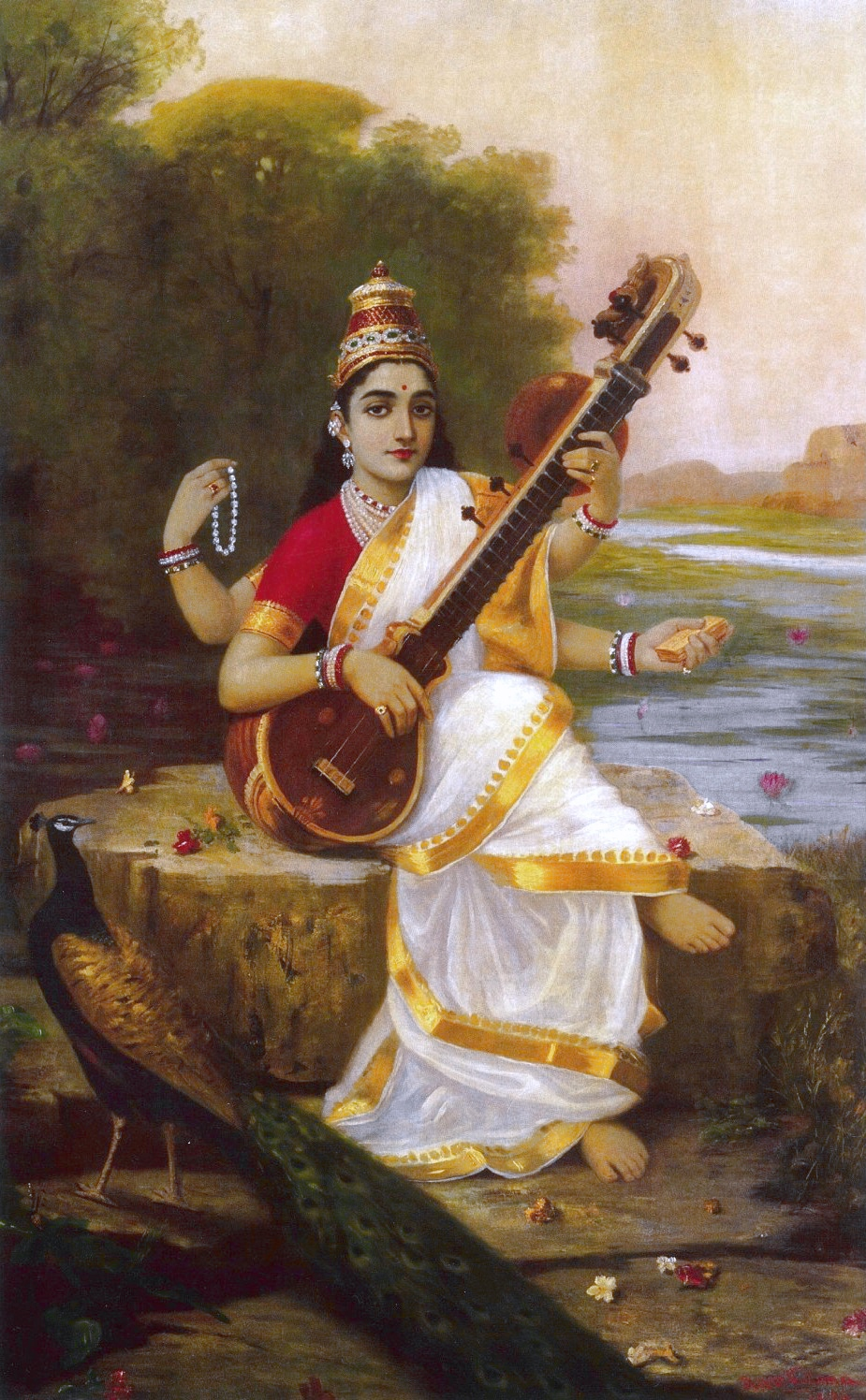
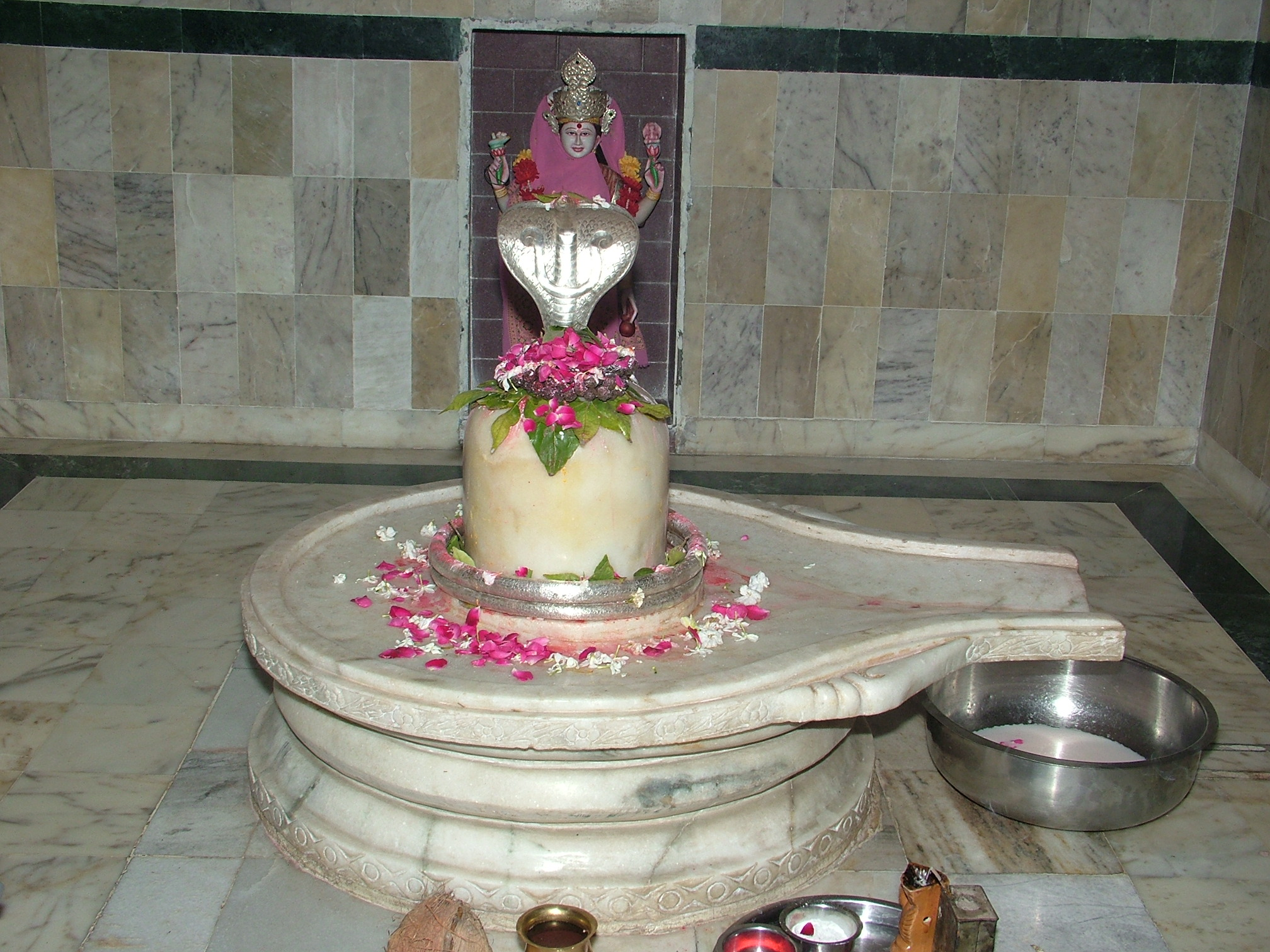
Murti in diverse Hindu traditions vary widely in their expression. Raudra or ugra images express destruction, fear and violence, such as Kali image on left. Shanta or saumya images express joy, knowledge and harmony, such as Saraswati (centre). Saumya images are most common in Hindu temples. Linga murti (right) are an alternate form.

A murti in contemporary usage is any image or statue. It may be found inside or outside a temple or home, installed to be moved with a festive procession (utsava murti), or just be a landmark. It is a significant part of Hindu iconography, and is implemented in many ways. Two major categories include:

1. Ferocious forms: Raudra or ugra are images that were meant to terrify, induce fear. These typically have wide, circular eyes, carry weapons, have skulls and bones as adornment. These idols were worshipped by soldiers before going to war, or by people in times of distress or errors. Raudra deity temples were not set up inside villages or towns, but invariably outside and in remote areas of a kingdom. Some murtis portray the divine in fierce forms described as ghora or ugra. These include Krishna’s all-devouring cosmic form in the Bhagavad Gita and fierce forms of goddesses. Murtis like these have been interpreted as representing divine power overcoming evil, protecting devotees, and restoring order (dharma).
2. Peaceful forms: Other murtis represent benign, gentle, and peaceful divine aspects. These forms are associated with compassion, grace and love and may provide a focus for prayer, devotional worship and contemplation. Shanta and saumya are images that were pacific, peaceful and expressive of love, compassion, kindness and other virtues in Hindu pantheon. These images would carry symbolic icons of peace, knowledge, music, wealth, flowers, sensuality among other things. In ancient India, these temples were predominant inside villages and towns.

Beyond anthropomorphic forms of religious murti, some traditions of Hinduism cherish aniconism, where alternate symbols are shaped into a murti, such as the linga for Shiva, yoni for Devi, and the saligrama for Vishnu.

=== Humanlike murtis and sacred objects ===
In addition to human-shaped (iconic) murtis, Hindu traditions also use non-human (aniconic) physical objects as sacred supports for the divine presence:

- Linga: A sacred stone emblem which serves as the main physical support for Shiva.
- Salagrama: A sacred ammonite fossil worshipped in some Hindu traditions as a representation of Vishnu.
- Other sacred objects: Some shrines use consecrated swords, tridents, metal mirrors, sacred trees and earthen mounds to represent the divine presence. These objects are in particular associated with the worship of goddesses and local deities.

== Methods and manuals ==
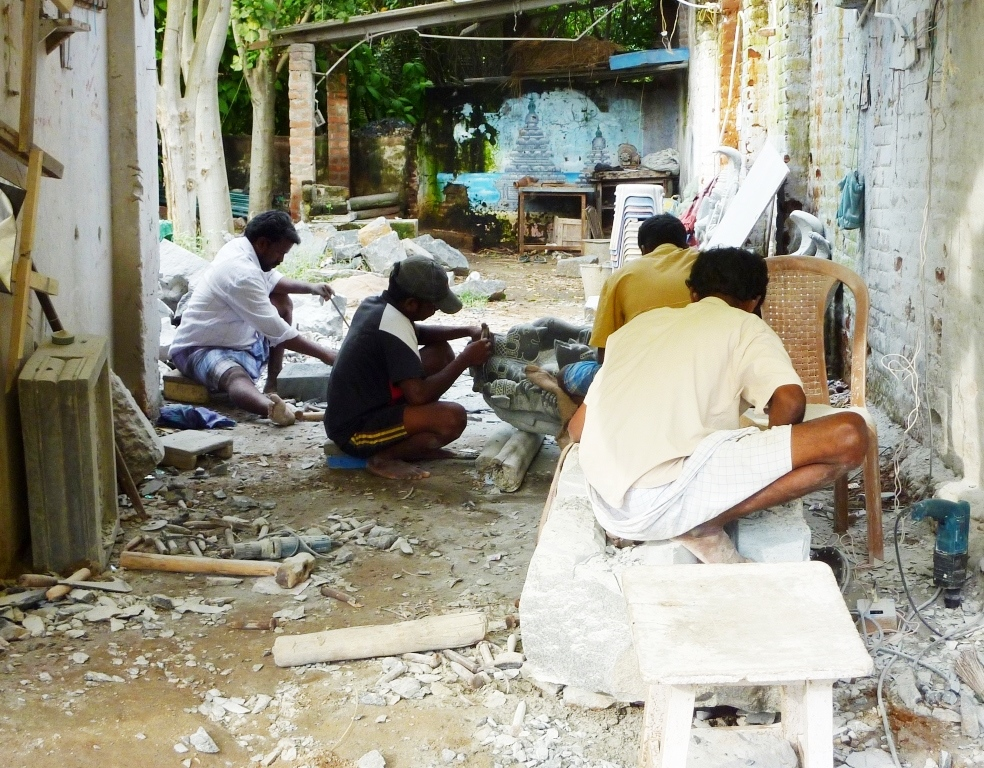
Men carving stone murti at Mahabalipuram. 2010

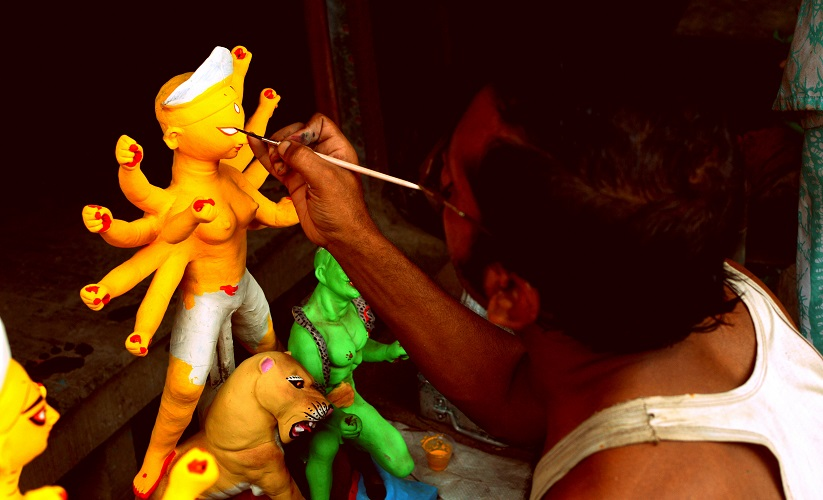
Creation of Durga murti at Kolkata.

=== Design rules and consecration ===
Murti, when produced properly, are made according to the design rules of the Shilpa Shastras. They recommend materials, measurements, proportions, decoration, and symbolism of the murti. Explanation of the metaphysical significance of each stage of manufacture and the prescription of specific mantras to sanctify the process and evoke and invoke the power of the deity in the image are found in the liturgical handbooks the Agamas and Tantras. Religious scholar Rita D. Sherma uses the term "visual theology" to describe how these traditional designs represent sacred stories in physical form and help worshippers focus their mind during meditation.

In Tantric traditions, a murti is installed by priests through the Prana pratishta ceremony, where mantras are recited sometimes with yantras (mystic diagrams), whereby state Harold Coward and David Goa, the "divine vital energy of the cosmos is infused into the sculpture" and then the divine is welcomed as one would welcome a friend. The esoteric Hindu tantric traditions through texts such as Tantra-tattva follow elaborate rituals to infuse life into a murti. Ritual manuals like the Tantrasamuccaya require the tantri (priest) to first meditate on the absolute (brahman). The tantri then use mantras (sacred chants), dress, and makeup to invite specific divine qualities into the murti. After consecration, worshippers treat the murti as a physical focus (ālambana) for worship. Ritual practices may include bathing and dressing the image, offering food and participating in darsan which is the viewing of and being seen by the deity.

Some tantra texts such as the Pancaratraraksa state that anyone who considers an icon of Vishnu as nothing but "an ordinary object" made of iron "goes to hell". In Sri Vaiṣṇavism, such a murti is worshipped as an arcavatara which is a direct worshipful manifestation of Vishnu.

The use of murti and particularly the prana protist consecration ceremony, states Buhnemann, has been criticized by Hindu groups. These groups state that this practice came from more recent "false tantra books", and there is not a single word in the Vedas about such a ceremony.

A Hindu prayer before cutting a tree for a murti

Oh, Tree! you have been selected for the worship of a deity,
Salutations to you!
I worship you per rules, kindly accept it.
May all who live in this tree, find residence elsewhere,
May they forgive us now, we bow to them.

— Brihat Samhita 59.10 - 59.11

=== Artisans, materials and preparation rituals ===
The artists who make any art or craft, including murti, were known as shilpins. The formally trained Shilpins shape the murti not following fancy but following canonical manuals such as the Agamas and the Shilpa Shastras texts such as Vishvakarma. The material of construction range from clay to wood to marble to metal alloys such as panchaloha. Chapter 60 of the Bṛhat Samhitā links different murti materials with specific outcomes. For example, it associates wood and clay with longevity, strength and victory; gold with health; silver with fame; copper with children; and a stone emblem of Siva with an increase in landed property. At the same time, it also associates cracked or damaged murtis with destruction.

The sixth century Brihat Samhita and eighth-century text Manasara-Silpasastra (literally: "treatise on art using the method of measurement"), identify nine materials for murti construction – gold, silver, copper, stone, wood, Sudha (a type of stucco, mortar plaster), sarkara (gravel, grit), Bahasa (marble types), and earth (clay, terracotta). For Bahasa, the texts describe working methods for various types of marble, specialized stones, colors, and a range of opacity (transparent, translucent and crystal).

=== Proportions and design rules ===
Brihat Samhita, a 6th-century encyclopedia of a range of topics from horticulture to astrology to gemology to murti and temple design, specifies in Chapter 56 that the pratima (murti) height should be $\tfrac{7}{8}$ of the sanctum sanctorum's door height, the Pratima height and the sanctum sanctorum room's width be in the ratio of 0.292, it stands on a pedestal that is 0.146 of sanctum room width, thereafter the text describes 20 types of temples with their dimensions. Chapter 58 of the text describes the ratios of various anatomical parts of a murti, from head to toe, along with the recommendation in verse 59.29 that generally accepted variations in dress, decoration, and dimensions of local regional traditions for the murti are the artistic tradition.

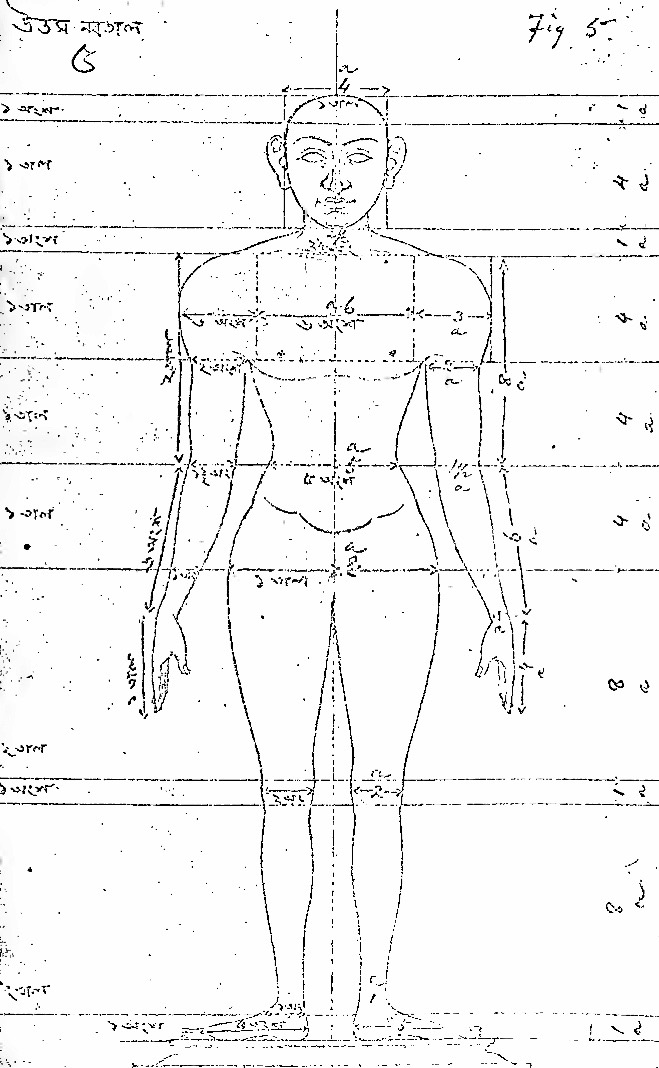
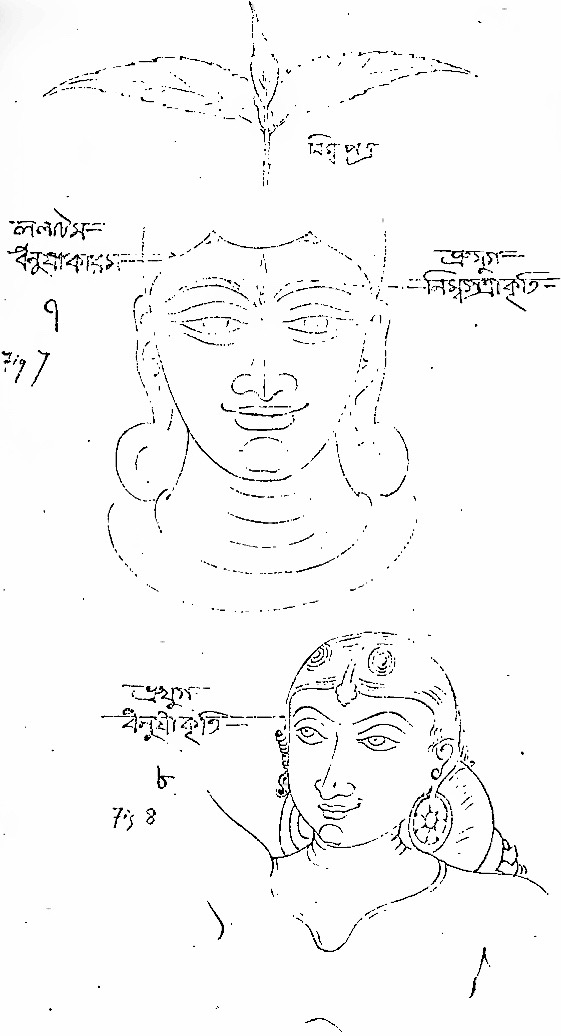
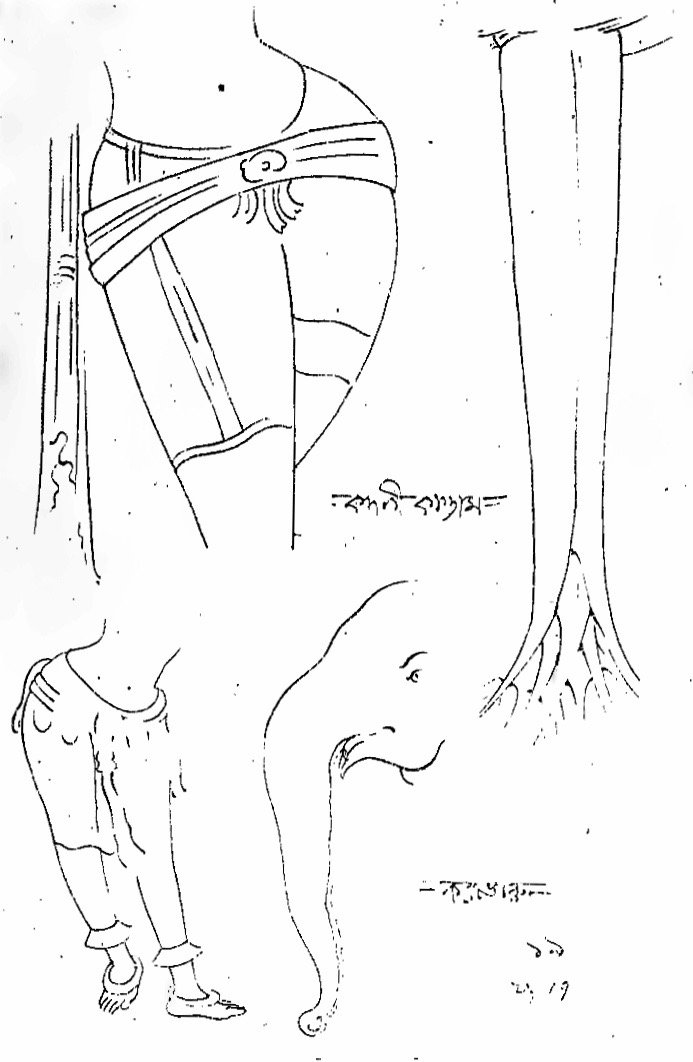
Proper murti design is described in ancient and medieval Indian texts. They describe proportions, posture, and expressions among other details, often referencing nature.

The texts recommend materials of construction, proportions, postures, and mudra, symbolic items the murti holds in its hands, colors, garments, and ornaments to go with the murti of each god or goddess, vehicles of deities such as Garuda, bull and lion, and other details. The texts also include chapters on the design of Jaina and Buddhist murti, as well as reliefs of sages, apsaras, different types of devotees (based on bhakti yoga, jnana yoga, karma yoga, ascetics) to decorate the area near the murti.

The texts recommend that the material of construction and relative scale of murti be correlated to the scale of the temple dimensions, using twelve types of comparative measurements. Neither the Hybrid Sanskrit of Mahayana Buddhism, nor the Pali of Theravada Buddhism has the word murti. PK Acharya imputed the Hinduïstic word murti on Buddhist iconography, in which he erred.

In addition to physical dimensions, some traditional Hindu manuals associate the materials used to make murtis with specific outcomes. Chapter 60 of the sixth-century Bṛhat Samhita for example links wood and clay with longevity, prosperity, strength and victory; gold with health and growth; silver with fame; copper with children; and a stone linga of Siva with increased land ownership. Some Tantric and Agamic ritual guides for example describe how a single physical object (alambana) may represent different divine forms through changes to its clothing, decorations, ritual objects and accompanying mantras.

In some traditions, these designs are understood as giving physical form (as murtis) to scriptural ideas and providing a focus to worshippers for meditation (dhyana) and rituals performed for specific aims (kamya).

=== Regional variations and philosophical perspectives ===
In Southern India, the material used predominantly for murti is black granite, while the material in North India is white marble. However, for some Hindus, it is not the materials used that matter, but the faith and meditation on the universal Absolute Brahman. More particularly, devotees meditate or worship on the formless God (nirguna Brahman) through murti symbolism of God (saguna Brahman) during a puja before a murti, or the meditation on a Tirthankara in the case of Jainism, thus making the material of construction or the specific shape of the murti not spiritually important.

=== Philosophical perspectives ===
Different Hindu philosophical traditions understand the murti in different ways:

- Advaita Vedanta: According to some interpretations of Advaita Vedanta, worship of a personal deity (saguṇa brahman) through a murti can help prepare the mind for self-knowledge (jnana). This is said to lead one towards the realisation of non-duality (advaita), in which the individual self (atman) and ultimate reality (brahman) are understood as one.
- Sri Vaiṣṇavism (Visiṣṭadvaita):In Sri Vaiṣṇava interpretations of Visiṣṭadvaita, the physical universe and individual souls are understood as the body (sarira) of Vishnu. The consecrated temple murti is regarded as an arcavatara, in which God is believed to be directly present and accessible to worshippers.
- Dvaita and Gauḍiya Vaiṣṇavism: In Madhva’s Dvaita, God and individual souls are understood as separate. Caitanya’s Gauḍiya Vaiṣṇavism describes the relationship between God and souls in terms of both difference and unity (bhedabheda). Both traditions emphasise devotion (bhakti) to Vishnu or Krishna. Gauḍiya Vaiṣṇava texts identify 5 main forms of devotional relationship (bhakti-rasa) which are peaceful devotion (santa), service (dasya), friendship (sakhya), parental affection (vatsalya) and romantic love (madhurya).
- Saiva Siddhanta: According to Saiva Siddhanta, reality comprises three distinct and eternal categories which are God (pati), individual souls (pasu), and worldly bonds (pasa). Souls are understood to be affected by worldly bondage and spiritual impurities (mala). Agamic rituals, temple initiation (dikṣa), and consecrated images (murtis) are regarded as means through which Shiva’s grace supports ones purification and progress towards liberation.

=== Regional traditions ===
Sanskrit texts like the Silpa Sastras and Agamas provide guidelines for creating murtis and performing temple rituals.Regional devotional movements helped make these traditions more accessible within local communities. In various regions of India, saint-poets described the divine as a loving, personal deity associated with a local temple and represented by a murti with a familiar regional name and appearance. These regional movements may have made religious practices more accessible to a wider range of social groups. Forms of worship included carved stone temple images, festival (utsava) murtis carried through village streets, and natural or uncarved sacred objects such as trees, stones, metal mirrors and consecrated weapons.

Across India, regional devotional traditions incorporated the worship of murtis into community life through poetry, music, and local languages.

- Tamil Nadu: From around the 6th century, poets known as the 12 Vaisnava Alvars and 63 Saiva Nayanars composed Tamil hymns associated with particular temples and their murtis. The 4,000 hymns attributed to the Alvars were compiled in the Nalayira Divya Prabandham. Within the Sri Vaisnava tradition of ubhaya Vedanta ("dual Vedanta"), these hymns had scriptural authority alongside Sanskrit texts and were incorporated into daily temple rituals and festival processions. Sri Vaiṣṇava theology sees the consecrated temple murti as an arcavatara, an accessible form of God.
- Karnataka: During the 12th century, the Virasaiva, or Lingayat, movement became influential in Karnataka with it being associated with figures like Basava. Its poet-saints composed Kannada poems known as vacanas, which showed devotion to Siva and criticised aspects of caste and social hierarchy. Worship focused on the istalinga, which is a small emblem of Siva worn on the body which allowed followers to worship outside temple settings and reduced their reliance on murtis.
- Maharashtra: From the 13th century, the Varkari tradition developed around devotion to Viṭhoba, a form of Vishnu whose murti is in the Pandharpur temple. The tradition includes works by Marathi poet-saints like Jnanesvara, Namdev, Cokhameḷa, Eknath and Tukaram. Their devotional compositions include abhaagas performed as part of kirtan. During annual pilgrimages, devotees travel on foot with palanquins (palkhis) to Pandharpur for darsan of the Viṭhoba murti.
- Bengal and Assam: Some devotional traditions in Bengal and Assam placed less emphasis on temple-based murti worship (murti-puja) and focused instead on personal devotion, sacred sound and group singing. Some Baul traditions in Bengal criticised temple murtis, priest-led rituals and social hierarchies, locating the divine within the human person. In Assam, traditions associated with the Vaiṣṇava reformers Sankaradeva and Madhavadeva centred communal worship on chanting (nam-kirtan) and devotional literature, including the Nam-ghoaa.

=== History and origin debates ===
According to John Keay, "Only after achieving remarkable expertise in the portrayal of the Buddha figure and of animal and human, did Indian stonemasons turn to produce images of the orthodox 'Hindu' deities". This view, however, is not shared by other scholars. Trudy King et al. state that stone images of reverential figures and guardian spirits (yaksha) were first produced in Jainism and Hinduism, by about 2 century BCE, as suggested by Mathura region excavations, and this knowledge grew into iconographic traditions and stone monuments in India including those for Buddhism. Neither the Hybrid Sanskrit of Mahayana Buddhism, nor the Pali of Theravada Buddhism has the word 'murti'.

Academics have put forward different explanations for the social origins of image worship (murti-puja). For example, some 19th and 20th century theories have described murti-puja as a popular practice that was accepted by priests. More recent historical evidence and research from inscriptions suggests that early murti-puja was also developed and promoted within learned monks, nuns and priests. Archaeological and ethnographic evidence suggests that objects without human or animal form like natural stones, sacred trees, earthen mounds and ritual objects, were used before human shaped stone murtis became common in temples. An early textual reference to divine images (pratima) has been found in the work of Panini a Sanskrit scholar, which has been dated to around the 4th century BC.

== Role in worship ==
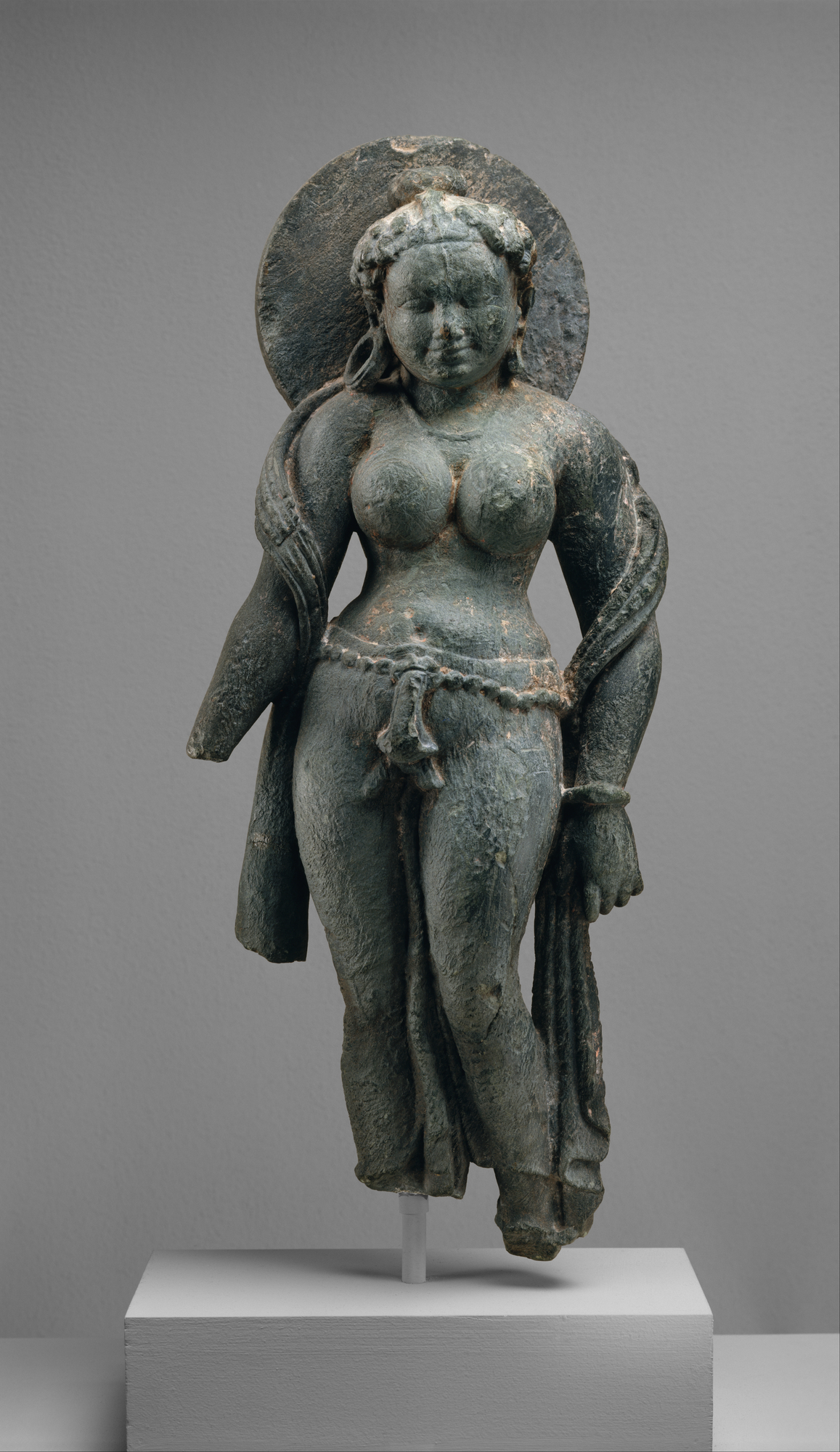
A murti of mother goddess Matrika, from Rajasthan 6th century CE

=== Traditions and forms of worship ===
Major Hindu traditions such as Vaishnavism, Shaivism, Shaktism and Smartaism favour the use of murtis. These traditions suggest that it is easier to dedicate time and focus on spirituality through anthropomorphic or non-anthropomorphic icons. Hindu scriptures such as the Bhagavata Purana, state the eight varieties of murtis in verse 11.27.12:

The Deity form (pratimā) of the Lord is said to appear in eight varieties: stone, wood, metal, earth (clay or plaster), paint, sand, the mind, or jewels.

=== Consecration and the presence of the divine ===
According to some texts, artisans (silpins) or priests perform rituals to consecrate a murti in a temple. During consecration rituals, mantras are recited to bring the divine life breathe (prana) within the murti. The eyes of the murti are usually painted last. Following this, the first look by the murti after being consecrated may be towards a mirror or sweet offerings before devotees participate in darsan and worship.

In Hinduism, a murti is not regarded as an independent deity separate from God, nor merely as a symbolic representation. Rather, after consecration, it is understood to be a sacred form through which God is fully present and accepts the devotion of worshippers. Thus, in major Hindu sects such as Vaishnavism, Murtis are not merely "representations" of God but are understood as a "focus" or "locus" of God's presence. In this understanding, God is believed to be truly present in the Murtis.

According to Sri Vaisnava tradition, which is associated with Ramanuja, a consecrated temple murti is considered to be an arcavatara, which is one of the 5 forms of Vishnu. Sri Vaisnava theology holds the view that God assumes a physical form without changing his divine nature with this allowing devotees to approach him through worship and to seek his divine grace.

A literal translation of murti as "idol" is incorrect when "idol" is understood as a superstitious end in itself. Just as a photograph of a person is not the person themselves, a murti is an image but it is not merely regarded as the material from which it is made from (i.e wood, clay, etc). In many Hindu traditions however, a consecrated murti is understood to be a sacred embodiment or presence of the deity through which devotees offer worship and receive divine grace, rather than serving solely as an emotional or symbolic reminder. When a person worships a murti, it is assumed to be a manifestation of the essence or spirit of the deity, the worshipper's spiritual ideas and needs are meditated through it, yet the idea of ultimate reality or Brahman is not confined to it.

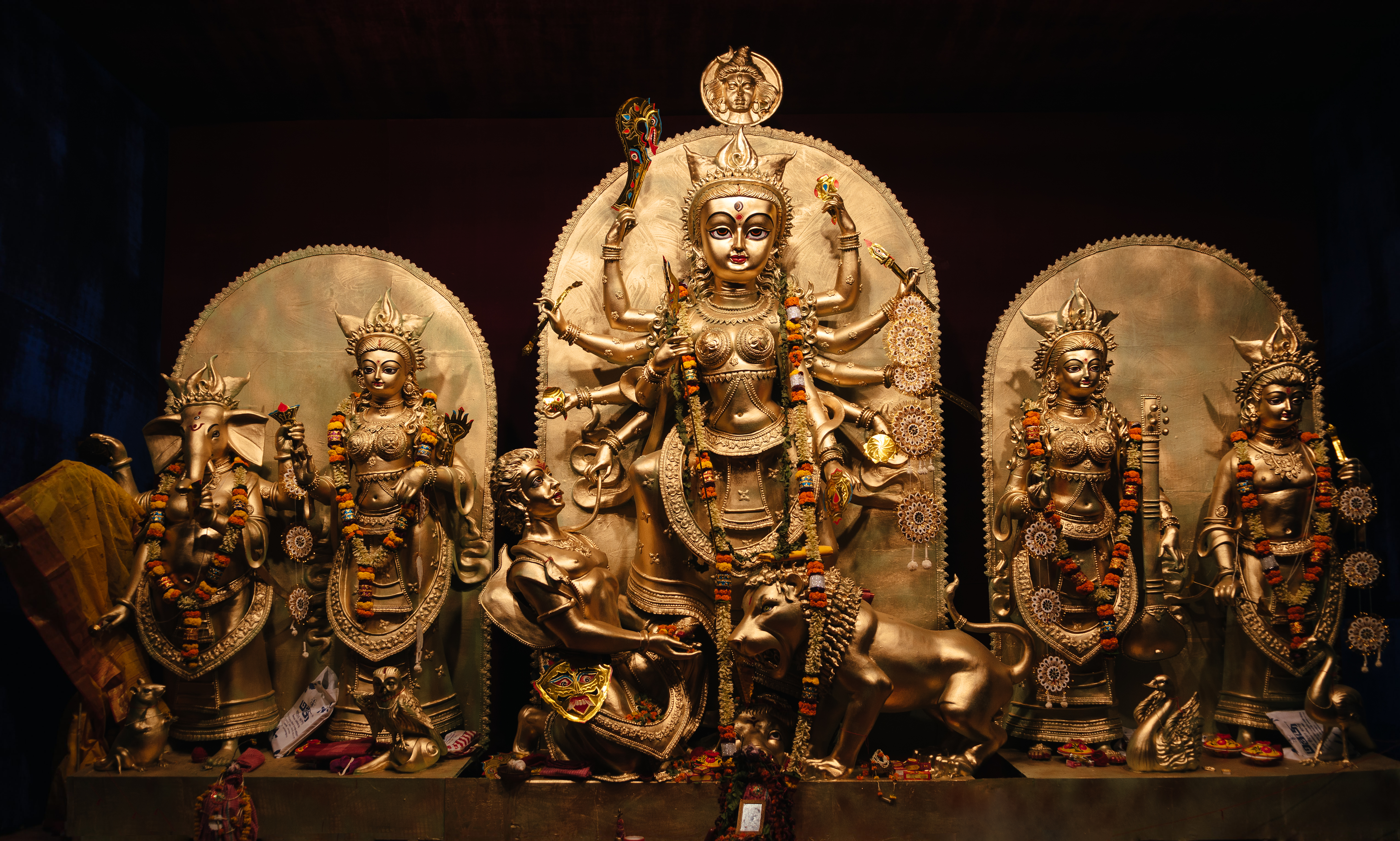
Goddess Durga and a pantheon of other gods and goddesses (Ganesh, Lakshmi, Sarasvati, Kartik) being worshipped during Durga Puja, North Kolkata

=== Devotional practices ===
Devotional (bhakti movement) practices are centered on cultivating a deep and personal bond of love with God, often expressed and facilitated with one or more murti, and includes individual or community hymns, japa or singing (bhajan, kirtan or arti). Acts of devotion, in major temples particularly, are structured on treating the murti as the manifestation of a revered guest, and the daily routine can include awakening the murti in the morning and ensuring that it "is washed, dressed, and garlanded."

In traditions like Vallabha's Pustimarga, devotional service (seva) is organised around 8 daily viewings (darsan) that reflect the deity's in the form of a murti's daily routine from morning to evening. Devotees can adjust the murti's clothing, decoration and offerings according to the corresponding season based on the time of the year. Practices include applying cooling sandalwood paste and using light clothing during the months of summer or offering cooked rice during the Annakuta festival. Devotees believe that the murti receives the offering before it is distributed as blesses food (prasad).

=== Forms of worship and religious perspectives ===
Some Hindu traditions describe both the external worship of a murti (bahya-puja) and internal worship through mental reflection (manasa-puja). In some interpretations of Advaita Vedanta, worship of a personal form of God (saguna brahman) prepares the mind for knowledge of the formless absolute (nirguna brahman). Gaudiya Vaisnava teachings also describe a development from formal devotional practice (vaidhi-bhakti) to natural devotion (raganuga-bhakti), which may include mentally reflecting on divine pastimes (lila-smarana) of Radha and Krishna. Some historical Sanskrit texts like Varahamihira's Brhat Samhita and various Agamas (traditional ritual texts and temple manuals for murti consecration and worship), link the materials used to make murtis with particular worldly benefits. For example, they link wood and clay with long life and prosperity, silver with fame, copper with family growth, and stone with stability and land ownership.

In Vaishnavism, the building of a temple for the murti is considered an act of devotion, but non-murti symbolism is also common wherein the aromatic tulsi plant or Saligrama is an aniconic reminder of the spiritualism in Vishnu. These puja rituals offered to the murti correspond to ancient cultural practices for a beloved guest, and the murti is welcomed, taken care of, and then requested to retire.

An image in Hinduism cannot be equated with a deity, and the object of worship is the divine, whose power is inside the image, and the image is not the object of worship itself, Hindus believe everything is worthy of worship because it contains divine energy emanating from the one god. According to the Agamas, the bimba murti (स्थूलमूर्ति / बिम्बमूर्ति) is different from the mantra murti (मन्त्रमूर्ति) from the perspective of rituals, gestures, hymns and offerings.

Some Hindu denominations, like Arya Samaj and Satya Mahima Dharma, reject idol worship.

=== Modes of worshipping ===
Worship of a murti involves various modes and rituals. Before a murti is worshipped, a ritual known as prana pratishta is conducted. This ritual is performed to invoke the presence of the god or goddess into the physical form of the murti. In temples, this ceremony is a one-time event for a specific murti. In domestic rituals, the deity is invited to reside in the murti through avahana (invocation) each time a puja is conducted and then dispersed back at the end of the puja. Adorning a murti is a mode that allows devotees to express love for the deity and visually and experientially connect with the nature of the god or goddess. In worship at a temple, the significant moment is when the adorned murti is revealed, and worshippers take darshan by witnessing the fully adorned murti.

== Role in history ==
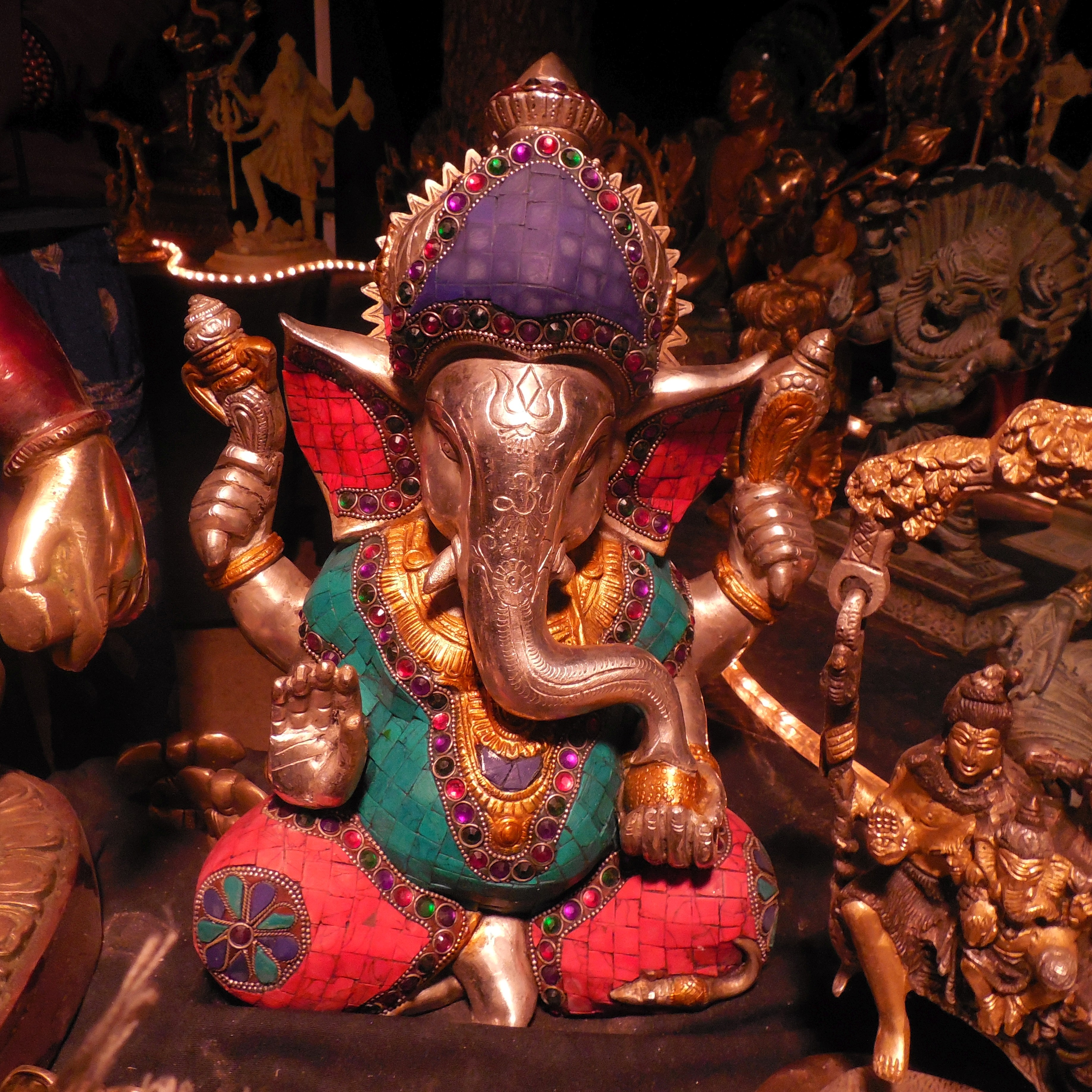
A collection of modern-day murti featuring the elephant-headed God, Lord Ganesha

Murti and temples were well established in South Asia, before the start of Delhi Sultanate in the late 12th century CE. They became a target of destruction during raids and religious wars between Islam and Hinduism through the 18th century.

During the colonial era, Christian missionaries aiming to convert Hindus to Christianity wrote memoirs and books that were widely distributed in Europe, which Mitter, Pennington, and other scholars call fictionalized stereotypes, where murti were claimed as the evidence of lack of spiritual heritage in primitive Hindus, of "idolatry and savage worship of stones", practices akin to Biblical demons, calling murti monstrous devils or eroticized bizarre beings carved in stone. The British Missionary Society with colonial government's assistance bought and sometimes seized, then transferred murti from India and displayed it in their "trophies" room in the United Kingdom with the note claiming that these were given up by Hindus who now accept the "folly and sin of idolatry". In other instances, the colonial British authorities, seeking additional government revenue, introduced Pilgrim Tax on Hindus to view murti inside major temples.

The missionaries and orientalist scholars attempted to justify the need for colonial rule of India by attacking murti as a symbol of depravity and primitiveness, arguing that it was, states Tanisha Ramachandran, "the White Man's Burden to create a moral society" in India. This literature by the Christian missionaries constructed the foundation of a "Hindu image" in Europe, during the colonial era, and it blamed murti idolatry as "the cause for the ills of Indian society". By 19th-century, ideas such as pantheism (the universe is identical with God or Brahman), contained in newly translated Sanskrit texts were linked to the idolatry of murti and declared as additional evidence of superstitions and evil by Christian missionaries and colonial authorities in British India.

The polemics of Christian missionaries in colonial India triggered a debate among Hindus, yielding divergent responses. It ranged from activists such as Dayananda Saraswati who denounced all murti, to Vivekananda who refused to denounce murti and asked Hindus in India and Christians in the West to introspect, that images are used everywhere to help think and as a road to ideas, in the following words,

Superstition is a great enemy of man, but bigotry is worse. Why does a Christian go to church? Why is the cross holy? Why is the face turned toward the sky in prayer? Why are there so many images in the Catholic Church? Why are there so many images in the minds of Protestants when they pray? My brethren, we can no more think about anything without a mental image than we can live without breathing. By the law of association, the material image calls up the mental idea and vice versa.

— Vivekananda, World Parliament of Religions

Religious intolerance and polemics, state Halbertal and Margalit, have historically targeted idols and material symbols cherished by other religions, while encouraging the worship of material symbols of one's religion, characterizing the material symbols of others as grotesque and wrong, in some cases dehumanizing the others and encouraging the destruction of idols of the others. The outsider conflates and stereotypes the "strange worship" of the other religions as "false worship" first, then calls "false worship" as "improper worship and false belief" of pagan or an equivalent term, thereafter constructing an identity of the others as "primitive and barbarians" that need to be saved, followed by justified intolerance and often violence against those who cherish a different material symbol than one's own. In the history of Hinduism and India, states Pennington, Hindu deity images (murti) have been a religious lens for focusing this anti-Hindu polemic and was the basis for distortions, accusations and attacks by non-Indian religious powers and missionaries.

== Significance ==
Ancient Indian texts assert the significance of murti in spiritual terms. The Vāstusūtra Upaniṣad, whose palm-leaf manuscripts were discovered in the 1970s among remote villages of Orissa – four in Oriya language and one in crude Sanskrit, asserts that the doctrine of murti art making is founded on the principles of origin and evolution of universe, is a "form of every form of cosmic creator" that empirically exists in nature, and it functions to inspire a devotee towards contemplating the Ultimate Supreme Principle (Brahman). This text, whose composition date is unknown but probably from late 1st millennium CE, discusses the significance of images as, state Alice Boner and others, "inspiring, elevating and purifying influence" on the viewer and "means of communicating a vision of supreme truth and for giving a taste of the infinite that lies beyond". It adds (abridged):

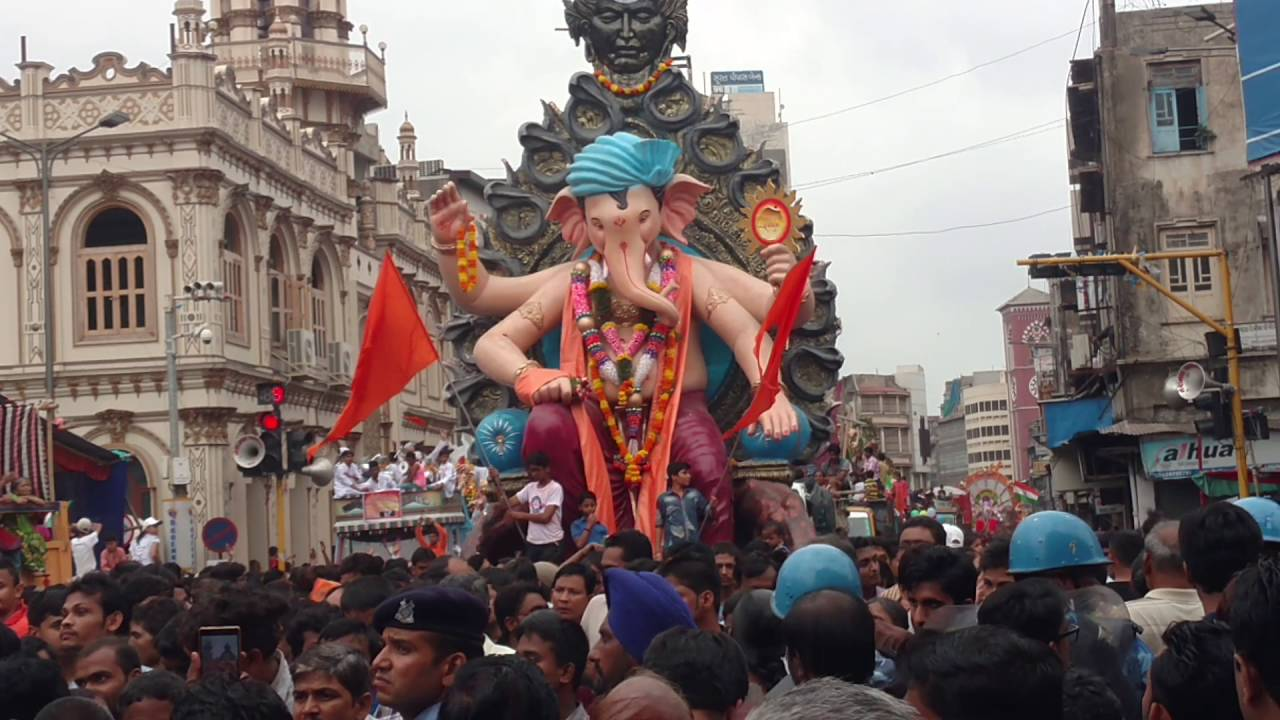
A Ganesha idol during a visarjan in Surat.

From the contemplation of images grows delight, from delight faith, from faith steadfast devotion, through such devotion arises that higher understanding (parāvidyā) that is the royal road to moksha. Without the guidance of images, the mind of the devotee may go astray and form the wrong imagination. Images dispel false imaginations. [... ] It resides within the consciousness of "Rishis" (sages), who possess the ability to perceive the essence of all created things in their manifested forms. They observe the various attributes, the divine and the demoniac, the creative and the destructive forces, engaged in their eternal interplay. It is this vision of Rishis, of the gigantic drama of cosmic powers in eternal conflict, from which the Sthapakas [Silpins, murti, and temple artists] drew the subject matter for their work.

— Pippalada, Vāstusūtra Upaniṣad, Introduction by Alice Boner et al.

In the fifth chapter of Vāstusūtra Upaniṣad, Pippalada asserts, "from tattva-rupa (essence of a form, underlying principle) come the pratirupani [images]". In the sixth chapter, Pippalada repeats his message that the artist portrays the particular and universal concepts, with the statement "the work of the Sthapaka is a creation similar to that of the Prajapati" (that which created the universe). Non-theistic Jaina scholars such as Jnansundar, states John Cort, have argued the significance of murti along the same lines, asserting that "no matter what the field – scientific, commercial, religious – there can be no knowledge without an icon", images are part of how human beings learn and focus their thoughts, icons are necessary and inseparable from spiritual endeavors in Jainism.

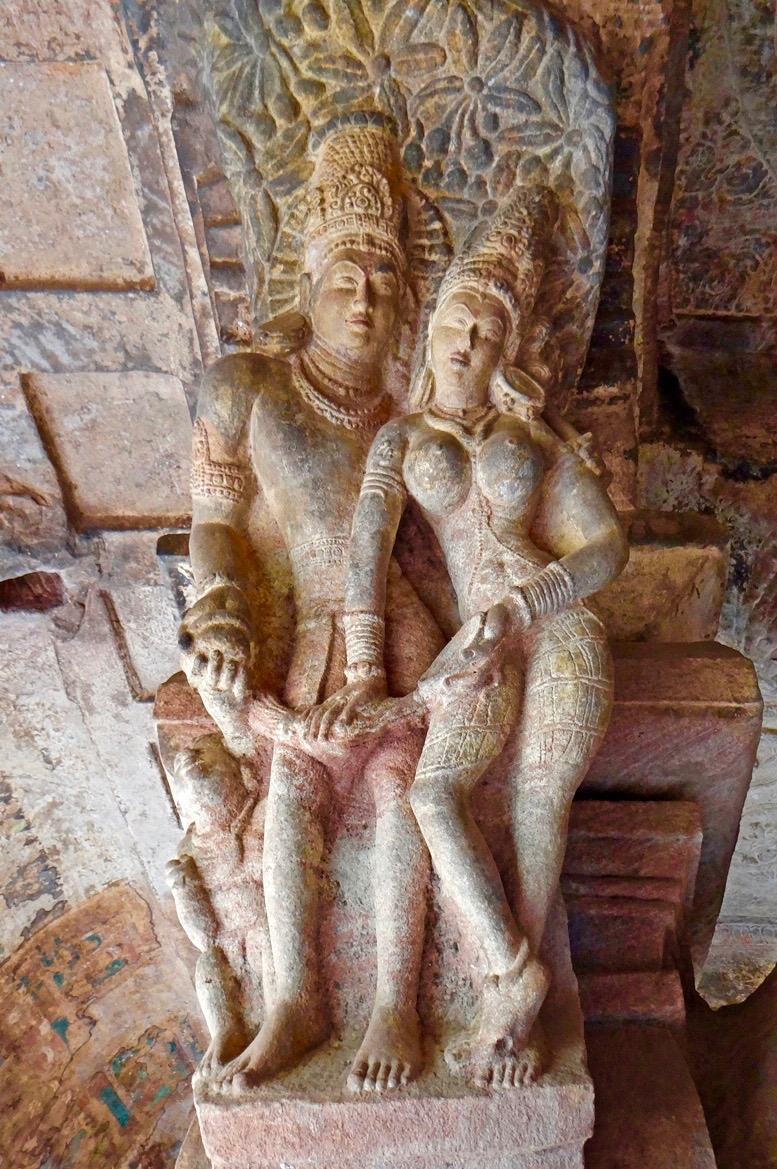
6th-century murti carvings, Badami cave temples, Karnataka

While murti are an easily and commonly visible aspect of Hinduism, they are not necessary for Hindu worship. Among Hindus, states Gopinath Rao, one who has realized Self (Soul, Atman) and the Universal Principle (Brahman, god) within himself, there is no need for any temple or divine image for worship. For those who have yet to reach this height of realization, various symbolic manifestations through images, idols, and icons as well as mental modes of worship are offered as one of the spiritual paths in the Hindu way of life. This belief is repeated in ancient Hindu scriptures. For example, the Jabaladarshana Upanishad states:

शिवमात्मनि पश्यन्ति प्रतिमासु न योगिनः |
अज्ञानं भावनार्थाय प्रतिमाः परिकल्पिताः || ५९ ||
- जाबालदर्शनोपनिषत्

A yogin perceives god (Siva) within himself,
images are for those who have not reached this knowledge. (Verse 59)

— Jabaladarsana Upanishad,

== See also ==
- Hindu iconography
- Hindu deities
- Ishtadevata
- Thangka
- Utsava
