= Prajñāvarman =

Buddhist author

Prajñāvarman (Tibetan: shes rab go cha) within early medieval literature, was an 8th-century Buddhist writer. He lived during the reigns of the Pala king, Gopala I and the Tibetan emperor Trisong Detsen, under whose auspices he came to Tibet. He was a contemporary of Jinamitra.

== Works ==
Prajñāvarman contributed to the translation of 77 Buddhist works from Sanskrit into Tibetan and is the author of three commentaries preserved in the Tengyur, namely the Devātiśāyastotraṭīkā (lha las phul du byung pa'i bstod pa gnyis kyi 'grel pa), the Udānavargavivara, and the Viśeṣastavaṭikā (khyad par du 'phags pa'i bstod pa'i rgya cher bshad pa) a commentary on Udbhaṭasiddhasvāmin's Viśeṣastava. The Viśeṣastavaṭikā was translated into Tibetan by Rin-chen-bzang-po (958-1055) and Janārdhana. The Sanskrit original is now lost.

Among his translations is the Abhayapradā-nāma-aparājita ('Phags pa gzhan gyis mi thub pa mi 'jigs pa sbyin pa) co-translated with Ye shes sde (published as Tôh. no. 708 and no. 928). Derge Kanjur, vol. TSA, folios 176v.1-177v.6.)
