= Viśeṣastava =

Buddhist stotra by Udbhaṭa-sidhi-svāmin

The Viśeṣa-stava is a Buddhist stotra by the author Udbhaṭasiddhasvāmin and has pride of place as the text that opens the Tibetan bsTan 'gyur. Originally written in Sanskrit, it was extensively propagated and sung. It was written to demonstrate the superiority of Buddhism over tirthikas. It has long been only known from its Tibetan translation (in the 9th century by the efforts of Sarvajñadeva and the Tibetans Rin-chen-mchog (d. 840) and Dpal-brtseg Rakṣita). Now, it is also known in a Sanskrit version thanks to Johannes Schneider and Liu Zhen's study. At the time of its translation into Tibetan, the Indian pandita Prajñāvarman wrote a commentary on it which immediately follows it in the bsTan 'gyur.
