= Vidyananda =

Vidyananda was a Digambara logician, scholar and Jain monk in Pataliputra. He was born in 750 AD and died in 800. He wrote Ashtasahasri which is a commentary on Samantabhadra's Devagamastotra. Madhvacharya, a Hindu philosopher has mentioned Vidyananda. Another digambara acharya with the same name flourished in the 20th-century India.

== Sources ==
- Nakamura, Hajime (1983), A History of Early Vedānta Philosophy, vol. 2 (First ed.), Motilal Banarsidass, ISBN 9788120806511
- Vidyabhusana, Satis Chandra (2006) [1920], A History of Indian Logic: Ancient, Mediaeval and Modern Schools, Motilal Banarsidass, ISBN 81-208-0565-8
