= Varangacharita =

Jainist Sanskrit text by Jagasimhanandi between 7th–9th centuries CE

Varāngacharita (Sanskrit: वरांगचरित), or "The deeds of Varānga", is a Sanskrit poetic work (or kāvya) believed to have been composed by the poet Jatasimhanandi in the 7th-9th century CE period. It contains 31 chapters and is associated with Jainism. Although it has not conclusively been established, the author may have been stylistically influenced by Aśvaghoṣa.

== Theme and plot ==
Varāngacharita is a novel that covers the life and times of a fictional prince, Varānga, to elucidate the principles and ethics of Jainism. It is in large part a heroic adventure narrative, though discussion of Jain doctrine is woven into the book.

=== The beginning (cantos I-II) ===
The story begins in Uttamapura, the capital of a fictitious kingdom called Vinita, ruled by King Dharmasena of the Bhoja dynasty. The king has many wives, including Gunavati (his favorite wife) and Mrigasena. The kingdom is rich and well-ruled, and the people are fond of the arts (especially, the theatre). Queen Gunavati has a son, Varānga, who grows to be handsome, brave, compassionate and well-educated in the arts and sciences. When he is of age, matches for him are suggested. He marries Princess Anupama of Samriddhapuri (also a fictitious kingdom) and other women. However, he does not marry another prospective bride, Princess Sunanda, his cousin and the daughter of King Devasena of Lalitapuri.

=== Exposure to Jainism and princely rivalry (cantos III-XI) ===
Varadatta, the disciple of the Tirthankar Neminath, visits Uttamapura and camps in a park. He preaches to an audience that includes the king, Prince Varānga, and many townspeople about nirvana and the obstacles to it. Varānga is much impressed and approaches the disciple-monk for further discourse, which results in Varānga taking the vows of right conduct and becoming a Jain layperson. The king is in turn impressed by Varānga's righteousness and confirms him as the heir apparent. Varānga's brother, Prince Sushena (who is Queen Mrigasena's son), attempts to oppose this conferment accompanied by some other princes, but is blocked by the king's ministers, led by a minister called Dhivara.

=== Conspiracy, the yakshi, the forest tribes and the merchants (cantos XII-XV) ===
When news of Varānga's confirmation as heir-apparent reaches the Queens' assembly, Queen Mrigasena immediately summons her son (Prince Sushena) who informs her that he had opposed the appointment, but was himself checked by minister Dhivara. It turns out that Dhivara is an old ally of Queen Mrigasena and owes loyalty to her. She summons him and demands that he instigate a revolt against Varānga. However, Varānga has grown too popular and powerful, so Minister Dhivara conspires to get rid of him deceitfully.

In a hippodrome outside the capital, Dhivara tricks Varānga into riding a horse that has been trained to suddenly bolt. When the horse gallops off, no other rider is able to catch-up. The horse exits the kingdom and keeps going through dense forest, eventually plunging to its death in a deep well. Varānga survives by grabbing on to a vine and climbs out. He is lost, exhausted and injured. He feels both grief (at separation from his family) and anger (at Minister Dhivara's betrayal), and reflects on some of the Jain lessons he has learned. He is stalked by a tiger, but fortuitously escapes it. As he takes a refreshing dip in a lake, his leg is seized by a crocodile. He cannot free himself, but the crocodile is driven-off by an invisible yakshi when he prays to the Jain divinities. She materializes as a beautiful woman and asks him to join her in love. When he declares that he is bound by the vows of conduct he made to Varadatta, she vanishes skyward after revealing that she too is Varadatta's disciple and was merely testing him.

Wandering on, Varānga stumbles into a band of Pulindas, a tribe that inhabited and controlled the vast forests of the Vindhyas region, and captured. The author clearly regards them as a barbarians who decide to sacrifice Varānga to their goddess at dawn. Just then, a snake-bitten tribesman returning from the hunt falls unconscious. When Varānga succeeds in saving him, the Pulindas' attitude softens. They apologize and free him, giving him directions back to his own country.

He sets out, but begins to reflect on his state of filthy dishevelment and is overcome with doubt on how he will be received: perhaps his enemies will mock him and friends pity him. Running into an armed merchant caravan, he is suspected of being a spy for bandits and seized. In those days, much of India was densely forested and transit between towns was dangerous. Merchant convoys were often attacked by wild animals, brigands and forest tribespeople, and consequently included many heavily armed mercenaries that could even fight pitched battles. Despite Varānga's refusal to disclose his name, who he is or how he came to be there, the convoy-leader, Sagaravriddhi, finds him too cultured to be a bandit-spy. Soon, scouts report that Pulinda tribesmen are gathering in the forest to attack the convoy. Sagaravriddhi exhorts his men to prepare for the coming battle. Varānga offers to help but is judged too soft and not taken seriously.

The Pulindas attack with ferocity. There is much bloodshed as the merchants fight back before they begin to falter. Enraged, Varānga fights even harder and faces-off against the Pulinda chief's son, Kala, whom he kills. Varānga then confronts the Pulinda chief himself, whom he also kills after a long fight. The Pulindas to flee, but Varānga himself is left seriously wounded. The merchants tend to him and shower him with wealth. Since he refuses to disclose his name, they simply call him Kashchidbhata ("some soldier"). Tales of his heroism spread and the convoy finally reaches Sagaravriddhi's home country, Lalitapura. This kingdom is also the home of Princess Sunanda, Varānga's cousin and onetime prospective wife (whom he had not married). Sagaravriddhi and his wife take Kashchidbhata (Varānga) as their son, and secure the rank of merchant-captain for him.

Back in Uttamapura, the search organized for Varānga fails, finding only his torn-off ornaments and the dead horse in the well. He is presumed dead. Anupama (Varānga's wife) wants to kill herself, but is stopped by the king, and receives Jain instruction on nirvana, the impermanence of things, compassion for all beings, and dharma. She and Varānga's other wives dedicate themselves to Jain meditations, though they do not become nuns.

=== A new life (cantos XVI-XXI) ===
Varānga's new-found peace is shattered when Lalitapura is invaded by King Indrasena of Mathura. Lalitapura's fortified capital is besieged, leaving the royal council with a dilemma. Should they endure a long siege (attempting to drive dissension in the invaders' ranks and inciting mountain tribes to attack from the rear) or fight a last-ditch ferocious battle to break free? Varānga knows King Devasena is his uncle, and feels dharma-bound to offer his assistance without disclosing his identity. Sagaravriddhi takes him to King Devasena, who is skeptical of a merchant fighting but agrees to take Kashchidbhata-Varānga's help. The king says he will give Kashchidbhata half his kingdom and his daughter Sunanda's hand should Kashchidbhata succeed. In the ensuing conflict, Kashchidbhata kills the invading king's son and wounds the king himself. The invading army flees.

The triumphant King Devasena, now faced with the prospect of giving his daughter in marriage to an unknown soldier, demands to know his real name and lineage. Kashchidbhata refuses and says he is not insisting on Sunanda's hand. The king relents and Sunanda is married to Kashchidbhata, along with her sister Manorama (who has fallen in love with Kashchidbhata).

Back in Uttamapura, King Dharmasena has installed the conspiring prince Sushena as the new heir-apparent. However, Sushena is defeated when Uttamapura is invaded and its capital besieged by another king, Bakularaja. The besieged King Dharmasena sends an appeal for help to his kin, King Devasena. Learning of this, Kashchidbhata reveals his true identity of Varānga to King Devasena, who embraces him as his nephew. Varānga then leads an army to his homeland's rescue, and the invaders flee. Varānga reunites with Anupama and his other wives. He then moves to establish a new empire at Anarta (modern-day Gujarat), which has lain waste since the death of Lord Krishna and where he becomes a fine and mighty king. He promotes the Jain faith, building temples and monasteries - acts which the author specifically cites as helpful to laypeople who are otherwise engaged in a worldly life.

=== Salvation (cantos XXII-XXXI) ===
Anupama (now queen) begins to engage Varānga on the nature of things and Jain philosophy. This part of the book describes their happy married life, but also contains strong critiques of Brahmanism, hereditary castes and Buddhism. Violence towards animals is especially deplored. Queen Anupama bears Varānga a son, Sugatra, who grows up strong and handsome. Varānga becomes aged, installs Sugatra on the throne and becomes a Jain monk. His queens become nuns. Many of Varānga's associates, including his foster father Sagarvriddhi, join him as Jain monks. Varānga passes away, attaining nirvana. His wives and associates do not attain nirvana, but do transition to a higher state of existence, as deities.

== See also ==
- Jain literature
