= Madhava-kara =

Ancient Indian medical text

Madhava (or Madhava-kara) was a 7th-century or early 8th-century Indian Ayurveda practitioner who wrote the Rug-vinischaya, also known as the Madhava Nidana, which soon assumed a position of authority. In the 79 chapters of this book, he lists diseases along with their causes, symptoms, and complications. He also included a chapter on smallpox (masūrikā).
