= Bhagavadajjukam =

7th-century Sanskrit farce by Bodhayana

The Bhagavadajjukam (Sanskrit; translated as The Ascetic and the Courtesan or The Hermit and the Harlot) is a Sanskrit farce composed in the 7th century CE, usually attributed to Bodhayana. However, inscriptional and scholarly evidence indicate that the play was written by the Pallava king Mahendravarman I, who also wrote a prominent farce known as the Mattavilasa Prahasana. It is one of the two earliest surviving examples of a satirical play (or prahasana, one of the ten types of plays described in the treatise Natya Shastra) in Sanskrit literature. Featuring witty exchanges, an episode about the transmigration of souls and a discussion on sannyasa in Hindu dharma, the comical play was intended to satire heretical doctrines

== Characters ==
- Parivrajaka – monk or master: learned and possesses supernatural powers
- Shandilya – disciple: hedonistic and sees monkhood as an easy way to good food
- Vasantsena – courtesan
- Parabhrithika, Madhukarika - Vasantasens's maid-servants.
- Ramilaka – courtesan's lover
- A quack doctor
- Yamaduta, messenger of the lord of death, Yamaraja

== Synopsis ==
Like all Sanskrit plays, Bhagavadajjuka opens with a prayer followed by dialogue between the director and an actor, setting the stage for the play. In this case, the actor is the Vidushaka, who is both the companion of the protagonist and the comic relief. It segues into the play proper with a suggestion that they play the monk and his disciple.

The play proper begins with a discussion between the monk and the disciple who speaks, in turns, irreverently and mistakenly. Walking along, they enter a grove where they see a courtesan named Vasantasena, accompanied by two maidservants. One of them is sent to bring the courtesan's lover. A Yamaduta, tasked with reaping the soul of a Vasantasena, arrives, turns into a snake, and bites the courtesan. The disciple, attracted to the courtesan, grieves over her while the remaining maidservant goes to fetch the courtesan's mother. To teach the disciple a lesson, the monk transfers his (monk's) soul into the courtesan, who then awakens and starts talking in the manner of the monk. The mother arrives, and sends the maidservant to fetch a physician.The courtesan's lover arrives, followed by the physician, each with one of the maidservants. The Yamaduta, who has taken the soul of the wrong Vasantasena, returns, and finding the body occupied, puts Vasantasena's soul into the monk's body. Now the monk's body starts acting like the courtesan. Confusion and farcical situations ensue. After some time, the monk accedes to the Yamaduta's plea and switches bodies. Everything returns to normal, and all go on their way.

== Translations ==
The play had been largely forgotten until the 20th century except in Kerala where it had been part of the traditional Sanskrit theater form known as Koodiyattam. After it became more widely known in the 20th century, it was translated into Telugu in 1924 by Veturi Prabhakara Sastri, who then got it published in the Devanagri script through Vavilla Press in 1925. In 1932, the play was translated into Italian, L'asceta transmutato in etèra, by the Indologist Ferdinando Belloni-Filippi. The first English translation of the play was published by the Dutch Indologist J. A. B. van Buitenen in the journal Mahfil (now Journal of South Asian Literature) in 1971 with the title The Hermit and the Harlot.

== Performance history ==
In 1967, the play was directed in Hindi by Shanta Gandhi at the National School of Drama. It has often been adapted to be performed as Koodiyattam, a traditional performing art of Kerala. The play continues to be performed in many regional Indian languages. In 2011, Kavalam Narayana Panicker directed the play at the Ernakulam Town Hall in Kochi. Other recent productions were held in 2013, 2015, 2016, 2019, 2020.
