= Jatasimhanandi =

Jain Sanskrit poet

Jatāsimhanandi (Sanskrit: जटासिंहनन्दि), also called Jatasimha Nandi or Jatila Muni (जटिलमुनि), was a Jain Sanskrit poet believed to have lived in the 6th-9th century CE period. He lived in the modern-day Indian state of Karnataka.

Jatasimhanandi was the author of several kāvya poetic works, including the adventure narrative of Varangacharita. Although it has not conclusively been established, he may have been stylistically influenced by Aśvaghoṣa.

== See also ==
- Varangacharita
