= Acharya Vamana =

Vamana

Personal life
- Born: latter half of the 8th centurynnbv
- Died: first half of the 9th century

Religious life
- Religion: Hinduism
- Philosophy: Kavyalankara Sutra

Acharya Vamana (latter half of the 8th century – early 9th century) was an Indian Rhetorician.

Vamana's investigation into the nature of a Kāvya is known as theory of Riti.

Vamana's Kavyalankara Sutra is considered as the first attempt at evolving a philosophy of literary aesthetics. He regarded that riti is the soul of Kavya. He presented his formulations in the form of Sutras.
