= Ālambana =

Ālambana (Sanskrit:आलम्बन), is a Sanskrit term which variously means – support, foundation, supporting, base, sustaining, cause, reason, basis, or the five attributes of things, or the silent repetition of a prayer, or the natural and necessary connection of a sensation with the cause which excites it, or the mental exercise practiced by the yogis in endeavouring to realize the gross form of the Eternal.

== Vedic implication ==
In Indian philosophy ālambana refers to the objective basis of a perception or sensation; according to which philosophy Kārana (cause) and all attendant emotional conditions are known as Vibhavas which are of two kinds – a) Ālambana, the personal and human object and substratum, and b) Uddipana, the excitant. Ālambana may further be divided into asraya and visaya, Radha is asraya and Krishna is visaya; Radha, as the devotee, experienced greater pleasure than Krishna who remained the object of her veneration. Visaya is the potential object of a perceptual consciousness, ālambana is the objective basis which can even be the cause of perceptual or cognition support for a perceptual error. The Nyaya school does not consider the object in front to be the ālambana of the illusory cognition but rather the interfering external element with its own characteristics. The best ālambana for the upasana of Brahman is Om.

In Vedic parlance, ālambana is also known as skambha i.e. the pillar of strength; God is the pillar of strength; it is the objective contemplation which lends support to the mind in its travel Godwards.

== Rasa implication ==
In the Indian theory of Rasa, Uddipana is the excitant or determinant which inflames sentiments or emotions, and ālambana is that on which the sentiment hangs i.e. ālambana is with reference to the sentiment which arises as the link between a sentiment and the cause which excites it. In Rasa process, the nature or object is said to be visibly present before the asraya as an excitant but the object that arouses emotions is usually imagined by the poet or dramatist; the mere presence of vibhava impels the configuration of Pratibha (the intuitive outcome of wisdom or knowledge) to change it in no time. As per the Rasa of Heroic devotion in compassion the enhancing excitants include transitory emotions such as impatience, understanding and happiness, and Krishna in some disguised form is offered by the hero, motivated by kindness, his own body. Yuddhisthira had made sacrificial offerings to Krishna.

== Yogic implication ==
With the aid of self-supported yoga or ātmālambana yoga, Ishvara can be seen in two ways i.e. dual and non-dual, or can be seen as fourfolded. Ālambana refers to inner support and yoga refers to self-discipline; ātmālambana yoga is the discipline of objectifying the non-self with the aid of the self when the negated-self becomes the object of the self.

Patanjali while defining Sleep which is a vritti of Buddhi, just as the waking state and the dream states are, tells us:

अभावप्रत्ययालम्बना तमोवर्त्तिर्निद्रा (Yoga Sutra Samādhipada 10)

"Deep sleep is the absence of all impressions resulting from opacity in that which is mutable in human-beings (citta)."

Here, he has used the word, ālambana, to mean support or based on i.e. absence of impressions is supported / based on inertia.

== Buddhist implication ==
According to the Yogacara phenomenology the ālambana condition, whether immediate direct or remote, means if there exists a dharma it will have a distinct appearance, the mind will sometimes correspond with it (lakshana) for that dharma to be cognized and perceptually grasped. This condition leads to the awakening which results in the ending of the eight consciousnesses and replacing them with four enlightened cognitive abilities. The Buddhist consider ālambana as a cause same as hetu, samanantara and adhipati, they consider it to be the object-condition which is taken as the cause in the production of knowledge and mentals, such as citta and caitta. According to Nagarjuna there are three motivational contexts of love and compassion viz, sattva-ālambana, motivated by the similarity of one's self with other selves, dharma-ālambana, motivated by the sameness of psycho-physical elements, and ānalambana which is not motivated by these two i.e. which is independent of motivational context. Xuanzang in the context of Dignāga's statement with reference to the eighth consciousness explains that the seeds or virtualities of the eighth consciousness produce the actual consciousness and also the objective base (ālambana) of actual consciousness.
