= Amulo =

Catholic Archbishop

Archbishop Amulo of Lyon
- Installed: c. AD 841
- Term ended: c. AD 852
- Predecessor: Agobard
- Successor: Remigius of Lyon

Personal details
- Denomination: pre-Schism Church

Amulo (also known as: Amalo, Amulon, Amolo, Amularius) served as Archbishop of Lyon from 841 to 852 AD. As a Gallic prelate, Amulo is best known for his letters concerning two major themes: Christian–Jewish relations in the Frankish kingdom and the Carolingian controversy over predestination. He was ordained as archbishop in January 841.

Amulo was a disciple of his predecessor Agobard and inherited many of his ideas. Amulo collaborated closely with both Remigius of Lyon, who later succeeded him, and Florus of Lyon who served as scribe for Amulo; hence it is not always clear which of Amulo's letters were actually penned by him. He also worked with Hincmar Archbishop of Reims regarding anti-Jewish policies and the debate with Gottschalk of Orbais over predestination.

Like his predecessor, Amulo was unable to bring about anti-Jewish policies into the Carolingian Empire. However, he actively pursued "a policy of coercion against pro-Jewish Christians," within his diocese, and his sermons were imbued with anti-Jewish teachings. His work was influential during the mid-ninth century – most notably his Contra Judaeos and his involvement in the Council of Meaux–Paris in 845. These decrees were not ratified by Charles the Bald, since his magnates saw them as interfering with the traditional Carolingian policies regarding Jews; the Canons proposed at Paris–Meaux sought to revive earlier Visigothic laws, including Canon LXXIIII which prohibited Christians from "showing favour to Jews." Nevertheless, both Amulo and his predecessor were instrumental in spreading anti-Jewish attitudes in the Carolingean court, which eventually sparked changes in "both exegesis and canon law."

== Influences ==
Carolingian theologians and scholars were widely influenced by Jewish texts during the ninth century. Figures such as Rabanus Maurus, Angelomus of Luxeuil, Claudius of Turin and Theodulf of Orléans demonstrate a thorough knowledge of Jewish teachings, but this generated an anti-Jewish reaction. Several contemporaries of Amulo – including Rabanus and Angelomus – held the traditional view of Jews as a people who refused to accept Christ due to their blindness.

Knowledge of Hebrew and Greek was uncommon; it is likely that Jewish texts were merely cited to affirm the orthodoxy of the Church, and did not rely on accuracy. Amulo was an exception to this rule: he had at least a working knowledge of Hebrew, and his complex theological arguments affirm his knowledge of Hebrew scripture and Jewish scholarship.

Most of Amulo's works also directly refer to the Church Fathers, including Saint Augustine, Jerome, and Gregory the Great. He mostly wrote on issues concerning Jewish mysticism, predestination, and Halakha which were not known to the patristic authors. These works were often quoted to support polemical arguments. Similarly, Amulo demonstrates his knowledge of Jewish texts to strengthen his position. It is clear from his writings that Scripture was insufficient; a wide base of Church scholarship fueled debates between dioceses over Christ's nature, Jewish tradition, and superstition. Both Amulo and Agobard strove to counter Jewish influence in Francia, and worked to convince Christians that they ought to limit their interaction with the Jewish population of Lyon.

In both Agobard and Amulo's works, they express concern that Christians preferred to attend Jewish services rather than those of their own priests. Amulo objected to Jewish scholars Josephus and Philo in 844–845, and his writings were echoed by both Angelomus and Rabanus Maurus; these texts were becoming more popular amongst Christians than Scripture. There was also concern that close "friendly" contact between Jews and Christians in Lyon would lead to a widespread conversion to Judaism within their diocese.

== Predestination ==
Amulo was included among many prelates working to oppose Gottschalk of Orbais (c. 870) and his teachings of two-fold predestination. By 864, Gottschalk had settled in Friuli under the patronage of Eberhard and was covertly spreading his doctrine in Italy and Noricum. He had followers in Saxony, Germany, and later in the Balkan regions. From the writings of Rabanus, it is clear that Gottschalk had gained sufficient popularity to pose a theological threat to the Church – and not merely in the Carolingian heartlands of Francia.

Gottschalk challenged both the structure and doctrine of the Church. He was raised in a monastery at Fulda, which was a focus for missionaries in Germany and central to Louis the Pious' vision of a "Christian" empire. As a monk, Gottschalk twice defied the Order of Saint Benedict: first, in 847 at a council at Mainz, he nearly succeeded in freeing himself from monkhood, when by rule he was born to serve from pueritia for life. Rabanus sought to ensure that Gottschalk did not set a precedent for other monks, and called a second council at the Diet of Worms in 829. Consequentially, Gottschalk was again "forced to take the monastic vows."

Second, Gottschalk defied the Benedictine law of stabilitas loci, by leaving his monastic duties for southwest Italy. Primarily, his motivations were political. Gottschalk was a disciple of Ebbo, Archbishop of Reims, and this connection rapidly became controversial. Ebbo sided with Lothair I against Louis during the civil war of 833, and was deposed when Louis returned to power. Ebbo spent the remainder of his life attempting to replace his successor, Hincmar. Around 833–835 Gottschalk was relocated to Orbais; but he was accused of conspiring with Ebbo against Hincmar and needed to escape persecution. Rigbold of Rheims briefly served as archbishop before Hincmar was appointed, from 835 to 845. Rigbold ordained Gottschalk as a missionary without the consent of bishop Rothad of Soissons, where Orbais was located. Gottschalk's ordination disrupted both monastic law and social order; he was later prosecuted at the 849 council in Quierzy (see Councils of Quierzy) for disturbing "both ecclesiastical and civil affairs."

The case of Gottschalk is relevant to Amulo's prelature in two ways: first, Gottschalk was an erudite theologian, and his Augustinian view of predestination cited the same Church Fathers present in Amulo's works. Notably, he was also supported by Prudentius of Troyes, in opposition to Hincmar. It is clear that Hincmar also began to have doubts: he wrote to five prelates from the church in Lyon for advice, including Amalarius. Amalarius was appointed by Louis to replace Agobard as archbishop in Lyon, where he served from 833 to 838. Among other prelates, Amalarius sided with Eriugena against Gottschalk in the predestination debate. However, his liturgical reforms – emphasizing the ceremonial importance of both the Eucharist and Mass – were seen as excessive by the Church. He was deposed and accused of heresy at the same council which condemned Gottschalk in 838. Agobard actively condemned Amalarius's liturgical methods, and was able to regain imperial favour. He was restored as archbishop in Lyon, and Amulo succeeded him upon his death.

Royalty was almost always involved in matters of faith. In 849, King Charles the Bald himself began to ponder the issue of predestination. However, the draconian punishments administered by Hincmar at the council of Quierzy in 849 clearly affirm the power of Church hierarchies in ninth-century Francia. Florus of Lyon was highly critical of the verdict; it also clearly deviated from canon law.

Gottschalk remained "convinced that his ideas were orthodox," and he persisted in his controversial doctrines. There was no definitive end to the predestination debate, and the Church maintained its position. Gottschalk raised a long-dormant theological question, but the 860 synod in Tusey merely reaffirmed the Church's initial position. Hincmar and his supporters were at an impasse with Gottschalk – there was no room for dialogue, and Gottschalk was incarcerated at Hautvillers in 849 until his death. It was during this time that Amulo began to correspond with him. The tone of Amulo's letters imply that he may have viewed the stability and unity of the Church as a prerogative over the question of predestination. His Epistula ad Gothescalcum monachum or "Letter to Monk Gottschalk" is more reminiscent of paternal advice than theological attack. Similarly, his Opusculum Gratiam itaque Dei on "The Grace of God" asserts that predestination should primarily be viewed as an affirmation of Christian humility: it should not lead to "despair".

== Anti-Judaic polemic ==
In both his anti-Judaic writings and his scholarship, it is unlikely that Amulo was motivated solely by anti-Semitism. He was mainly concerned by the power and influence held by Jews under the administration of King Charles the Bald. These tolerant policies towards Jews were a continuation of those of Emperor Louis the Pious. They allowed economic concessions and legal protection of Jews under the lex Judaica and were a sore point for some prelates in Frankish Gaul. Agobard epitomises the conflict of interest between the Church and Frankish state, and this tension carried over into Amulo's work. Agobard was known for his anti-Jewish campaigns and was involved in the revolt against Louis in 833. When Louis regained the throne in 834, Agobard was sent into exile and temporarily replaced by Amalarius of Metz, former archbishop of Trier, who was more favourably disposed towards Jews. When Amalarius was condemned for heresy in 838, Agobard was reappointed as archbishop; despite his return to imperial favour, both Agobard and Amulo persisted in their anti-Judaic polemic.

Amidst the chaos preceding the 843 Treaty of Verdun, Archbishop Hincmar of Rheims drafted a proposal with three primary aims: to reinforce ecclesiastical power by preventing laymen from becoming prelates; to reclaim all property that had been previously owned by the church; to eliminate all privileges granted to Jews during Louis' reign. Amulo was instrumental in the 846 Meaux-Paris council in the Diocese of Meaux, which planned the implementation of Hincmar's anti-Jewish policies. This council was a Church attempt to exercise power independently of the royal court – but Charles formally rejected their proposal at Épernay in 846, and made it clear that he intended to uphold his father's "pro-Jewish" policies. Amulo is listed among the attendees at this council.

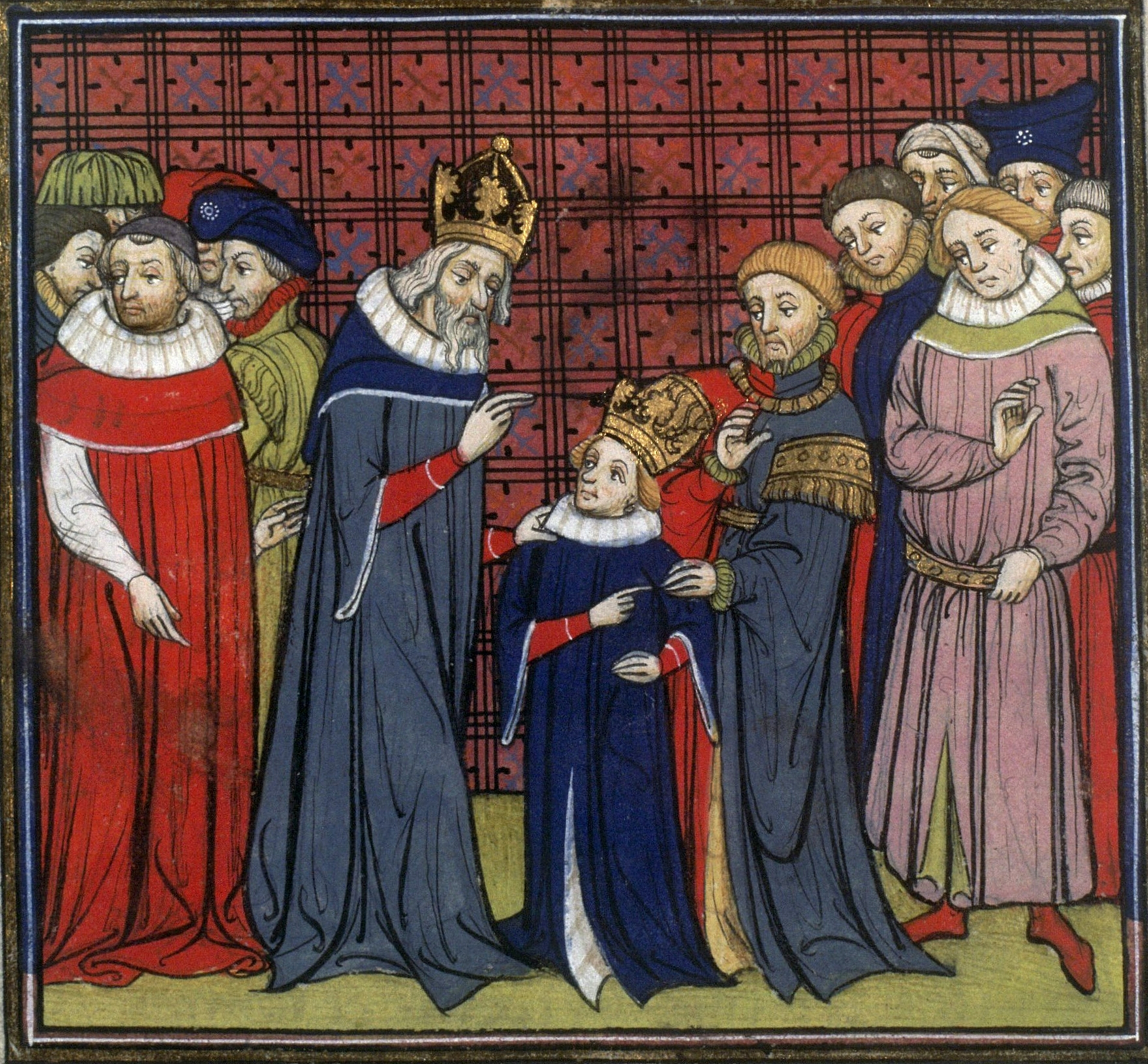
Louis the Pious continued Charlemagne's favourable policies regarding the Jewish population.

Amulo experienced the same conflict of interest with Charles the Bald as his predecessor Agobard had with Louis the Pious. His treatise Liber contra Judaeos ad Carolum regem or "Letter Against Jews to King Charles" comprehensively lays out his anti-Jewish theses.

It is clear from Amulo's writings that Christian–Jewish interaction in Lyon was common. Amulo had three major concerns within his diocese: first, he was concerned with the popularity and influence of Jewish scholarship and anti-Christian texts. Jewish rabbis were also permitted to hold public services, and Amulo worried that Christians in Lyon were more interested in Jewish teachings than attending services within his diocese. Second, Jews could hold public office and encourage Christian or pagan conversion with secular incentives. This was particularly sensitive in matters of slavery or tax collection; in Contra Judaeos, Amulo asserts that "Jewish tax collectors" were converting Christians, particularly in less populated areas. Jews no longer had to pay a "religious tax", and in some cases, Jewish merchants were exempt from paying tolls or other imperial dues. Third, Jews and Christians commonly shared traditions or daily practices. Many Christians chose to "work on Sunday" and "rest on the Jewish Sabbath", in part because Louis the Pious had changed market days to accommodate Jewish merchants. It was also common for Christians to celebrate Jewish feast days and eat kosher foods. Amulo was furthermore concerned over the liturgical versus doctrinal influence of Jewish beliefs – he worried that the "mysticism" of Midrashim and "Talmudic traditions" would translate into Christian worship.

=== Jewish scholarship ===
Jewish texts were widely circulated in the Carolingian world – many of them, most notably the Toledot Yeshu, were blatantly anti-Christian. Amulo could likely read Hebrew or corresponded with those who could. Public worship for Jews was also legalised during the Carolingian period – these reforms were subsequently upheld by Louis and his son Charles. Amulo is very specific in his criticisms of Hebraic scripture, but there are also cases where he conflates the Cthib (text-based) and Qri (oral) bibles. This suggests that he could have relied on hear-say sources and not on texts themselves.

The works of Jewish scholars were often popularised and highly respected; Charlemagne had allowed a strong Jewish intellectual presence in the empire, most notably with the scholar Kalonymus in Mainz and Isaac, imperial ambassador to Harun al-Rashid. The emperor set a precedent for cultural and economic policies towards Jews, and a strong Judaic tradition rooted itself in Carolingian Gaul. This continued in the courts of Louis the Pious, where appreciation for both Josephus and Philo of Alexandria may account for their popularity throughout the Carolingian period; indeed, Josephus was treated almost like another "church father". Louis also allowed discussion of the "relative merits" of Christianity and Judaism to enter into intellectual circles.

Amulo reiterates the Jewish origin of both Josephus and Philo in his Liber contra Judaeos, and expresses his anxiety that these works were not to be overvalued by Christians. In the case of Josephus, it is possible that Amulo was reacting to the popularity of his work rather than its actual content. Among Josephus' works, two were widely read in their Latin forms: his Jewish War and Antiquities. Not only did his Antiquities contain an extensive anecdote in praise of Christianity in his Testimonium Flavianum, but the most popular translation of Josephus' history – now called "Hegesippus" for its author Pseudo-Hegesippus – openly discriminates against the Jewish people.

The Jewish-Christian dispute quickly became a political one, with the conversion of the deacon Bodo, in 838. This was an uncomfortable affirmation of the clergy's worst fears: that the Jewish cultural and theological presence was sufficiently persuasive to earn Jewish converts, even in positions of power. Although Bodo resided in the court at Aachen, it was the clergy of the western kingdom who schemed to bring about anti-Jewish legislation. Bodo was a Christian noble, active in the Carolingian courts – not only did his conversion set a dangerous precedent, but rumours that he encouraged Muslim persecution of Christians in Spain exacerbated the issue. In 848, there was also a suggestion that Jews assisted the Vikings in Bordeaux; the Annals of Saint Bertin (see Annales Bertiniani) also attest that Barcelona was "handed over" to the Muslims in 852, although later sections of the Annals were written by Hincmar himself.

=== Jewish merchants and slave trade ===
The Second Council of Mâcon in 581–582 held that Jews could not own Christian slaves; this was reaffirmed at the Council of Châlons in 743. However, Jewish merchants held considerable wealth and influence in the ninth century. In contrast to both Roman and canon law, Louis permitted Jews both to employ Christians and purchase pagan slaves. Jews were also elected to governmental positions, and could earn honores or imperial favours. Louis also amended the law obligating the release of any slave converted to either Judaism or Christianity. Slave owners were prohibited from active "proselytism" but their slaves could only convert to either religion with their consent. Under these conditions, it was more likely that slaves would become Jewish converts rather than Christian ones.

Agobard was rightly concerned that slaves would be tempted to accept Judaism; this had already occurred in Lyon. After a Jewish-owned pagan girl was converted by her master, Agobard baptized her as a Christian. He faced strong resistance from the Jewish population in Lyon, and was held legally accountable for this act by the magister Judaeorum in 822. This was a humiliating defeat for Agobard; it confirmed the strong Jewish influence present in the imperial court. Louis even provided the Jews with a diploma, bearing his imperial seal, to affirm their "victory" against Agobard. In 827, Agobard composed On Jewish Superstitions with the support of numerous prelates. He explicitly tells Christians to abstain from selling Christian slaves to Jewish merchants. It is clear from Agobard's letters that this practice was sufficiently common to generate anxiety in Lyon, and this carried over into Amulo's work.

Charles the Bald permitted many economic advantages for the Jews; as mint-masters, tax collectors, and bank owners, the Jews held significant financial power in the Frankish kingdoms. In the case of Radhanite merchants, flourishing economic activity in southern Gaul also extended into the Mediterranean and parts of the Emirate of Córdoba. As Islamic forces claimed hegemony over the Mediterranean, Christian trading networks out of Syria had largely disappeared – leaving a strong power gap in the market for Carolingian Jews. It is here that many Jewish merchants spread their faith, and rumours that Gallic Christian slaves were being sold across the borders became a major controversy. There are many stories of Christians slaves being "redeemed" from their owners and there were also rumours of "kidnapping" and forced castration by Jewish slave owners. Charles was aware of this power imbalance: he attempted to reform Louis' policies, most nobly prohibiting Jewish bankers to accept Christian slaves as "collateral" for unpaid debts. Amulo was rightly concerned that the Jewish monopoly over tax-collection and trade put Charles into a tight political position; in his Contra Judeos, Amulo encourages Charles to reconsider a more "anti-Jewish policy."

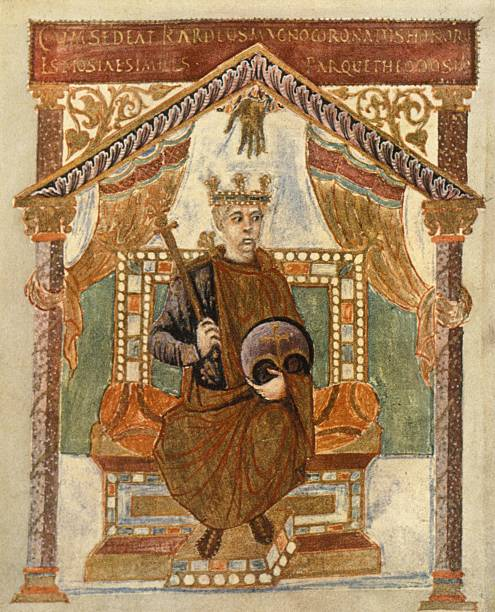
Charles the Bald in old age; picture from his Psalter.

== Relics and icons ==
In his Epistula ad Teodboldum to Theutbald I (bishop of Langres), Amulo advises the Bishop on how to deal with the bones of an unknown saint that were brought to the Church of St. Bénigne in Dijon. This letter was probably written between 841 and 844, since it refers to Bishop Bartholomew of Narbonne, who died in 845. Not only was Amulo concerned about the "ridiculous manner" in which these two dubious monks delivered the relics, but certain miracula had started to occur after the bones were buried at St. Bénigne (see Dijon Cathedral). These "miracles" did not cure or heal visitors of the relics: several women within the diocese reported getting "strikings", though they showed no signs of outward injury. They also experienced fits, resembling those of modern epilepsy. According to Amulo, Bishop Martin of Tours once avoided visiting a popular shrine, since he did not know the name of the martyr buried at the site. Amulo was careful not to denounce the sanctity of the relics while he is concerned about the likelihood of them being unholy; he finally advised Theobald to remove them and bury them elsewhere. Bishop Theobald most likely listened to this advice, since the relics are not mentioned further in surviving sources.

Amulo's Epistula ad Teodboldum was written during a time of civil war, in which the diocese of Dijon was sensitively positioned. Louis the German and Charles the Bald had engaged in combat within the area, and the subsequent devastation profoundly affected the diocese. Amulo was deeply concerned about the effects that the relics had on families: most of the fits occurred in women and young girls, keeping them from their duties and generating more anxiety within the parish. Amulo was not against relics, but he asserted the importance of venerating saints in "proper" ways, and that such things should be limited to the "legitimate days". He offered a solution to these new relics, insisting that church ceremony – Mass, confessions, burials – would restore the people through "everyday miracles of everyday life".

== Major works ==
=== Contra Judaeos ===
By 843, the archbishopric of Lyon was part of Middle Francia under the kingship of Lothair. The Epistola seu liber contra Judaeos was dedicated to Charles the Bald in West Francia, approximately dated c. 843–846. It was written to persuade the king to approve the anti-Jewish policies proposed at the Council of Paris-Meaux.

Many of Amulo's letters were sent through Archbishop Hincmar of Reims. Hincmar had assembled the 843 gathering at which Charles the Bald made a formal pact of peace, or foedus concordiae, with the Church and nobility, known as the Treaty of Coulaines. Hincmar knew that Amulo was well-versed in Jewish teachings. Hincmar selected Amulo to expose the Jewish threat to the king with his Epistula. He wanted to use the foedus concordiae as leverage between Church and state in implementing anti-Jewish policies.

Contra Judaeos can be divided into three themes: first, Amulo provides a list of Jewish "blasphemies" against the Christian faith. He refers directly to sections of the Toledot Yeshu and Hebrew bible, and cites scripture to support his argument. Secondly, Amulo provides a critique of Jewish scholars Josephus and Philo. He then goes further, describing the "ill behaviour" of the Judaic people in the Frankish Empire; most of which was directly taken from Agobard's writings. He concludes Contra Judaeos with a caution to all Christians, and uses historical examples to set a leading precedent for Charles the Bald.

In his Epistula, Amulo carefully lays out his theological argument against Jewish scripture. Christianity was not valued as a legitimate denomination in these texts; it was merely seen as a deviation from the true Jewish faith. Apostles were openly called "apostates" and the Gospel was being taught as "the revelation of iniquity" or havongalion by Jewish priests. The Toledot Yeshu and other Jewish works also contested the legitimacy of Jesus's birth, and these claims are addressed in great detail by Amulo. Primarily, two versions of the Messiah are addressed in the Contra Judaeos. The first attests that Jesus was merely a descendant of King David; he was later enslaved and kept chained to a cave wall outside of Rome. Attended by a Jewish doctor named Joshua ben Levi, the wounded man transforms into an old sage. He carries a sapphire stone, and promises to distribute such stones among the people once he has liberated them. The second asserts that the Messiah is a man called Ben Ephraim, or son of Joseph, destined to perish in combat against Gog and Magog.

Amulo deconstructs both heresies, citing both from the Old Testament and Hebraic texts. Amulo notes that the Toledot re-words lines of the Vulgate bible, specifically Isaiah 53:5 and Zechariah 12:10, to support their claim. The Carolingians were instrumental in standardizing the Vulgate; this often involved cross-referencing with Hebrew scripture. Florus was active in revising the psalter used at Lyon, and cites "the Septuagint, Jerome, and 'The Books of the Hebrews'" in his revisions. Amulo also cites Jerome in his Contra Judaeos, who interpreted Ezekiel 4:4–6 to say that the first captivity should have been limited to 430 years; only half of the estimate that Amulo gives. He also cites Scripture to provide evidence against the Jewish re-telling of Christ's crucifixion, specifically referring to the time of day. Amulo's attention to detail makes it clear that the anti-Christian polemic had a strong public presence in Lyon, and was sufficiently influential to warrant his concern.

The Contra Judaoes was an opportunity for Amulo to deconstruct the many Jewish and anti-Christian texts that were in circulation during his time; it is also a testament to the breadth of his scholarship. He routinely cites the Church Fathers, including Augustine, Jerome, and Pope Gregory the Great. He also uses historical precedents to support his argument, including the laws of Theodosius I, Valentinus, Constantine, and Childebert I. He mentions the conversion of the Jews by King Sisebut in 612, and notes that Pope Gregory praised King Reccared for his anti-Jewish laws (see The Third Council of Toledo). It is clear that Amulo did not intend to convert Jews, but to fully remove them from the empire: citing St. Paul's Epistle to the Romans, he insists that Christians may "mourn" Jews, but should not try to "save them."

=== Letters ===
Epistula ad Gothescalcum monachum or "Letter to Monk Gottschalk" (850–851) (PL 119:422; MGH Epist. 5, 1898-9/1978, 368–78) addressed seven theses of Gottschalk of Orbais. An anonymous postscript entitled "Grace of God" or Opusculum Gratiamitque Dei has led some scholars to believe the work was written by Florus of Lyon, although both the letter and opusculum are ascribed to Amulo. The letter mostly focuses on the debate of predestination. According to the letter, Gottschalk's writings were being circulated both among the dioceses and the public; his treatises also attacked bishops who were present at the 849 Council of Quierzy.

Epistula ad imperatorem de babtizandis Hebraeis or "Letter to the Hebrews on Baptism" (816, 822/825) (PL 119:422; MGH Epist. 5, 1898/1978, 239) was addressed either to Louis the Pious or to his son Lothair, and serves as an addendum to a list of canonical laws compiled by Florus of Lyon. Sources make the date of composition or authorship unclear: it has been attributed to both Amulo and Remigius. Attempts at dating the letter suggest it may have been written earlier by Agobard, or yet remains anonymous.

Epistula ad Teodboldum Lingonensem episcopum or "Letter to Theutbald Bishop of Langres" (841–844) (PL 116:77–84; MGH Epist. 5 1898-9/1978, 363–8) was written to Theutbald I regarding false relics which were being transferred from Italy to Dijon.

Contra Judaeos: Epistula contra Iudaeos ad Calorum regem, Liber contra Judaeos ad Carolum regemor or "Letter Against Jews to King Charles" (843–846) (PL 116:141-84; MGH Epist. 5 1898-9/ 1978, 361 n. 6) was first published under the name of Rabanus Maurus, in a Paris manuscript which is now archived in the Bibliothèque Nationale in France. It contains sixty chapters, some of which resemble direct copies from Agobard. It would likely have been compiled by Florus, but largely attributes its authorship to Amulo. For a more comprehensive summary of Contra Judaeos, see the above section.

=== Opusculum ===
Opusculum "Gratiam itaque Dei" or "The Grace of God" (PL 116:97–100; also 116:101–106) dates around the same period as both the Epistula ad Gothescalcum and Sententiae ex libris Augustini. Found without an attribution, its association with the aforementioned letters implies it was penned either by Amulo or Florus. It emphasises the grace of God and discusses both free will and predestination; it also iterates the promise of salvation for Christians and references the work of St Augustine.

Opusculum "Omnipotens Deus" or "Almighty God" (849) (PL 116:97–100; also listed under Florus: PL 119:95–102; 125:57–9) is dated just after Gottschalk of Orbais was condemned at Quierzy. It is written as a response to an unknown man regarding the issue of predestination and free will. It is included in the Patrologia Latina with Amulo's edits, and prefaces a work by Hincmar of Reims entitled On Predestination. Two copies of this text were in circulation – one of which has been attributed to Archbishop Herribald of Auxerre (828–57) and the other to Florus of Lyon.

Sententiae ex libris Augustini or "Arguments from the works of Augustine" (PL 116:105-40) contains twenty-two chapters commentating on the works of St. Augustine, specifically focusing on predestination and the will of God. It is included in the Patrologia Latina among Amulo's other works, but could also have been written by Florus.
