= Posidonius (bishop of Urgell) =

Posidonius (Catalan: Possedoni) was the bishop of Urgell in northern Spain between 814 and 823. He may have become bishop as early 803, the last year when Archbishop Leidrad was still clearly in control of the diocese following the ouster of Bishop Felix for heresy.

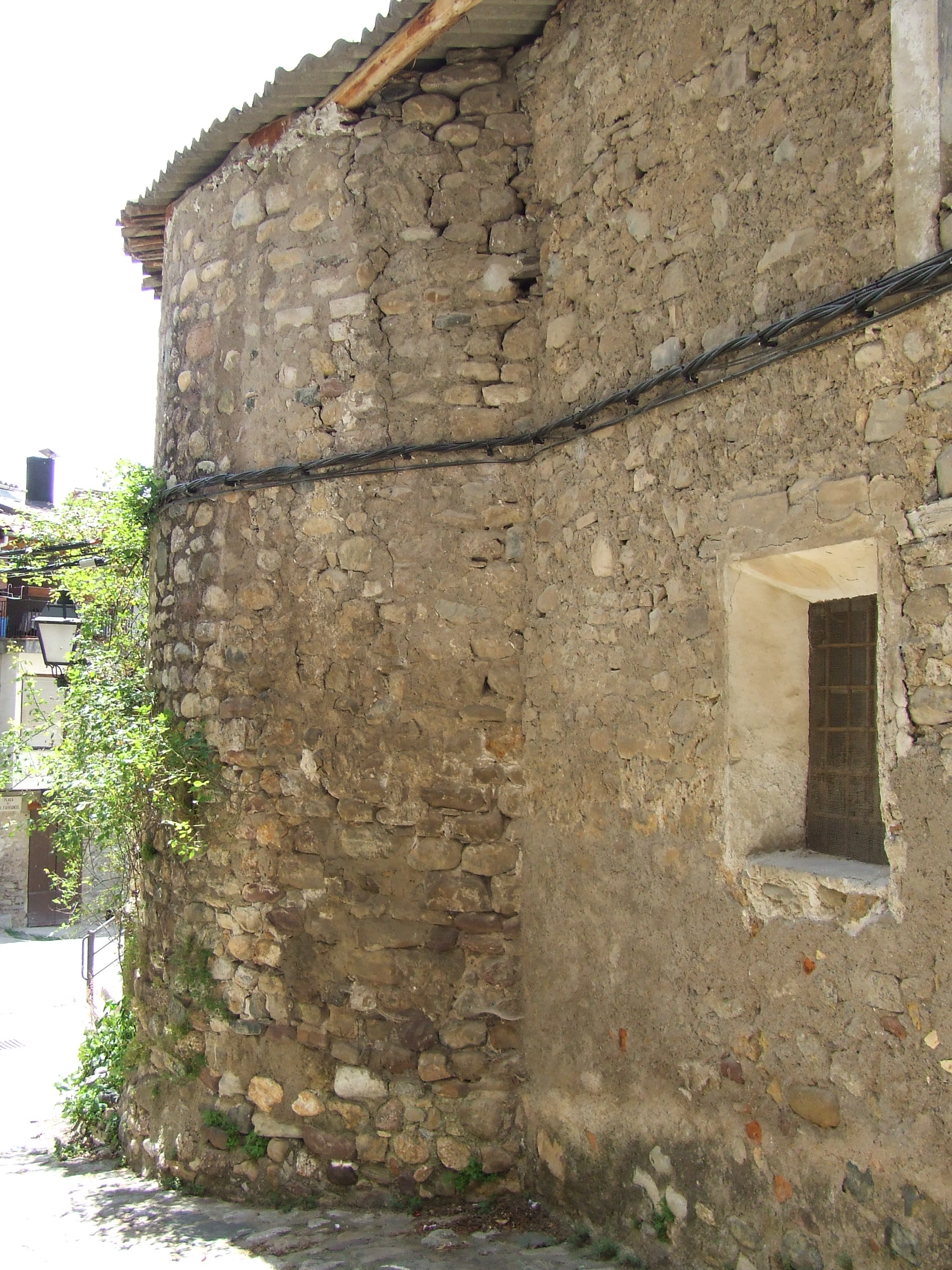
The monastery of Santa Maria de Gràcia de Senterada, which Posidonius rebuilt under the Benedictine rule

Posidonius was not a native of Urgell. Prior to becoming bishop, he was the first Benedictine abbot of Sant Sadurní de Tavèrnoles, appointed by the reformer Benedict of Aniane. A document of 1040 records that he gave some land he owned to the monastery when he became abbot. He procured a diploma from King Louis of Aquitaine (the future Emperor Louis I) permitting the construction of monasteries on fiscal lands. Possibly he was a former member of Louis's court.

Posidonius is recorded as bishop in a donation made by Fredelao, count of Cerdanya and Urgell, in 815 for the benefit of the monasteries of Sant Sadurní and Sant Esteve i Sant Hilari that Fredelao had built in Cerdanya on land he had received from the Emperor Louis. A supposed privilege issued to Posidonius by the Emperor Louis in 835 or 836 is a later forgery. The last authentic reference to Posidonius as bishop is a confirmation of immunity for the monastery of Santa Maria de Gràcia de Senterada issued by Count Matfrid of Orléans at the bishop's request on 21 June 823.
