= Immo (bishop of Noyon) =

Immo (died 859) was the bishop of Noyon from between 835 and 841 until his death at the hands of a group of Vikings. During the civil war that convulsed the Carolingian Empire following the death of Emperor Louis the Pious in 840, Immo supported the emperor's youngest son, Charles the Bald, from 841.

A letter to Immo from his archbishop, Hincmar of Reims, survives from 846. Hincmar was summoning Immo the consecration of Ermenfrid as bishop of Beauvais, which was taking place in time for Ermenfrid to attend the synod of Paris on 14 February 846. Another surviving letter of Hincmar instructs Immo to assist in the consecration of bishop Pardulus of Laon in 847.

In 859, probably late in August, according to the Annales Bertiniani, "Vikings attacked Noyon by night and took captive Bishop Immo and a number of other nobles, both clerics and layment." The bishop was killed "on the march", perhaps because he tried to resist or escape. The acts of the synod of Tuzey, which opened on 22 October 860, are signed by Immo and his successor, Raginelm. The contradictory signatures were already dismissed as a forgery by Hincmar. Nevertheless, some modern scholars have dismissed the Annales as mistaken and placed Immo's either between the opening of the synod and its closing (7 November) or after the synod (as late as 861).

== Sources ==
- Beck, Henry G. J. (1959). "The Selection of Bishops Suffragan to Hincmar of Rheims, 845–882". The Catholic Historical Review. 45 (3): 273–308.
- Nelson, J. L. (1992). Charles the Bald. London: Longman.
