= Posidonius (disambiguation) =

Posidonius or Poseidonios may refer to:

- Poseidonios the Macedonian (3rd century BC?), a siege engineer mentioned by Biton of Pergamon
- Posidonius (1st century BC), Stoic polymath
- Posidonius (bishop of Urgell), bishop between AD 814 and 823
- Posidonius (crater), a lunar impact crater
