= Agobard =

9th-century Spanish archbishop and saint

Saint Agobard

Archbishop
- Born: c. 769; Spain
- Died: 840 (aged 70–71)
- Feast: 6 June

Agobard of Lyon (c. 769 – 840) was a Spanish-born priest and archbishop of Lyon, during the Carolingian Renaissance. The author of multiple treatises, ranging in subject matter from the iconoclast controversy to Spanish Adoptionism to critiques of the Carolingian royal family, Agobard is best known for his critiques of Jewish religious practices and political power in the Frankish-Carolingian realm. He was succeeded by Amulo of Lyons.

== Early life ==
A native of Spain, Agobard moved to Lyon in 792. He was ordained as a priest c. 804, and was well-liked by the archbishop of Lyon, Leidrad (r. 799–816). At some point, Agobard was ordained as a chorbishop, or assistant bishop. Controversy arose in 814, when the aging Leidrad retired into a monastery, appointing Agobard as his successor. While Carolingian emperor Louis the Pious did not object to the appointment, some of the other bishops did, calling a synod at Arles to protest the elevation of a new bishop while the old bishop still lived. Archbishop Leidrad died in 816, and the controversy fizzled out, leaving Agobard as the new archbishop. Soon after taking office, he confronted several issues, which included opposing trials by ordeal, and, in 818, writing against Felix of Urgel's Spanish Adoptionist Christology.

== Anti-Jewish polemic ==
Agobard is notorious for his vocal attacks on the local Jewish population and their religious practices. Jewish communities living in the Frankish or Carolingian realm had been granted considerable freedoms under Louis the Pious, son of Charlemagne, including a prohibition on Christian proselytizing. Louis appointed a magister Iudaeorum to ensure Jewish legal protection, and did not force Jews to allow baptism for their slaves. Agobard found this last provision particularly galling, and wrote his first anti-Jewish tract on the matter: De Baptismo Judaicorum Mancipiorum (c. 823). For the rest of the decade, Agobard campaigned against what he saw as the dangerous growth in power and influence of Jews in the kingdom that was contrary to canon law. It was during this time that he wrote such works as Contra Praeceptum Impium (c. 826), De Insolentia Judeorum (c. 827), De Judaicis Superstitionibus (c. 827), and De Cavendo Convictu et Societate Judaica (c. 827). Agobard's rhetoric, which included describing Jews as "filii diaboli" ("children of the devil") was indicative of the developing anti-Jewish strain of medieval Christian thought. As Jeremy Cohen has claimed, Agobard's response was paradoxically both stereotypical and knowledgeable (he showed a great knowledge of contemporary Judaism, while maintaining and perpetuating stereotypes).

== Icons ==
In the 820s, a controversy emerged over the iconoclastic policies of bishop Claudius of Turin. This stance was opposed by Dungal of Bobbio at the request of Louis the Pious. Agobard, in his Book on Paintings and Images, came out in opposition to Dungal's method of using secular knowledge to justify veneration of images.

== Political problems ==
In the 820s, Agobard had already shown his willingness to challenge Louis the Pious on the subject of Jews and on secular holdings of church land. Agobard continued to confront the emperor, particularly on the issues of royal succession and the matter of land ownership. Agobard accused the emperor of abandoning his 817 Ordinatio imperii decree, which promoted an all-encompassing unity of church and empire. In both of the two rebellions against Louis, 830 and 833, Agobard supported the ill-fated revolt of Louis' son Lothair I. In 833, when Lothair launched his second revolt, Agobard published his support for Lothair once more in several works: A Comparison of Ecclesiastical and Political Government and Wherein the Dignity of the Church Outshines the Majesty of Empires and the Liber Apologeticus in defense of the rebelling sons of Louis.

== Exile and return ==
After Louis was restored to his power, backed by his sons Louis the German and Pepin I of Aquitaine, Agobard was suspended from his episcopate by the Council of Thionville and exiled, replaced by the chorbishop Amalarius of Metz (c. 775 – c. 850). During his tenure in Lyon, Amalarius worked to impose liturgical reforms upon the archdiocese of Lyon. Amalarius' reforms were characterized by a heavy reliance upon allegorical and symbolic representations within the Mass. Agobard, on the other hand, disdained Amalarius' reforms as "theatrical" and "showy" and favored a more plain liturgy. Amalarius' reforms were also opposed by Agobard's disciple Florus of Lyon; Amalarius was deposed and accused of heresy in 838. Agobard wrote three works against Amalarius: On Divine Psalmody, On the Correction of the Antiphonary, and Liber officialis. When he returned to Lyon, Agobard worked to roll back Amalarius' actions, with the support of Florus.

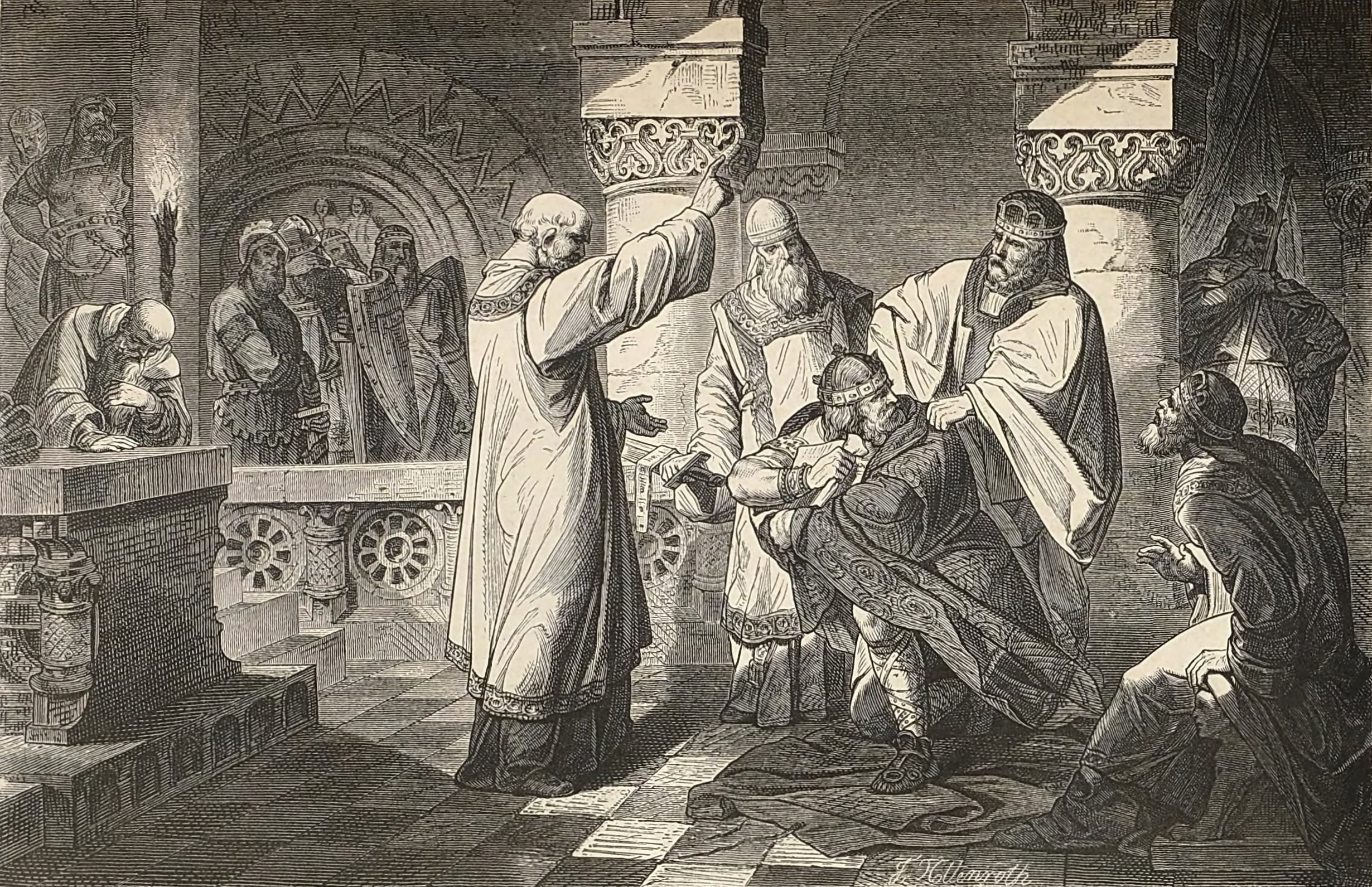
13 November 833, Ebbo, with Agobard of Lyon, presided over a synod at the Church of Saint Medard in Soissons (Louis de Pious)

== Other works ==
During his life, Agobard wrote more works on other issues, including several against pagan practices, two on the role of clergy, and a treatise on icons.

Agobard also wrote a treatise arguing against weather magic called De Grandine et Tonitruis ("On Hail and Thunder"). A passage in it mentions the popular belief in ships in the clouds whose sailors were thought to take crops damaged by hail or storms to their land of Magonia.

Many of his works were lost until 1605, when a manuscript was discovered in Lyons and published by Papirius Masson, and again by Baluze in 1666. Agobard's complete works can be found in Volume 104 of J. P. Migne's Patrologia Latina, and, in a more recent edition, in Van Acker's Agobardi Lugdunensis Opera Omnia.
