= Amalarius =

Frankish prelate and courtier

Amalarius (Note: Also Amalarius Mettensis (Amalarius of Metz), Amalarius Symphosius or Amalarius Fortunatus. His name in contemporary Latin comes in many variants—Amelarius, Amalerius, Amalharius, Hamelarius, Hamularius. Its original Frankish form may have been Amalheri or Amalhar.) (c. 775–c. 850) was a Frankish prelate and courtier, temporary bishop of Trier (812–13) and Lyon (835–38), and an accomplished liturgist. He was close to Charlemagne and a partisan of his successor, Louis the Pious, throughout the latter's tumultuous reign.

He was appointed the third archbishop of Trier in 811 by Charlemagne. In 813 he was sent as the chief Frankish ambassador to the court of Michael I Rhangabes at Constantinople. On Charlemagne's death in 814, Amalarius resigned his see.

In 831, Amalarius travelled to Rome to meet Pope Gregory IV and arrange a new Frankish liturgy. In 835, he replaced Agobard at the Synod of Diedenhofen. During Agobard's exile (c. 834) he was responsible for administering the Diocese of Lyon. He implemented liturgical reforms.

He wrote extensively on the Mass, including the Liber officialis (see plowboy trope) and the De ordine antiphonarii, and was involved in the great medieval debates regarding predestination.

We must rely on his enemy, Florus of Lyon, for an account of Amalarius' condemnation on the accusation of heresy at Quierzy, 838., which banned some of his works. Nevertheless, his writings form a good portion of our current documentation of the ninth century liturgies of the Western Church.

While the exact date of his death is not known, it is believed that it happened around 850 in Metz.
