= Jonas of Orléans =

French bishop

Jonas
- Bishop of Orléans
- In office: 818–843
- Predecessor: Theodulf of Orléans
- Successor: Agius

Personal details
- Born: c. 760 Aquitaine
- Died: 844

Jonas (c. 760–843) was Bishop of Orléans and played a major political role during the reign of Emperor Louis the Pious.

Jonas was born in Aquitaine. Probably a cleric by the 780s, he served at the court of Louis the Pious, who ruled as King of Aquitaine during the reign of his father, Charlemagne. In 817, Louis established his son Pippin as King of Aquitaine. Jonas served as an adviser to Pippin. The following year, Jonas was appointed Bishop of Orléans.

Jonas was a trusted servant of Emperor Louis, and a committed supporter of the Emperor in his conflicts with his sons. He also wrote to refute some of the iconoclastic teachings of Claudius of Turin at the request of the emperor. At the ecclesiastical council held in Paris in 825, Jonas presented the position of the Frankish clergy on Iconoclasm to Pope Eugenius II. He later wrote the treatise De cultu imaginum on the question. At a council in 829, again at Paris, he was a supporter of the rights of the Emperor over the clergy. He participated in councils at Worms in 833, Thionville in 835, and Aachen in 836.

== Works ==
Jonas's writings included:

- De cultu imaginum - work to refute some of the iconoclastic teachings of Claudius of Turin, edited by Karl Hampe in 1899 (dedication), and Jacques Paul Migne (Patrologia Latina, 106),
- De institutione laicali - an early example of mirror-of-princes writing, written for Matfrid, Count of Orléans, edited by Odile Dubreucq in 2012-2013, and Francesco Veronese in 2018,
- De institutione regia - another mirror work, was written for Pippin of Aquitaine, edited by Alain Dubreucq in 1995,
- Epistola concilii Aquisgranensis ad Pippinum regem directa - letter about church property, edited by Albert Werminghoff in 1906,
- Vita et Translatio s. Hucberti episcopi Leodiensis - life of saint Hubert of Liege, edited by Karl Hampe in 1899 (dedication), Ludwig von Heinemann in 1887 (translation), and Bollandists in 1887.

== Bibliography and Further reading ==
- Dubreucq, Alain (1995). Le métier de Roi: (De institutione regia) Jonas d'Orléans; ed. & trans. A. Dubreucq. Sources Chrétiennes no. 407 (in French). Paris: Éditions du Cerf. ISBN 2204052256. OCLC 802724000.
- Dubreucq, Odile (2012). Jonas d'Orléans: Instruction des laïcs Tome I. Sources Chrétiennes Nos. 549 (in French). Paris: Éditions du Cerf. ISBN 9782204099851. OCLC 1414154140.
- Dubreucq, Odile (2013). Jonas d'Orléans: Instruction des laïcs Tome II. Sources Chrétiennes Nos. 560 (in French). Paris: Éditions du Cerf. ISBN 9782204101639. OCLC 863120797.
- Amelung, Karl (1888). Leben und Schriften des Bischofs Jonas von Orleans (in German). Dresden: B. G. Teubner Verlag. OCLC 13404445.
- Herbermann, Charles, ed. (1913). "Jonas of Orléans" . Catholic Encyclopedia. New York: Robert Appleton Company.
- (in French) Riché, Pierre, Dictionnaire des Francs: Les Carolingiens. Bartillat, 1997. ISBN 2-84100-125-3
