= Siege of Paris (845) =

Viking attack on kingdom of the West Franks

Coordinates: 48°51′17″N 02°20′51″E

- Part of the Viking expansion
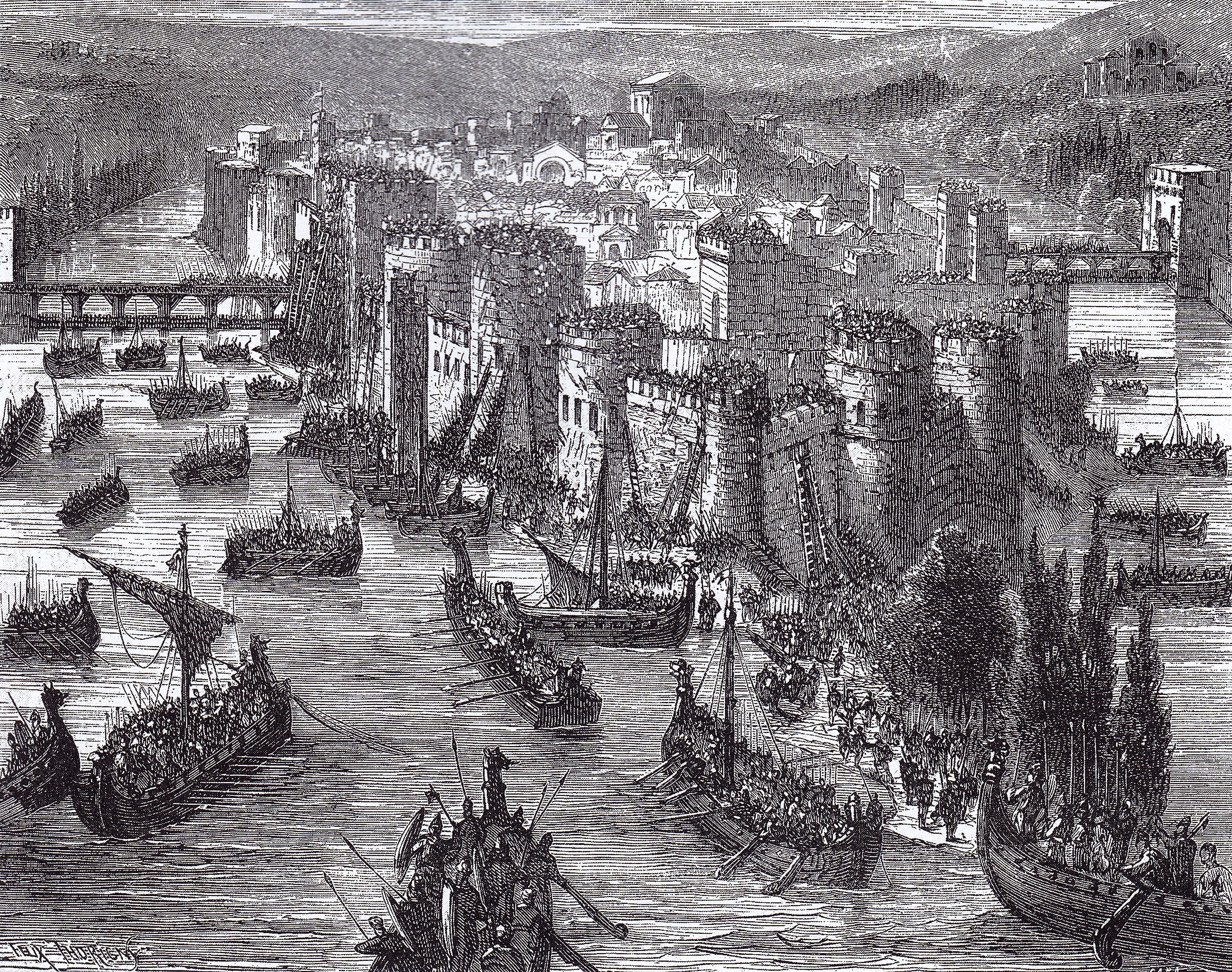
- A Viking siege of Paris, 19th-century portrayal (note: The ramparts here depicted did not exist in 845.)
Date	845, siege began on 28/29 March
Location	Paris, West Francia
Result	Viking victory

Belligerents
Vikings (mainly Danes)	West Francia

Commanders and leaders
Reginherus (possibly Ragnar 'Lodbrok' Sigurdsson)	Charles the Bald

Strength
120 ships, with at least 5,000 men	

The siege of Paris of 845 was the culmination of a Viking invasion of West Francia. The Viking forces were led by a Norse chieftain named "Reginherus", or Ragnar, who has been tentatively identified with the legendary saga character Ragnar Lodbrok. Reginherus's fleet of 120 Viking ships, carrying thousands of warriors, entered the Seine in March and sailed up the river.

King Charles the Bald assembled a smaller army in response, but after the Vikings defeated one division, comprising half of the army, the remaining forces retreated. The Vikings reached Paris at the end of the month, during Easter. They plundered and occupied the city, withdrawing after Charles paid a ransom of 7,000 French livres [2,570 kg (2.53 long tons)] in gold and silver.

== Background ==
The Frankish Empire was first attacked by Viking raiders in 799 (ten years after the earliest-known Viking attack at Portland, Dorset, in England), which led Charlemagne to create a defence system along the northern coast in 810. The defence system repulsed a Viking attack at the mouth of the Seine in 820 (after Charlemagne's death) but failed to hold against renewed attacks of Danish Vikings in Frisia and Dorestad in 834. The attacks in 820 and 834 were unrelated and relatively minor; systematic raiding did not begin until the mid-830s, with the activity alternating between the two sides of the English Channel. Viking raids were often part of struggles among Scandinavian nobility for power and status. Like other nations adjacent to the Franks, the Danes were well informed about the political situation in France; in the 830s and early 840s they took advantage of the Frankish civil wars. Large raids took place in Antwerp and Noirmoutier in 836, in Rouen (on the Seine) in 841 and in Quentovic and Nantes in 842.

== Invasion and siege ==
In March 845 a fleet of 120 Viking ships containing more than 5,000 men entered the Seine under the command of a chieftain named "Reginherus", or Ragnar. Ragnar has been identified with the legendary saga figure Ragnar Lodbrok. Around 841, Reginherus was awarded land in Turholt, Flanders, by Charles the Bald, but he eventually lost the land as well as the favour of the king. Reginherus's Vikings raided Rouen on their way up the Seine in 845, and in response to the invasion, Charles – who was determined not to let the royal Abbey of Saint-Denis (near Paris) be destroyed – assembled an army which he divided into two parts, one for each side of the river. The Vikings attacked and defeated one of the divisions of the smaller Frankish army, took 111 of their men as prisoners and hanged them on an island on the Seine. This was done to honour the Norse god Odin, as well as to incite terror in the remaining Frankish forces.

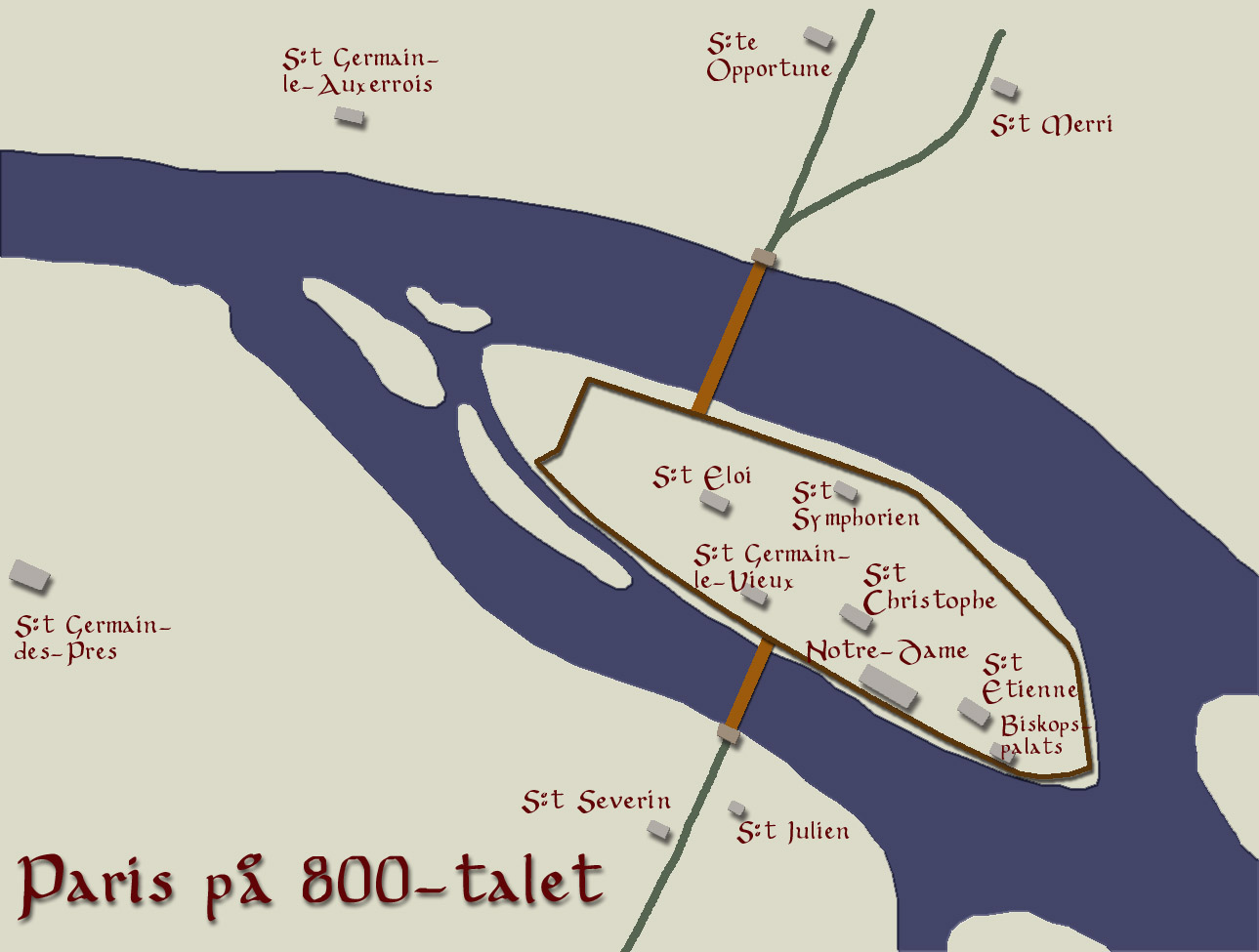
Map of Paris in the 9th century. The city was concentrated on Île de la Cité, an island in the Seine.

The Vikings arrived in Paris on Easter Sunday, 29 March, entered the city and plundered it. During the siege, a plague broke out in their camp. The Norse – who had already been exposed to the Christian religion – first prayed to the Norse gods, then undertook a fast, acting on the advice of one of their Christian prisoners, and the plague subsided. The Franks could not assemble an effective defence, and the Vikings withdrew only after being paid a ransom of 7,000 livres (French pounds) of silver and gold by Charles, amounting to approximately 2,570 kg (2.53 long tons).

Considering the Vikings' earlier loss of land to Charles, the substantial payment may also have been regarded as some form of compensation to the Viking leader and of the invasion itself being an act of revenge. This was the first of a total of 13 payments of so-called danegeld to Viking raiders by the Franks (the term is not expressly known to have been used at this point). While agreeing to withdraw from Paris, the Viking army pillaged several sites along the coast on the return voyage, including the Abbey of Saint Bertin.

Although Charles had been criticised severely for granting the large ransom payment to the Vikings, he had other more critical issues to deal with at the same time, including disputes with his brothers, regional revolts, and disgruntled nobles as well as pressure from abroad. Since he had trouble trusting his own counts to assemble and lead troops to defeat the large Viking force militarily, paying them off instead bought Charles time and possibly peace from further Viking raids – at least in the near future.

The synod of Paris was forced to convene at Meaux because of the siege, but it relocated to Paris after the siege was lifted.

== Aftermath ==
The same year, a Viking fleet sacked Hamburg, which had been elevated to an archbishopric by Pope Gregory IV in 831 on the initiative of Louis the Pious to oversee the Saxon territory and to support the introduction of Christianity to Scandinavia. In response, King Louis the German of East Francia sent a diplomatic mission headed by Count Cobbo (one of two court counts) to the court of Danish King Horik, demanding that he submit to Frankish overlordship and pay reparations for the invasion. Horik eventually agreed to the terms and requested a peace treaty with Louis, while also promising to return the treasure and captives from the raid. Horik most likely wanted to secure the border with Saxony as he faced a conflict with King Olof of Sweden and domestic struggles. By the treaty, Louis demanded Horik's obedience, which was further secured by Horik regularly sending embassies and gifts to Louis and his suspension of support to Viking raiders.

Although many Vikings had died in the plague during the siege of Paris, Ragnar lived to return home to King Horik. According to a story originating from a member of Cobbo's embassy, Ragnar, having attacked the Abbey of Saint-Germain-des-Prés, then in the outskirts of medieval Paris and which Cobbo later visited, attributed the plague to the power of Saint Germain of Paris. While Ragnar showed the gold and silver he had acquired to Horik and boasted about how easy he thought the conquest of Paris had been, he reportedly collapsed crying while relating that the only resistance he had met was from the long deceased saint. As several of Ragnar's men died not long after, the king was so frightened that he ordered the execution of the survivors and the release of his Christian captives. This event, in part, led Horik to receive Archbishop Ansgar, "Apostle of the North", on friendly terms in his own kingdom. Vikings returned again and again in the 860s and secured loot or ransom but, in a turning point for the history of France, the city's walls held against the Vikings' greatest attacking force in the 885-886 siege of Paris.

== Sources ==
- Duckett, Eleanor S (1988). Carolingian Portraits: A Study in the Ninth Century. University of Michigan. ISBN 978-0-472-06157-0.
- Goldberg, Eric Joseph (2006). Struggle for Empire: Kingship and Conflict Under Louis the German, 817–876. Cornell University. ISBN 978-0-8014-3890-5.
- Hoops, Johanne; Beck, Heinrich (2002). Reallexikon der Germanischen Altertumskunde (in German). Vol. 20. Walter de Gruyter. ISBN 978-3-11-017164-8.
- Jones, Gwyn (2001). A History of the Vikings. Oxford University. ISBN 978-0-19-280134-0.
- Kohn, George C (2006). Dictionary of Wars. Infobase. ISBN 978-1-4381-2916-7.
- Mawer, Allen (1922). The Cambridge Medieval History. Vol. III. Cambridge University Press. OCLC 489937746.
- Ogg, FA (1908). A source book of mediæval history: documents illustrative of European life and institutions from the German invasion to the renaissance. American Book Co. OCLC 774441936.
- Sawyer, PH (2001). Illustrated History of the Vikings. Oxford University. ISBN 978-0-19-285434-6.
- Sprague, Martina (2007). Norse warfare: The Unconventional Battle Strategies of the Ancient Vikings. Hippocrene. ISBN 978-0-7818-1176-7.
- Zupko, Ronald Edward (1990). Revolution in Measurement: Western European Weights and Measures Since the Age of Science. Vol. 186. American Philosophical Society. ISBN 978-0-87169-186-6.
