= Monastery of Sant Esteve i Sant Hilari =

Monastery in Cerdanya, Spain

Coordinates: 42°21′47″N 1°55′09″E

The monastery of Sant Esteve i Sant Hilari in the municipality of Alp in the region of Baixa Cerdanya, Catalonia, Spain, was a monastery created during the ninth century. Count Frèdol in 815 is the one who built the cell dedicated to Saint Stephen and Hilari, commonly called St. Stephen of Umfred. Jaume Martí located the ruins of the monastery on the road from Alp to La Molina. The monastery today is rubble with a large slate slab and walls worked with opus spicatum, which is also found in other churches near this area, such as Santa Cecilia de Bolvir, and at the foundation of the apse of Santa Eugènia de Saga and above all that of Sant Esteve de les Pereres in Fontanals de Cerdanya. The monastery was dependent on the monastery of Sant Serni de Tavèrnoles. A tomb from the medieval period has also been found at the site.
