= Remigius of Lyon =

Remigius (died October 28, 875) was archbishop of Lyon.

He worked closely with his predecessor, Archbishop Amulo of Lyons, before his elevation to the episcopate on March 31, 852. He played a prominent part in French ecclesiastical history. He was Archicapellanus from 855 to 863, which was a position of influence.

He figures among the leading members of several synods, and presided over the Synod of Valence in 855. He participated in the predestination controversy which had been precipitated on the church by Gottschalk, whom, like some other leaders, he defended. This brought him up against the still more powerful Hincmar of Reims, who, in the Synod of Chiersy held in 853, got the endorsement of his four chapters on predestination. But these the synod of Valence refused to ratify and, on the contrary, passed six canons against Hincmar's position, and they were reaffirmed by the Synod of Langres in 859, which was proof of Remigius' influence. In the national Synod of Savonières which immediately followed, Remigius presented these canons to Charles the Bald.

When Remigius came into his rule he found that certain sources of revenue which he thought properly belonged to his diocese had been taken from it. He set about regaining this lost revenue, and brilliantly succeeded. For these and other services his grateful people canonized him.

Various writings have been attributed to him, but he does not seem to have been a writer and the attributions are probably false.
