= Sant Serni de Tavèrnoles =

Romanesque Benedictine monastery in Anserall, Catalonia, Spain

Coordinates: 42°22′58″N 1°27′29″E

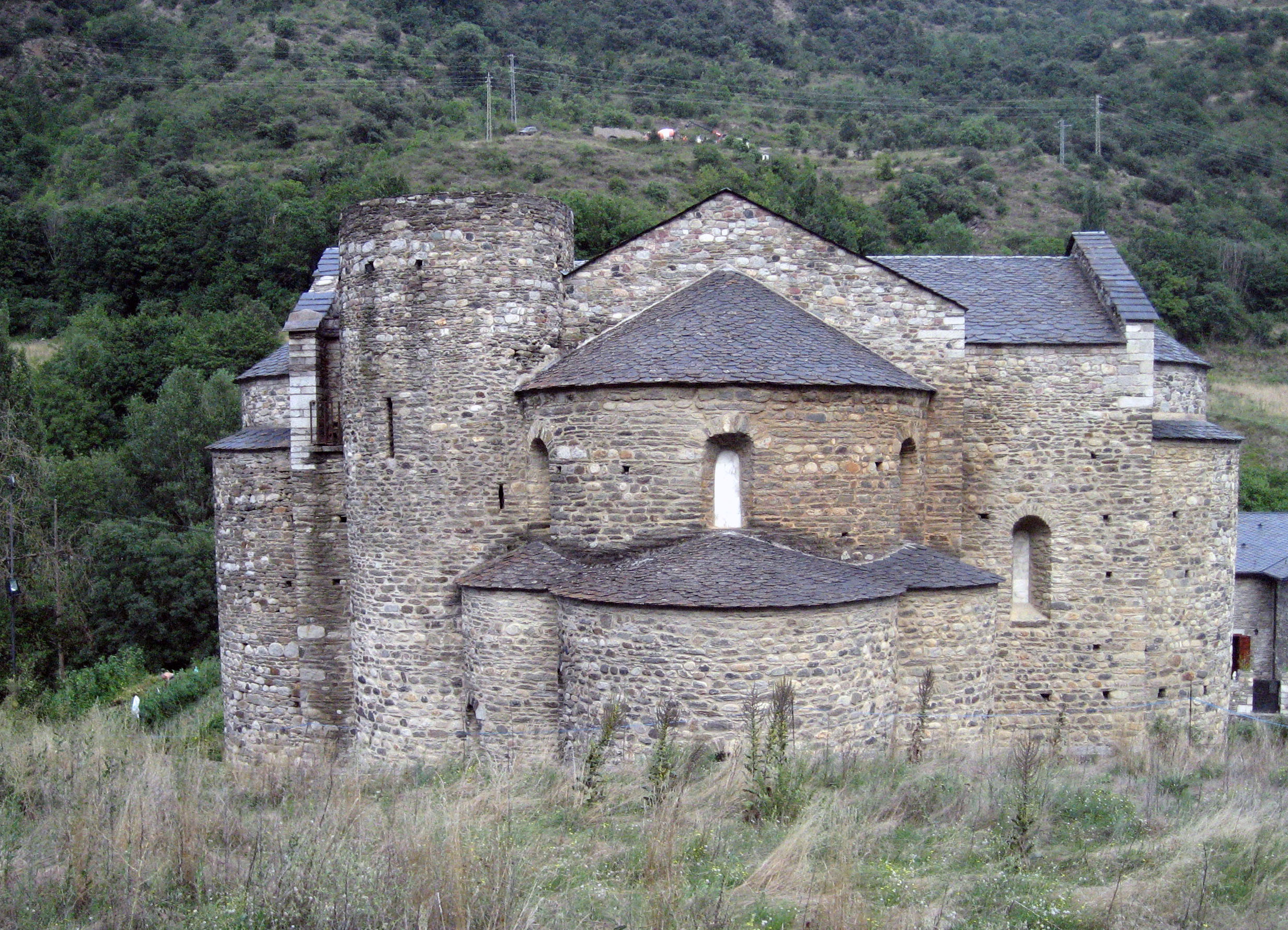
Sant Serni de Tavèrnoles

Sant Serni de Tavèrnoles (or Sant Sadurní de Tavèrnoles) is a Romanesque Benedictine monastery in Anserall, in the municipality of Les Valls de Valira, Alt Urgell, in the Province of Lleida, Catalonia, Spain. It became a Bien de Interés Cultural site on 3 June 1931 and was restored in 1971.

== History ==
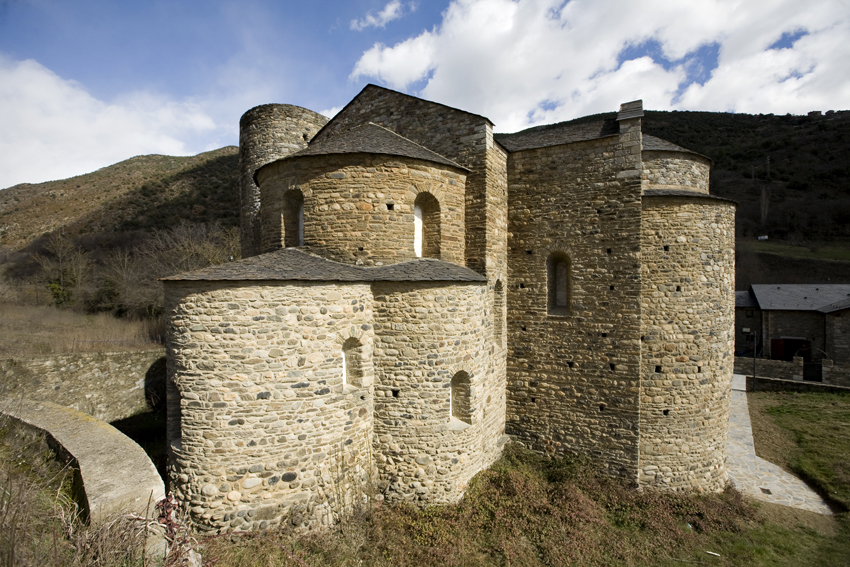
Sant Serni de Tavèrnoles

There is some confusion regarding the origin of the monastery. According to local legend, the relics of St Saturnin arrived at the site during the 6th century leading to the construction of a Visigoth monastery. Between 776 and 799, Leidrad of Lyon, the bishop of La Seu d'Urgell, brought the monastery into the Benedictine Order. The monastery prospered in the 10th and 11th centuries leading to a new building which was consecrated to the Virgin Mary, St Michael and St Saturnin in 1040 by Bishop Eriball of Urgell and Bishop Arnulf of Ribagorça. In the 11th century, the monastery was so rich and powerful that it was able to provide assistance to the Counts of Urgell. During this period the monastery's possessions extended from El Berguedà to Andorra and included the County of Pallars and Cerdanya. Bulls issued by Pope Urban II in 1099 and by Pope Callixtus II in 1119 documented the monastery's privileges and exemptions.

The monastery began to decline in the 14th century, leading to its suppression by Pope Clement VIII in 1592 when it received the modest status of Parish of Anserall. Soon abandoned, it fell into ruin. The capitals from the cloister were later transferred to the Maricel Museum in Sitges from where some were sold to American buyers. The church remained a ruin until 1971 when restoration work was initiated.

== Church ==
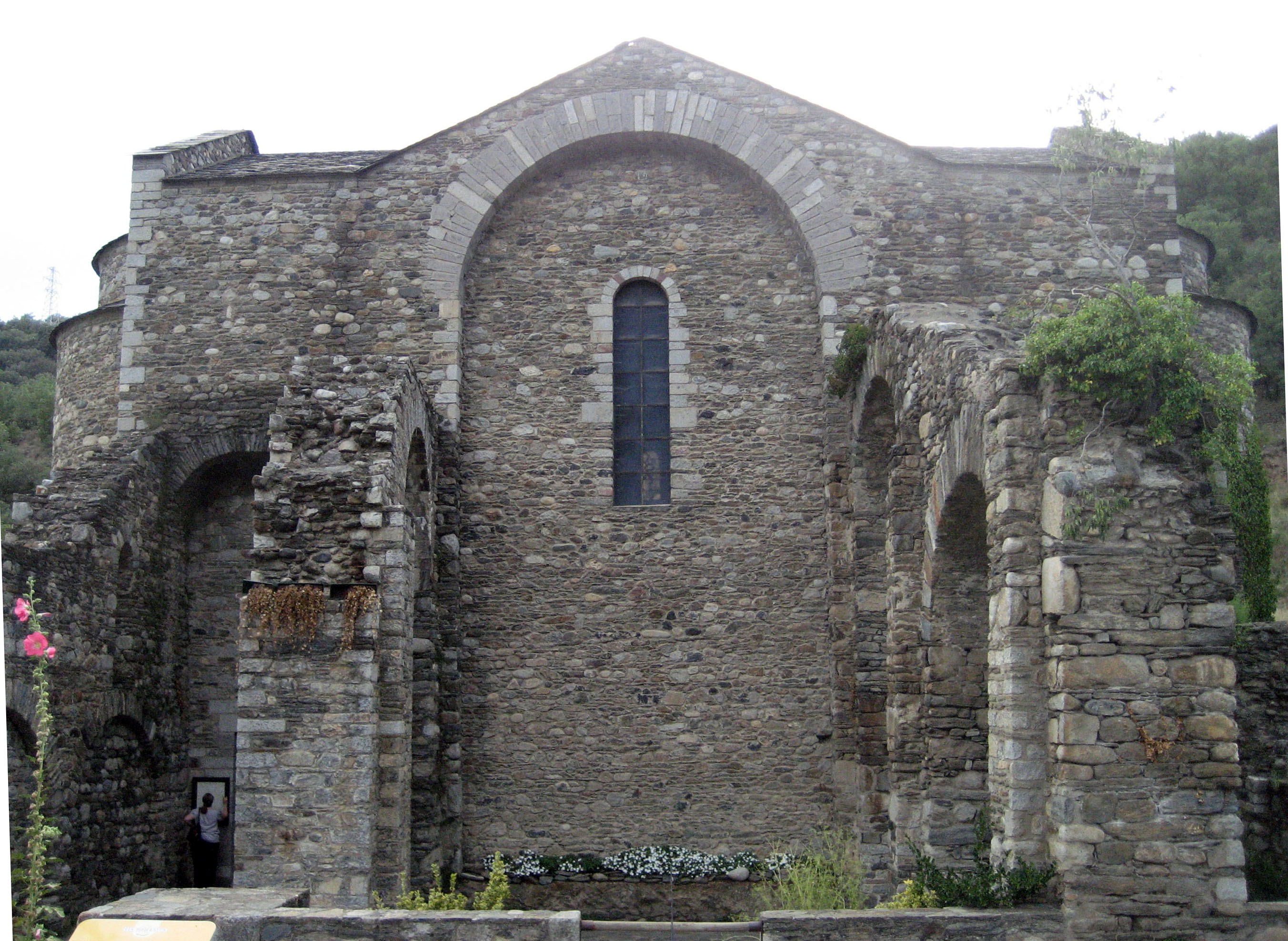
Remains of the nave

The monastery church was constructed as a T-shaped basilica with its nave and adjoining aisles separated by pillars. All that remains of the original building is the western end which unusually has an apse. The only example of its kind in Catalonia, it is in line with the Carolingian tradition. The main apse opens into three smaller apses, symbolizing the Trinity. The remains of the transept can still be seen but there are only a few small vestiges of the nave and the aisles. The nave was covered with barrel vaulting while the lateral aisles had quarter-circular vaults. There are still traces of the base of the primitive steeple but nothing is left of the cloister which was akin to that in the Cathedral of Santa Maria d'Urgell.

The church's baldaquin and 12th century altarpiece depicting bishops with halos are preserved in the Museu Nacional d'Art de Catalunya.
