= Florus of Lyon =

9th-century deacon and ecclesiastical writer

Florus of Lyon (Latin: Florus Lugdunensis), a deacon in Lyon, was an ecclesiastical writer in the first half of the ninth century. A theologian, canonist, liturgist, and poet, he ran the scriptorium at Lyons. He was considered one of the foremost authorities on theological questions among the clergy of the Frankish kingdom. He died about 860.

== Life ==
There is no information regarding the place of birth, the parents, or the youth of this distinguished theologian; but it is probable that he came from the neighbourhood of Lyons. He is mentioned in a letter by the Benedictine monk Walafrid Strabo, indicating that his writings were known beyond Lyons to southern Germany. From the fact that by about 827 he already enjoyed a reputation as a theologian, it may be concluded that he was born certainly before the end of the eighth century.

He was a deacon of the church of Lyons, which office he continued to hold throughout his life. He had some acquaintance with Greek, which was rare in his time, and a little Hebrew. He was head of the cathedral school at Lyon, on which account he is commonly called "Florus Magister".

Florus directed the Lyons scriptorium in which he produced editions of many texts. The transmission of some ancient texts is due to Florus: especially the Latin version (the only complete) of Irenæus' Adversus Hæreses and excerpts from the lost work Contra Fabianum of Fulgentius of Ruspe. As one of the most brilliant spirits of his time, Florus composed impressive compilations of the Church Fathers on defined subjects (Paul's epistles). He was considered one of the foremost authorities on theological questions among the clergy of the Frankish kingdom; and, in consequence, his opinion was often sought in important ecclesiastical matters.

Florus was also much involved in contemporary debates. He was a partisan of Archbishop Agobard of Lyon, who was deposed in 835 for his support of the rebellion against Emperor Louis the Pious, and replaced by Amalarius. In Agobard's defence, Florus wrote a short treatise on how bishops should be appointed; he also attacked Amalarius on theological grounds, accusing him of heretical interpretation of the liturgy. Amalarius was deposed and accused of heresy in 838. When he returned to Lyon, Agobard worked to roll back Amalarius' actions, with the support of Florus.

Florus also used his remarkable knowledge of Augustine to contribute to the Predestination debates of the mid ninth century, in which he defended Gottschalk of Orbais. In the course of these debates, Florus was able to show the inauthenticity of several Pseudo-Augustinian texts.

Almost forgotten for a thousand years, Florus was rediscovered thanks in part to the works of Célestin Charlier in the mid-twentieth century. Subsequent studies are beginning to provide the first critical editions of his works.

== Sources ==
Klaus Zechiel-Eckes, Florus von Lyon als Kirchenpolitiker und Publizist (1999)
