= Synod of Thionville =

The Synod of Thionville was a synod (or council) of ecclesiastic dignitaries of the Carolingian Empire in 835.

Three years after the sons of the emperor rose in rebellion against their father, Louis the Pious, in 830, Ebbo, Archbishop of Rheims, had turned against him. On 13 November 833, Ebbo presided as Louis was deposed and compelled to perform public penance in the Church of St. Mary at Soissons. In return, Ebbo received the Abbey of St. Vaast.

Ebbo continued to support the rebellious Lothaire even after Louis had been solemnly reinstated in March 834. Being prevented by a severe attack of the gout from following Lothaire to Italy he took refuge in the cell of a hermit near Paris, but was found out and sent as prisoner to the Abbey of Fulda. On 2 February 835, Ebbo appeared at the Synod of Thionville, where in the presence of the emperor and forty-three bishops he solemnly declared the monarch innocent of the crimes of which he had accused him at Soissons, and on 28 February 835 made a public recantation from the pulpit of the cathedral of Metz.

The synod also deposed Louis' other staunchest rivals within the church: Agobard, Archbishop of Lyon, Bernard, Bishop of Vienne, and Bartholomew, Archbishop of Narbonne. The synod represented a reversal of that of Soissons of 13 November 833, in which Ebbo had deposed Louis.

== Sources and references ==
(incomplete)
