= Claudius of Turin =

Catholic bishop of Turin

- Bishop of Turin
- Church: Catholic Church
- See: Turin
- In office: 817–827

Personal details
- Born: unknown possible: Spain
- Died: 827 possible: Turin
- Theological work
- Era: Medieval age
- Tradition or movement: Catholicism
- Main interests: Iconoclasm
- Notable ideas: Iconoclasm; Equality of the Apostles; Fallibility of the Church

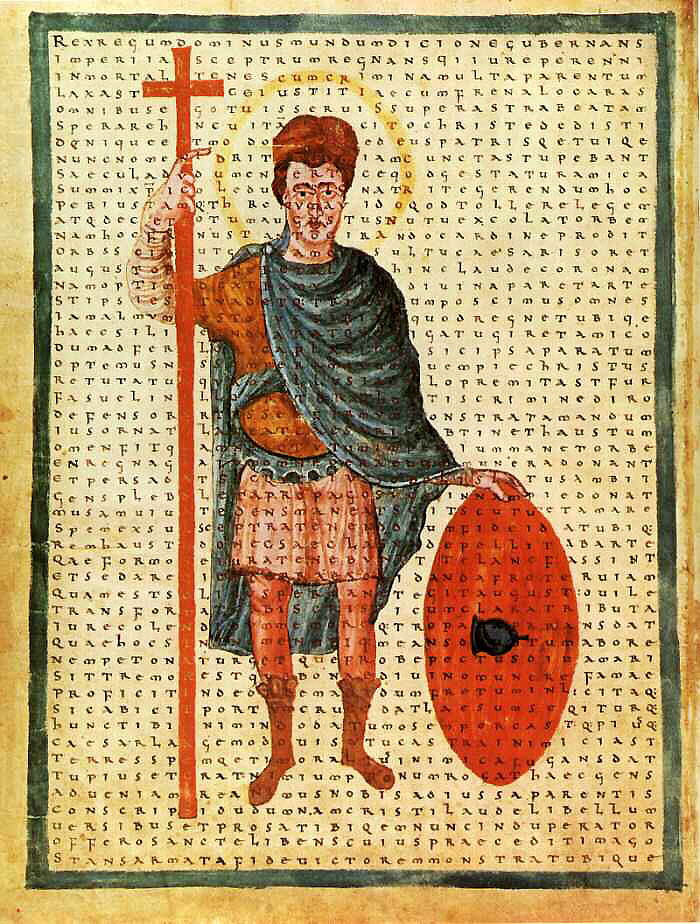
Louis the Pious, Holy Roman Emperor and for a time a chief patron of Claudius.

Claudius of Turin (or Claude) (fl. 810–827) was the Catholic bishop of Turin from 817 until his death. He was a courtier of Louis the Pious and was a writer during the Carolingian Renaissance. He is most noted for teaching iconoclasm, a radical idea at that time in Latin Church, and for some teachings that prefigured those of the Protestant Reformation. He was attacked as a heretic in written works by Saint Dungal and Jonas of Orléans.

== Early career and the imperial court (until 817) ==
Claudius is thought to have been from Spain. This belief may have its origins in the accusations of Jonas of Orléans, who claimed Claudius was a disciple of Felix of Urgel. Felix was a bishop in the foothills of the Spanish Pyrenees whom Claudius may have known personally. The bishop had been condemned by Alcuin at the Council of Frankfurt in 794 for teaching adoptionism. It is now certain that Claudius was not a disciple of Felix. If he was from Spain, it is uncertain whether or not he received his education there or in Lyon under the archbishop Leidrad. It was probably Leidrad and, as Claudius himself tells it, his schoolmates and the future emperor Louis the Pious who convinced Claudius to study exegesis and concentrate on certain portions of Scripture. Claudius also studied the Church Fathers.

When Louis the Pious was still King of Aquitaine, he called Claudius to his court at Chasseneuil sometime before 811. In 813, Emperor Charlemagne called Louis, his only surviving legitimate son, to his court. There he crowned him as his heir. The following year, Charlemagne died and Louis was made ruler of the Holy Roman Empire. He brought Claudius to Aachen, the empire's capital city. There Claudius gave exegetical lectures to the emperor and the court and was even urged to put his lectures in writing by the emperor himself. Claudius was a member of an elite circle of secular and ecclesiastic politicians and authorities and a creatura della corte di Aquisgrana ("creature of the court of Aachen"). In 817, he was sent by Louis to Turin to act as bishop. It has been suggested that the appointment of a theologian and scholar to a post such as Turin, which had attendant military duties due to the threat of Saracen raids, was largely based on the need for an imperial supporter in Italy in light of the rebellion of Bernard. Bernard was the illegitimate son of King Pepin, the third son of Charlemagne. Louis gave Italy to his eldest son Lothair when the empire was partitioned among his three sons in 817. Bernard rebelled against his uncle with the support of Bishop Theodulf of Orléans. The rebellion was put down, but the event reduced the emperor's prestige amongst the Frankish nobility and it became important that the bishop of Turin be a man who was loyal to the emperor.

== Episcopate (817–827) ==
As bishop of Turin, Claudius found that men were often directed to go on pilgrimage to Rome for penance and that worshippers were accustomed to venerate Christ and the saints by bowing before images and relics. Claudius, coming from an educated background, was not greatly exposed to such provincial modes of worship. He made attacks on the use of images, relics, and crosses, he opposed pilgrimages to obtain absolution, and he had little regard for the authority of the pope due to his belief that all bishops were equal.

Claudius was a heretic in the view of Dungal and Jonas of Orléans, who later wrote to refute some of his teachings at the request of the emperor. The last recorded act of Claudius is in a charter of the monastery of St Peter at Novalesa in May 827. He was dead by the time Dungal finished his Responsa contra peruersas Claudii Taurinensis episcopi sententias late in 827, so it can be presumed that he died that year.

== Writings ==
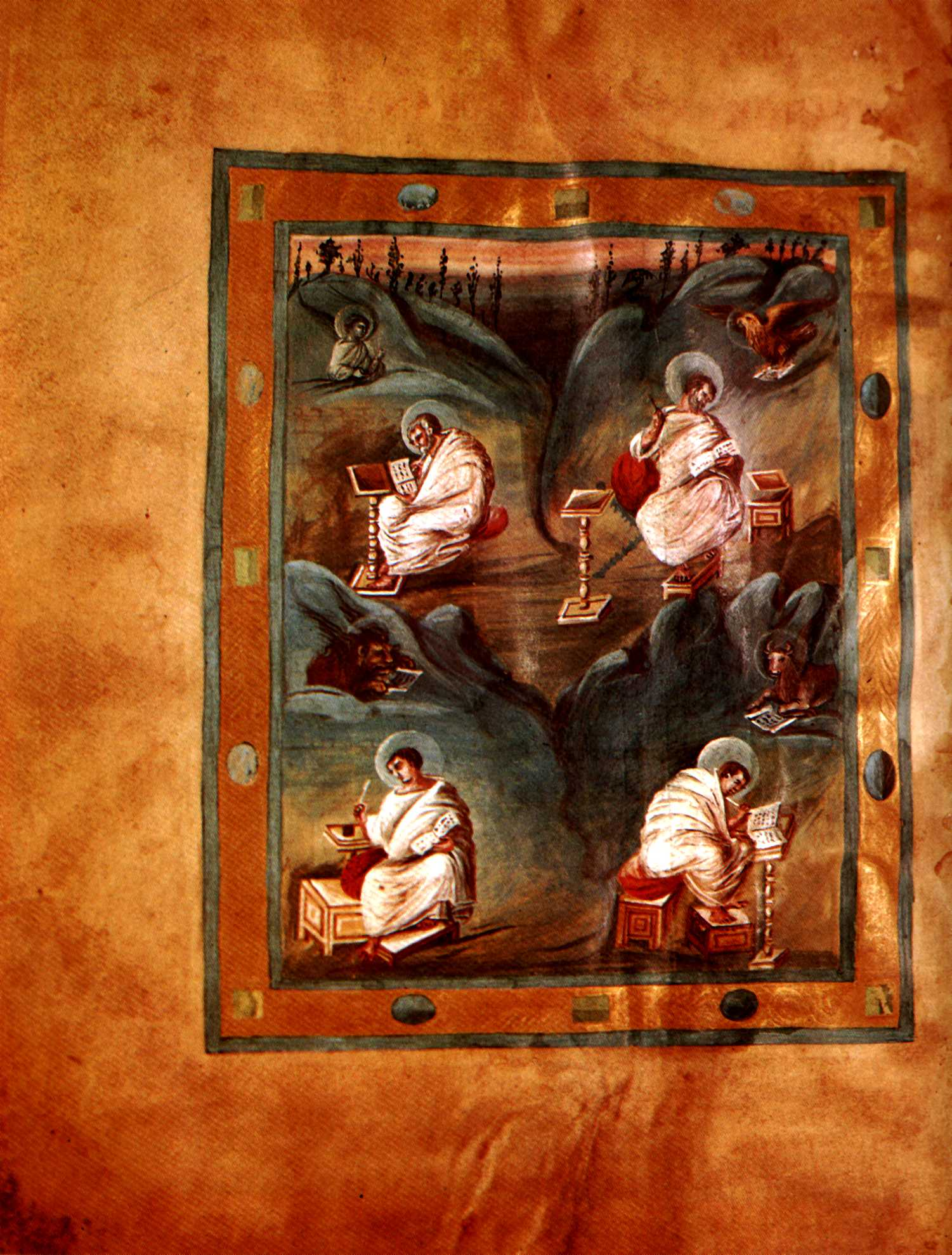
Claudius would have had access to books such as the Aachen Gospels when writing his commentaries.

Claudius was both an author and a copyist. Although most of his extant works are simple biblical commentaries, his writings are very personal. He had a penchant for divulging detail in an age when brevity and anonymity were more common. Around 811, Claudius prepared an exhaustive and encyclopaedic commentary on the Book of Genesis at the request of the emperor. This commentary was edited by Johann Alexander Brassicanus in Vienna before it was first printed in Basel by Hieronymus Froben in 1531. Claudius was influenced by the teachings of Augustine.

Claudius also wrote commentaries on the books of Leviticus, the historical books of the Old Testament, the Gospel of Matthew, and all Pauline epistles, of which the commentary on the Epistle to Galatians shows some of his views prefigure those expressed by both the Waldensians and Protestants centuries later. It was once thought that he had in fact founded the Waldensians, however this was disproved in the 19th century. His epistles on 1 and 2 Corinthians, however, dedicated to Theodemir, abbot of Psalmody, and a possible student of his, were sent to Aachen by the dedicatee to be condemned by the assembled bishops of the realm. The Corinthian commentaries were unpublished, though it was these commentaries that sparked the controversy concerning icons and pilgrimages. Claudius in his writings, maintained that faith is the only requirement for salvation, denies the supremacy of Peter, sees praying for the dead to be useless, attacked practices of the church and held the church to be fallible.

Claudius introduced the "organic metaphor" of the state in his commentary on 1 Corinthians. He proposed that, as the church was the body of Christ, so the state was the body of the emperor. The imperial court would have been familiar with the work because Claudius later wrote that it had been well-received despite the attempts of his former friend, Theodemir of Nismes, to have it condemned as heretical. None of Claudius' works were ever condemned and he tried unsuccessfully to regain Theodemir's approval, but eventually had to pen a well known apology directed against Theodemir's persistent attacks.

Between 814 and 816, Claudius also wrote a Chronicle. It begins with a letter to a priest named Ado. This is followed by a diagram of the genealogy of Jesus going back to Adam, accompanied by commentary. A final section, which was in fact composed first, chronicles the Six Ages of the World based mainly on Bede. Claudius expends much effort in dating the events of the Old Testament according to the Christian calendar.

In 1950, Claudius was identified by P. Bellet as the author of some works previously attributed to Pseudo-Eucherius.

== Iconoclasm ==
Claudius found that Italian churches were full of images and "picture worshippers", though being told that people did not venerate the images themselves, but the saints they represent, Claudius still saw it as a heathenish practice and claimed that Pagans used similar arguments for image veneration. He saw the veneration of saints and claimed images as Pelagian, he argued that people need to only worship the creator and not the creation.

Claudius also opposed the veneration of the cross, Claudius claimed that we need to "bear our own cross (Matt 16:24)" instead of adoring the cross.
