= Council of Meaux–Paris =

Church council (845-846)

The Council of Meaux–Paris was a church council that first met on 17 June 845 in Meaux and finished its work at Paris on 2 February 846. It had intended to meet in Paris from the first, but a Viking siege forced it to convene at Meaux before relocating to Paris when the siege was lifted.

The council issued 83 canons (acts). These included a "program for destroying the Jews" in canons 73–75. The canons of Meaux–Paris were presented to King Charles the Bald at Épernay in June 846, but he refused to enact any of the anti-Jewish proposals, preferring to continue the pro-Jewish policy of his father, Louis the Pious. Archbishop Amulo of Lyon wrote a 'book against the Jews' (Liber contra Judaeos) defending the council's actions and accusing the Jews of numerous abuses.
