= Councils of Quierzy =

Several councils were held at Quierzy, a royal residence under the Carolingians, but now an insignificant village on the Oise in the French Department of Aisne in Picardy. The synod of September 838, ordered the monks of the abbey of Saint-Calais in the Diocese of Le Mans to return to their monastery, from which they falsely claimed to have been expelled by their bishop. It also condemned some of the liturgical opinions of Amalarius of Metz.

The two succeeding councils, held respectively in 849 and 853, dealt with Gottschalk and his peculiar teaching respecting predestination. The first of these meetings sentenced the recalcitrant monk to corporal castigation, deposition from the priestly office and imprisonment; his books were to be burned. At the second synod (853) the famous four decrees or chapters (capitula) drawn up by Hincmar on the predestination question were published. They asserted:

- the predestination of some to salvation, and, in consequence of Divine foreknowledge, the doom of others to everlasting punishment;
- the remedy for the evil tendencies of free will through grace;
- the Divine intention of saving all men;
- the fact of universal redemption.

The council held in February 857 aimed at suppressing the disorders then so prevalent in the kingdom of Charles the Bald. The synod in 858 was attended by the bishops who remained loyal to Charles the Bald during the invasion of his dominions by Louis the German. It addressed a firm but conciliatory letter to the invader stating its attitude towards him for the intentions which he expressed, but which his actions belied. Incidentally, it provides a terminus ante quem for the forgeries known as the False Decretals, which were quoted on the question of immunity for Church property.
