= Angelomus of Luxeuil =

Angelomus (died c.895) was a monk and biblical commentator from the Abbey of Luxeuil. He was influenced by Alcuin. He also used Pseudo-Jerome.

== Works ==
- Commentarius in Genesin (online)
- Enarrationes In Libros Regum (online, 1565 edition online)
- Enarrationes In Cantica Canticorum (online)
