= Tusey =

Hamlet in the Meuse department of France

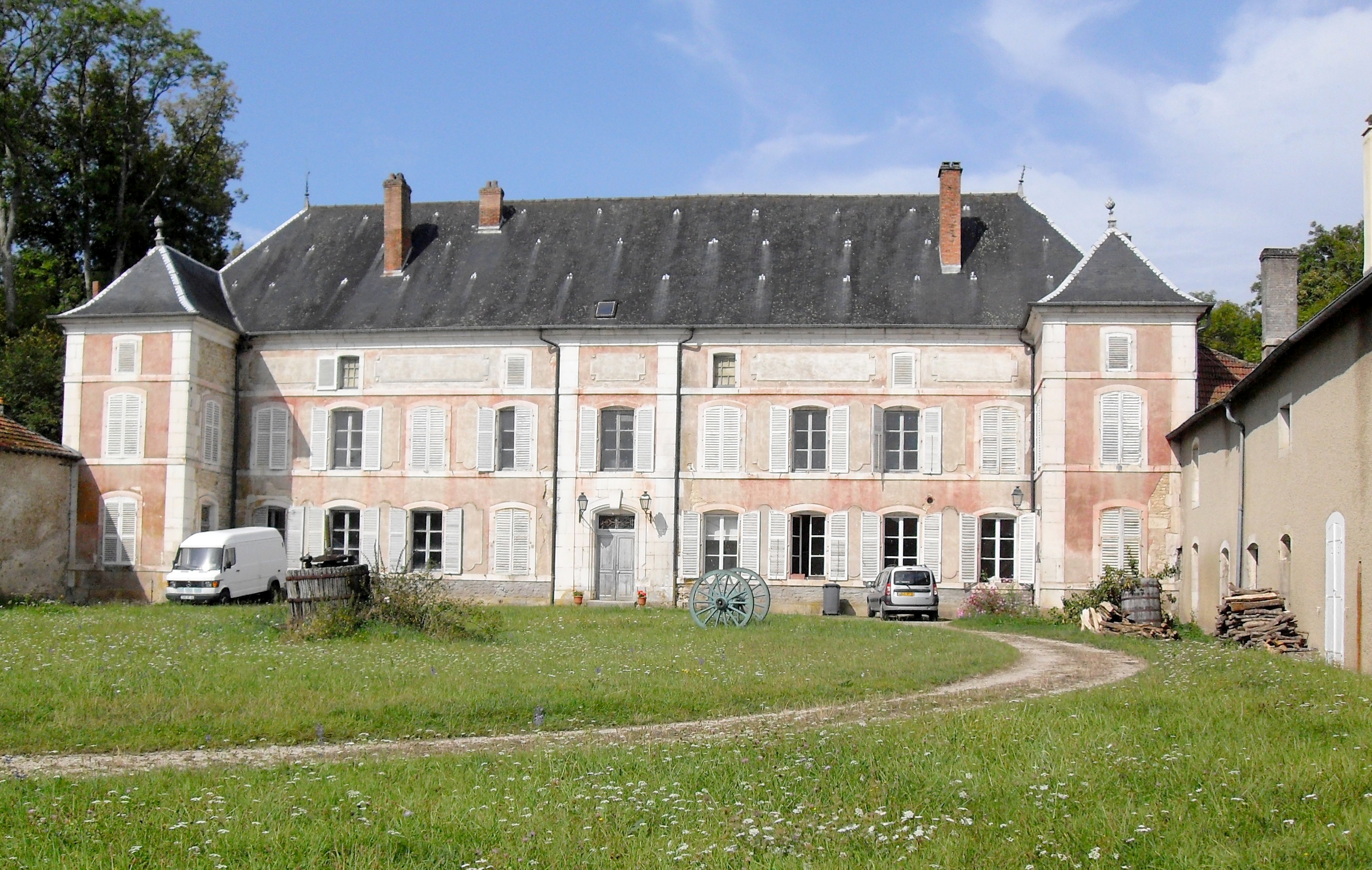
The château of the foundry

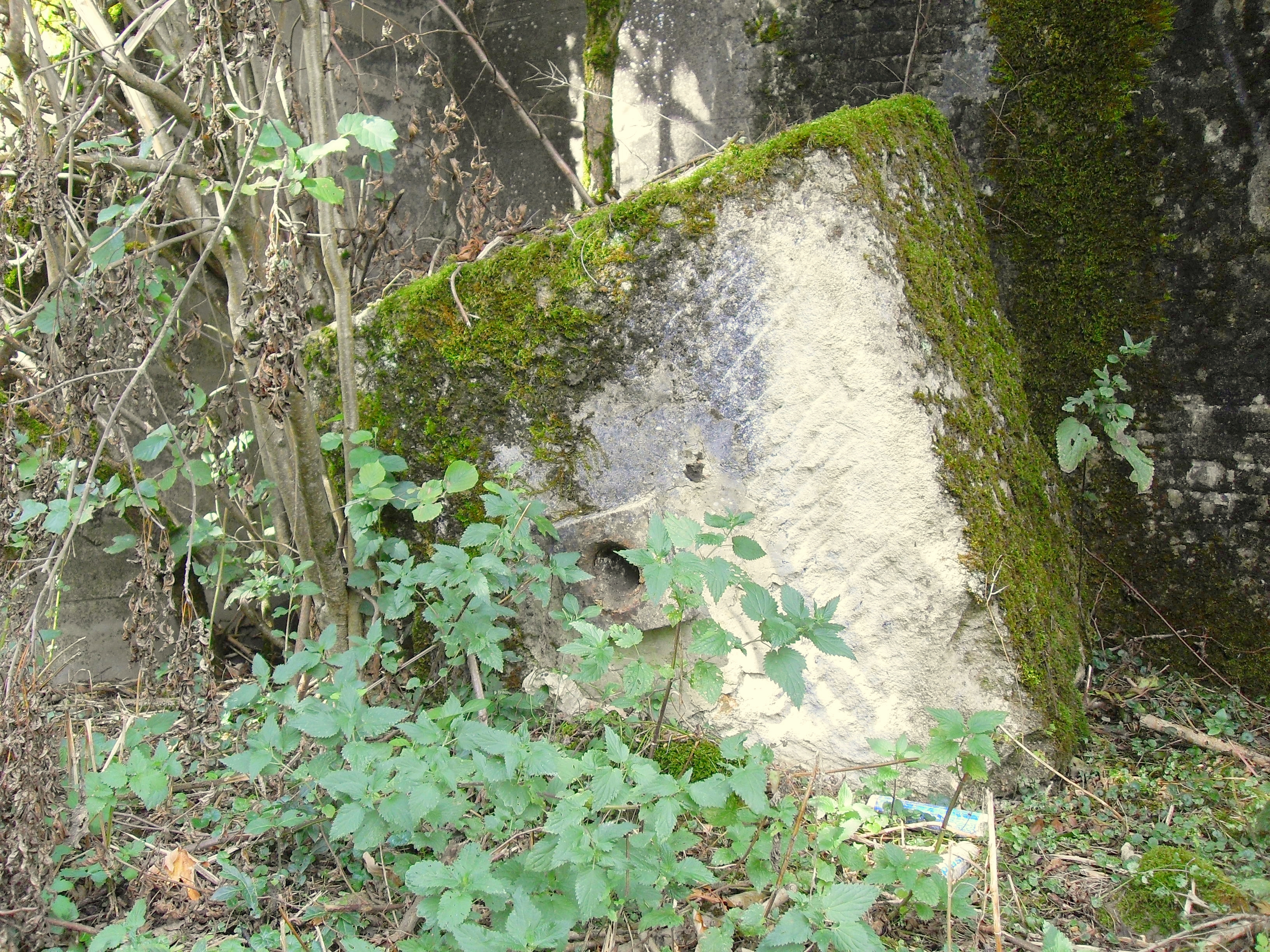
The borne d'Empire as it appears today

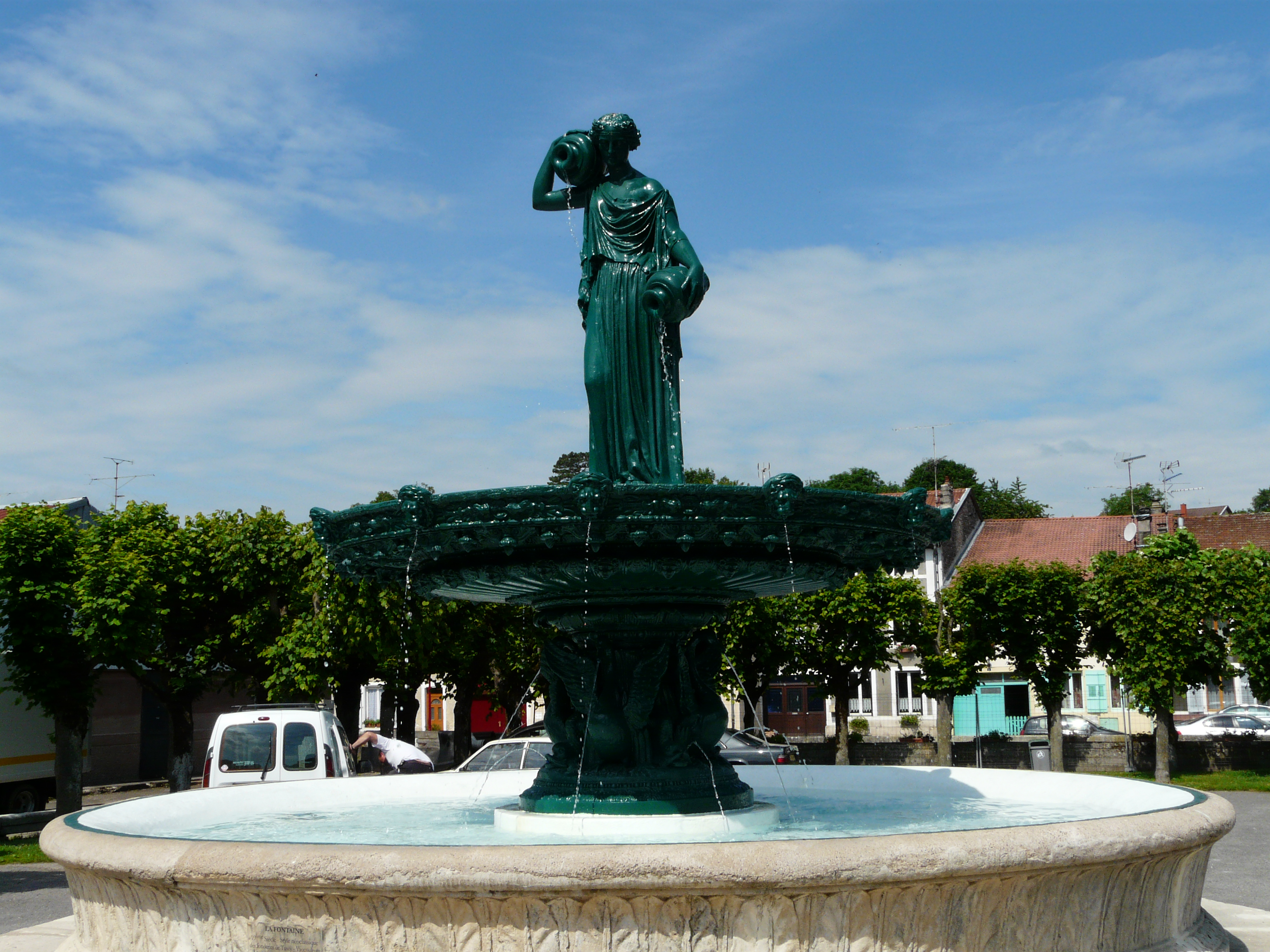
Tusey-produced fountain at Void-Vacon

Tusey (French pronunciation: [tyzɛ]; also spelled Tuzey or Touzy) is today a hamlet of Vaucouleurs on the Meuse. It is first mentioned in documents of 859–65 as Tusey-sur-Meuse (Tusiacum super Mosam or Mosellam). From 22 October to 7 November 860 a church council was held there under King Charles the Bald. There was a royal palace at nearby Vaucouleurs. The importance of Tusey declined during the Middle Ages.

A large cut stone, about one metre square, known locally as the borne d'Empire, "bollard of the Empire", is probably a boundary marker placed at the site of the 1299 meeting in a then forested area (since named Quatre-Vaux) between Philip IV of France and Albert I of Germany – the so-called meeting of the Emperor and the King. The boundary markers that came out of this meeting were topped by bronze pieces, removed during the reign of Henry II. The hole for the bronze attachment is still visible on the stone.

In 1832, Pierre Adolphe Muel established a foundry at Tusey. In 1840 he brought in a partner and renamed the company Muel et Wahl. In 1862 Zégut took over and in 1874 Louis Gasne. From 1896 until 1904 it was in owned by Dufilhol et Chapal, and passed on Dufilhol's death to Laurent Chevailler. Pierre Esch took over in 1935 and the foundry was finally shuttered in 1963.

== Sources ==
- Beck, Henry G. J. (1959). "The Selection of Bishops Suffragan to Hincmar of Rheims, 845–882". The Catholic Historical Review. 45 (3): 273–308. JSTOR 25016580.
- McKeon, Peter R. (1974). "The Carolingian Councils of Savonnières (859) and Tusey (860) and their Background: A Study in the Ecclesiastical and Political History of the Ninth Century". Revue Bénédictine. 84 (2): 75–110. doi:10.1484/J.RB.4.00784.
