= Leidrad =

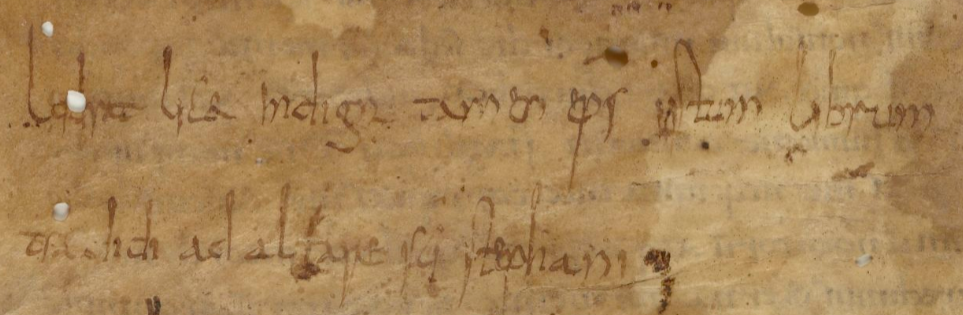
Autograph of Leidrad from a copy of Jerome's commentary on Isaiah that he donated to the church of Saint Stephen

Leidrad (or Leidrat, as he spelled it) was the bishop of Lyon from 797 and its first archbishop from 804 until 814. He was a courtier of Charlemagne before he was a bishop. As bishop, he helped resolve the adoptionist controversy. He also began a programme of building and renovation in his diocese, turning Lyon into a centre of learning. Of his writings, two letters and a treatise on baptism survive.

Leidrad was a native of Noricum (that is, the Duchy of Bavaria). He received his primary education at Freising Cathedral, where one of his colleague was Arn, future bishop of Salzburg. He became a deacon of Freising under Bishop Aribo (764–783). He joined Charlemagne's court shortly after 782. It has sometimes been asserted that he was Charlemagne's librarian. At court, he befriended Alcuin of York, who speaks highly of him in his letters. After an illness, Leidrad convalesced for a year at church of Saint Martin at Tours, where Alcuin was abbot.

Leidrad was appointed to the diocese of Lyon by Charlemagne in 797. In a letter he wrote to the emperor years later, between 809 and 812, he recalled how he had been appointed "to remedy the sins of carelessness in the past" that had left the church of Lyon "destitute ... with regard to its buildings as well as its liturgical offices".

In 798, he completed a circuit as missus dominicus (royal envoy) in the Rhône valley and Septimania. Accompanied by Theodulf of Orléans, he visited Avignon, Nîmes, Maguelonne, Agde, Béziers, Narbonne and Carcassonne. Theodulf describes the court they held at Narbonne in his treatise Ad iudices ("To Judges").

Leidrad did not finally take up his episcopal duties until 799. Two letters of Alcuin refer to him as bishop elect before this. In 799, he was appointed along with Archbishop Nebridius of Narbonne and Abbot Benedict of Aniane to investigate the charge against Bishop Felix of Urgell that he was an adoptionist. The commission went to Urgell, where they convinced Felix to attend a synod at Aachen. Alcuin defeated Felix in a debate before the synod and the latter recanted. He was, however, deposed from his bishopric and consigned to the custody of Leidrad in Lyon for life. He is mentioned in a letter Felix wrote that year. Alcuin in a letter asks Leidrad to send him a copy of Felix's treatise Against the Saracen if indeed he has a copy. In 804, Lyon was raised to an archbishopric.

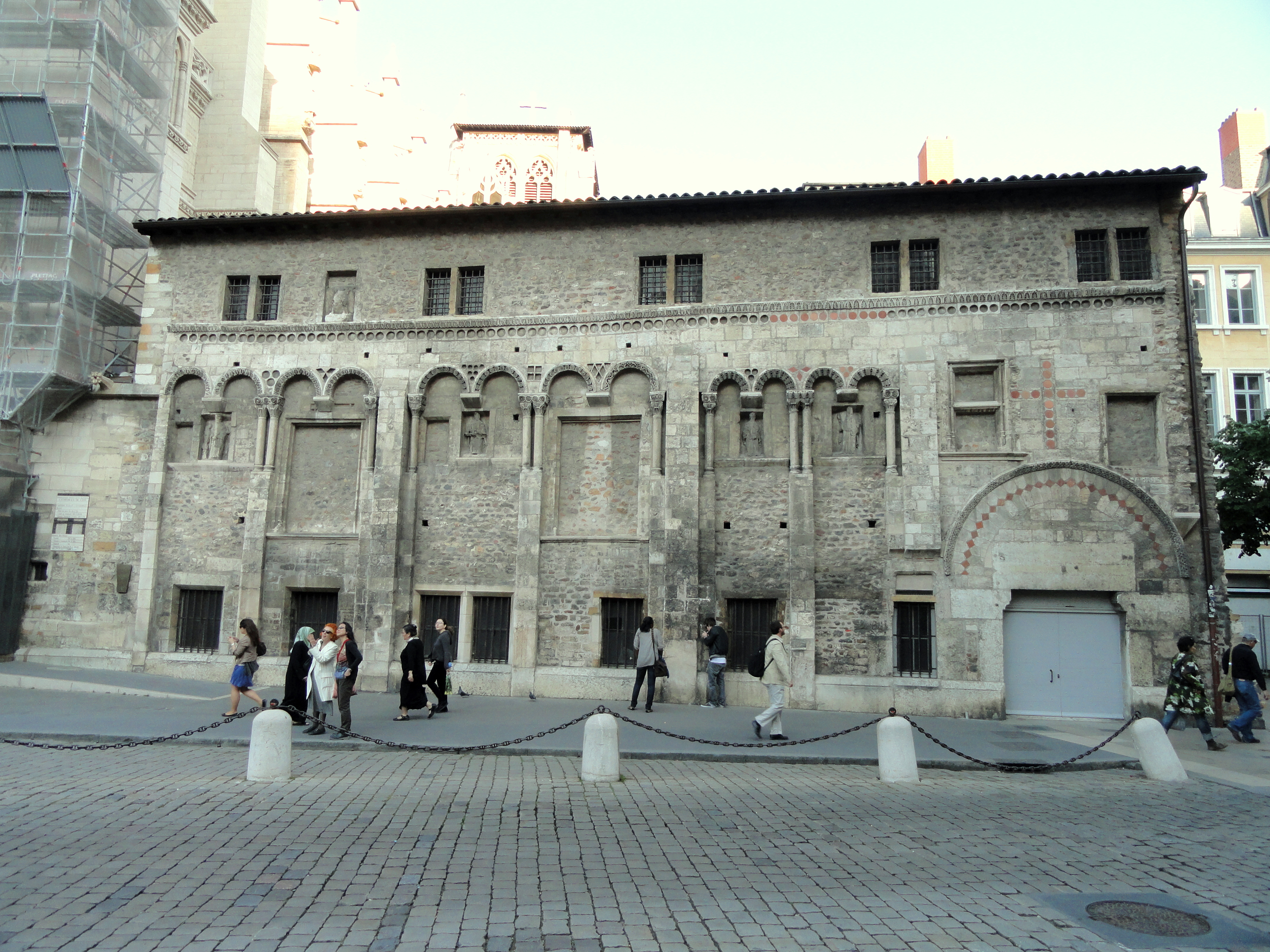
The Vielle Manécanterie in Lyon today

Under Leidrad, Lyon emerged as a centre of learning in the Carolingian Empire. He paid special attention to the education of his clergy, the regulation of the liturgy and the building up of his library. At least five manuscripts bear his ex voto, having been donated by him to the church: Rufinus of Aquileia's translation of Gregory of Nazianzus; Augustine of Hippo's Opuscula; Augustine's Contra Faustum; a miscellany of logic and creeds; and Jerome's commentary on Isaiah. According to his aforementioned report to Charlemagne, he established a schools of cantors and lectors, ensuring that the latter were capable of biblical exegesis. For his reformed chant, he instituted "the usage of the sacred palace", i.e., Charlemagne's palace chapel at Aachen. He also looked to Chrodegang of Metz for guidance. His reform of the liturgy appears to have been limited to the chant and the readings at Mass.

Leidrad renovated churches, including Lyon Cathedral, and restored farm buildings. He built a cloister for his cantors on the pattern of Metz. This cloister is probably the building today known as the Vielle Manécanterie. He re-founded many monasteries and expanded a house near the episcopal palace so that if Charlemagne ever visited there would be lodgings for him.

In 811, Leidrad was one of the witnesses to Charlemagne's will. In 814, Charlemagne's successor, Louis the Pious, ordered him to resolve a dispute at Mâcon. Later that year he resigned his bishopric and went into retirement at the Abbey of Saint-Médard de Soissons. His choice of successor, Agobard, his chorbishop for several years, was confirmed immediately by election, but not by Emperor Louis for another two years. Leidrad died in 816. Alcuin praised his integrity and benevolence, while Ado of Vienne praised his usefulness to the state.

Besides his letter to Charlemagne, a letter Leidrad wrote to his sister on the death of her son also survives. At Charlemagne's request in 812, he also composed a theological treatise, Liber de sacramento baptismi ("Book on the Sacrament of Baptism"). The text presents "a skein of Biblical references" woven together. In one 10th-century manuscript from Girona, the text is erroneously attributed to Jerome.

== Sources ==
- Bennett, S. A. (1882). "Leidradus". In William Smith; Henry Wace (eds.). A Dictionary of Christian Biography, Literature, Sects and Doctrines. Vol. 3. Murray. pp. 644–645.
- Cavadini, John C. (1993). The Last Christology of the West: Adoptionism in Spain and Gaul, 785–820. University of Pennsylvania Press.
- Cramer, Peter (1993). Baptism and Change in the Early Middle Ages, c.200–c.1150. Cambridge University Press.
- de Jong, Mayke (2005). "Charlemagne's Church". In Joanna Story (ed.). Charlemagne: Empire and Society. Manchester University Press. pp. 103–135.
- McKitterick, Rosamond (1983). The Frankish Kingdoms under the Carolingians, 751–987. London: Longman.
- McKitterick, Rosamond (1994). "Women and Literacy in the Early Middle Ages". Books, Scribes and Learning in the Frankish Kingdoms, 6th–9th Centuries. Cambridge University Press. pp. 1–43.
- Tafel, Sigmund (1923). "The Lyons Scriptorium". In W. M. Lindsay (ed.). Palaeographia Latina. Vol. Part II. Oxford University Press. pp. 66–73.
- Tafel, Sigmund (1925). "The Lyons Scriptorium". In W. M. Lindsay (ed.). Palaeographia Latina. Vol. Part IV. Oxford University Press. pp. 40–70.
- Tischler, Matthias M. (2019). "Using the Carolingian Past in a Society of Transformation: The Case of Early Medieval Septimania/Catalonia in the Long Tenth Century (900–1050)" (PDF). Medieval Worlds. 10: 72–86. doi:10.1553/medievalworlds_no10_2019s72.
- van Renswoude, Irene (2019). The Rhetoric of Free Speech in Late Antiquity and the Early Middle Ages. Cambridge University Press.
- Vialettes, Madeleine (1995). "Le bâtiment de la "Vieille Manécanterie" de la cathédrale Saint-Jean de Lyon". Bulletin Monumental. 153 (1): 47–63. doi:10.3406/bulmo.1995.3531.
