= Maurdramnus =

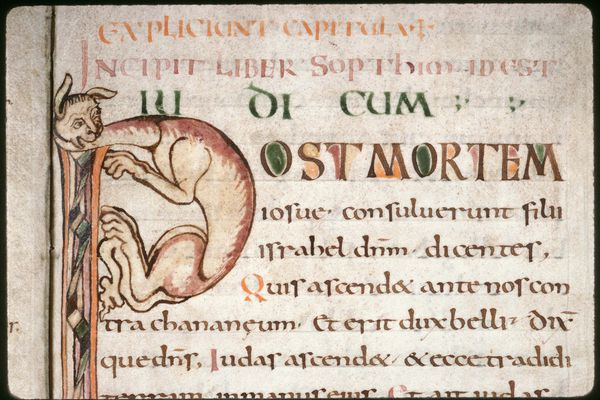
Start of the Maccabees in the Maurdramnus Bible, copied by Maurdramnus himself

Maurdramnus was the abbot of Corbie from 771 until 781. He was a key figure in the development of the script known as Caroline minuscule.

Maurdramnus became abbot after Hado, who received confirmation of Corbie's privileges and immunities from Charlemagne on 16 March 769. According to one list of abbots, Hado died on 28 December 770. No charter mentions Maurdramnus, but a calendar commemorates the anniversary of his death on 20 May. He donated property at Thennes to the abbey, indicating that he came from a local family.

During Maurdramnus' abbacy, Charlemagne's cousin Adalard entered Corbie, probably in 772. At the king's request, Adalard became the gardener. Maurdramnus also received a donation of lands in Alsace and the Wormsgau from Queen Gerberga although whether before or after the death of King Carloman in 771 is unclear. Coupled with the lack of grants to the abbey from Charlemagne, Gerberga's donation may indicate that Maurdramnus supported Carloman and his heirs over Charlemagne.

The Maurdramnus script is named for Maurdramnus. It is the earliest datable example of Caroline minuscule, having been created at Corbie in the 770s. Over sixty manuscripts are known in this script. Maurdramnus himself copied the Book of Maccabees in the manuscript Amiens 11, known as the Maurdramnus Bible. Although begun under Maurdramnus, this bible was not finished at his death.

According to Paschasius Radbertus, Maurdramnus was succeeded as abbot by Adalard while still living. This took place in 781. He may have continued to exercise the office of abbot during Adalard's absences. At his death he was wealthy. His property was divided between the monks, the needy (poor, sick, widows, orphans) and a fund for the abbey church building.

== Bibliography ==
- Boodts, Shari (2023). "The Bible in the Carolingian Age". In H. A. G. Houghton (ed.). The Oxford Handbook of the Latin Bible. pp. 169–186.
- Cabaniss, Allen, ed. (1967). Charlemagne's Cousins: Contemporary Lives of Adalard and Wala. Syracuse University Press.
- Ganz, David (1990). Corbie in the Carolingian Renaissance. Jan Thorbeck.
