= Bernard, son of Charles Martel =

Abbot of St. Quentin

Bernard or Bernhard de Saint Quentin (d'Herstal), Abby of von St. Quentin, Abbot of St. Quentin (c.720-787) was a son of Charles Martel by his mistress Ruodhaid.

== Life ==
Bernard was a half-brother of the Frankish King Pepin the Short, and uncle to Charlemagne. He was brother to Hieronymus and Remigius of Rouen. Although they were all denied any claim in the legacy of their father, they were raised at court and accorded various honors. Medievalist Donald C. Jackman suggests that Bernhard's and Charlemagne's mothers may have been closely related.

In 760, he and his two brothers (Hieronymus and Remigius) went to Italy on behalf of their half-brother Pepin to mediate between Pope Paul I and Desiderius. They convinced Desiderius to return some of the cities he captured back to the papacy, but the Lombard king did not follow through on his promises.

In 773 Bernhard led half of the Frankish army in his nephew Charlemagne's Lombard campaign. While Charlemagne led his contingent through the pass of Moncenisio, Bernard led his through the Great St. Bernard Pass. He then participated in the Siege of Pavia. Bernard was prominent in the reign of Charlemagne's son Louis the Pious.

== Family ==
According to Paschasius Radbertus, Bernard married first a Frankish woman who bore him:

- Adalard, abbot of Corbie Abbey.

He later married Gundlindis, daughter of Adalbert, Duke of the Alemanni. They had two sons and two daughters.

- Wala (d. 835), a high-ranking court dignitary, later abbot of Corbie
- Bernhard, a monk of Corbie
- Gundrada, sent to the Abbey of Ste-Croix in Poitiers
- Theodrada, abbess of Notre-Dame de Soissons

Louis the Pious grew concerned regarding the power and influence bestowed on his cousins by his father, and shortly after being crowned Adalard was exiled to St. Philibert on Noirmoutier, (but later reinstated at court); Count Wala was forced to separate from his wife and take his brother's place at Corbie (also later reinstated); Bernhard was exiled to Lérins; and Gundrada was sent from court. Only Theodrada, the widow of Theodoric, Duke of the Riparuarii was left undisturbed.

Sabine Baring-Gould says Bernard was the grandfather of saint Ida of Herzfeld through his daughter Theodrada.
