= Placitum =

Public Judicial Assemblies in the Middle Ages

In the early Middle Ages, a placitum (Latin for "plea") was a public judicial assembly. Placita origins can be traced to military gatherings in the Frankish kingdoms in the seventh century. After the Frankish conquest of Italy in 774, placita were introduced before the end of the eighth century. Also known as "Marchfields" or "Mayfields" (based on the month of the gathering), early meetings were used as planning sessions for military expeditions.

Originally, the term most commonly referred to the placitum generalis, or conventus, a plenary assembly of the entire kingdom, whereat military and legislative matters, such as the promulgation of capitularies, predominated over judicial functions. The nature of these assemblies is described by the ninth-century prelate Hincmar in his De ordini palatii. Later, the term placitum came primarily to prefer to the public court presided over by the centenarius or to the higher court of the count (otherwise called a mallus). The frequency at which placita were held was governed by capitularies. All free men were required to attend and those who did not were fined. Eventually, because the counts, their deputies (the viscounts) and the centenars abused their power to summon in order to profit from the fines, men were required to attend no more than three placita a year. The presiding magistrate usually brought with him judges, notaries and scabini to address questions of law.

The public placitum declined in the tenth and eleventh centuries as the process of "feudalization" turned formerly public offices into seignorial jurisdictions. Nonetheless, the language and procedures of the placita survived down to the end of the Middle Ages, while the tradition of the placita generalia was continued in the estates general and the estates provincial.
