= Gottschalk of Orbais =

9th century theologian

Gottschalk of Orbais (Latin: Godescalc, Gotteschalchus; c. 808 – 30 October 868) was a Saxon theologian, monk and poet. Gottschalk was an early advocate for the doctrine of double predestination, an issue that ripped through both Italy and Francia from 848 into the 850s and 860s. Led by his own interpretation of Augustine's teachings on the matter, he claimed the sinfulness of human nature and the need to turn to God with a humility for salvation. He saw himself as a divine vessel calling all of Christianity to repent for decades of Civil War. His attempts of this new Christianisation of Francia ultimately failed, his doctrine was condemned as heresy at the 848 council of Mainz and 849 council of Quierzy. Following his conviction as a heretic Gottschalk remained stubborn to his ideology disobeying the ecclesiastical hierarchy, making him an "actual heretic in the flesh", for this disobedience Gottschalk was placed in monastic confinement; however the shockwaves his ideology sent around Western Christendom refused to stop reverberating, Gottschalk managed to win over more followers and the threat remained up until his death in 868.

== Early life ==
Gottschalk was a son of Saxon count Bernus, child oblate at the monastery of Fulda under the tutelage of the Abbot Hrabanus Maurus of Mainz. Then, he was sent at Reichenau, he became close friends with Walafrid Strabo and Loup de Ferrières. In June 829, at the synod of Mainz, on the pretext that he had been unduly constrained by his abbot, he sought and obtained his liberty, withdrew first to Corbie.

== Priesthood ==
Between 835 and 840 Gottschalk was ordained priest, without the knowledge of his bishop, by Rigbold, chorepiscopus of Reims. Gottschalk's time at the Monastery of Corbie would have been formative in his development in both intellect and missionary ideology, Corbie being the centre for preparing missionaries. Before 840 Gottschalk deserted his monastery and went to Italy, where he preached his doctrine of twin predestination, and entered into relations with Notting, bishop of Verona, and Eberhard, margrave of Friuli.

He was however driven from Italy through the influence of Hrabanus Maurus, now archbishop of Mainz, who wrote two violent letters to Notting and Eberhard. Gottschalk travelled through Dalmatia, Pannonia and Noricum, while continuing to preach and write.

Gottschalk was at Trpimir I of Croatia's court between 846 and 848, and his work De Trina deitate is an important source of information for Trpimir's reign. Gottschalk was a witness to the battle between Trpimir and Byzantine strategos, probably of Dalmatia, when Trpimir was victorious.

== Predestination controversy ==
Gottschalk returned to Francia after a decade of travels throughout Europe, during this time he had gained reputation for his teachings on predestination. The key foundations of this belief are that God had granted grace to a select few while denying it to those destined for Hell. This was a direct split from theological belief that God viewed humans acts with final judgement being based upon a person's nature and willingness to repent for sins, with God being able to deduce sinners and unrepentant. Gottschalk strengthened his ideas throughout the 830s and 840s a period in which the Carolingian Empire was falling continuously into crisis. In this time of uncertainty Gottschalk's teachings were a clear wish for atonement; this message grew from the culture of the 820s–830s that saw Louis the Pious perform public penance, also inspired by Augustine. This state of repentance had to be permanent, the daily prayer for sin and confession of sins that was accepted within [monastic] life had clearly not worked, so a constant state of repentance was needed to keep from enticing God's wrath.

Gottschalk's teachings went unopposed until the 848 synod of Mainz, here his old abbot Hrabanus presided over events now as Archbishop of Mainz, also present was King Louis the German. Gottschalk's libellus to support his theological belief was condemned as heretical. Gottschalk was beaten by those present, before taking an oath never to return to Louis the Germans Kingdom of East Francia. Gottschalk was a priest and monk from the archdiocese of Rheims, so was sent to the Archbishop Hincmar of Rheims for containment. This exposed the diocese of Rheims to the extreme theological issues that Gottschalk brought with him.

Ninth century heresies had largely been foreigners (Spanish or Greek), creating a great other for Carolingian theologians to use to define faith boundaries, the one exception was Gottschalk who continuously refused to renounce his beliefs.

From Gottschalk's position of confinement he gained help from the monks at Orbais, where he had been previously contained. From this position Gottschalk sent his doctrine to all forms of ecclesiastical and lay authority. Gottschalk expected this to find support, he did in the scholar Ratramnus who composed ideas on predestination similar to those of Gottschalk.

== Theology ==
Gottschalk was influenced by the Augustinian soteriology, which centered on a divine monergism, and implied a double predestination. However, unlike Augustine, whose argument for reprobation was consequent to his doctrine of federal headship and original sin, Gottschalk argued for double predestination based on the immutable sovereignty of God. He maintained that predestination was absolute, with God's will determining the fate of both the saved and the damned. His teachings attracted significant attention and controversy, ultimately leading to his condemnation as a heretic.

Peter Sammons notes "Gottschalk did not believe in an arbitrary damnation for the reprobate; it was always based on the justice of God and the evil works or merit of the wicked. He rightly clarifies a common misunderstanding: that God’s predestination of the judgment of the wicked is not arbitrary, but is a matter of strict justice on account of their evil merits."

At the heart of the controversy were the five propositions of Gottschalk. These can be summarized as follows:

1. God foreordains both the elect and the reprobate: Gottschalk argued that God, in his sovereignty, has predetermined not only who would be saved but also who would be damned. This double predestination was a central feature of Gottschalk’s theology.

2. The certainty of salvation and perdition: Gottschalk asserted that the eternal destinies of individuals were fixed. Those elected by God could not lose their salvation, while the reprobate were inevitably destined for perdition.

3. God does not will the salvation of all people: Gottschalk contended that God’s will was selective, choosing only the elect for salvation. He argued that when the Bible speaks of God’s desire for all to be saved, this "all" referred exclusively to the elect.

4. Limited atonement: Consistent with his doctrine of predestination, Gottschalk believed that Christ’s atoning death was intended only for the elect, not for all humanity.

5. Human freedom is limited to only evil: Gottschalk taught that humanity had no ability to choose good apart. After the fall, human will was bound to sin and incapable of turning to God.

== Council of Quierzy, 849 ==
The Council of Quierzy occurred six months after the Council at Mainz, when he was again questioned about his doctrine in an attempt to break his belief making him accept that the other bishops were correct. Gathered at this meeting were many notable including Archbishop Hincmar and King Charles the Bald the council was determined to prove Gottschalk's ideas incorrect and his readings of Augustine being wrong. Gottschalk allegedly burst into abuse following this refusal to accept the ideology of twin predestination. In response to this Gottschalk was stripped of his priestly status, whipped, and held in custody at the monastery of Hautvillers Abbey in silence. Gottschalk was forced to burn the writings that he had taken to the council, and was 'beaten nearly to death' on the command of lower ranking abbots not those in ecclesiastical office.

== Writings ==
From the 17th century, when the Jansenists exalted Gottschalk, much has been written on him. Two studies are F. Picavet, Les Discussions sur la liberté au temps de Gottschalk, de Raban Maur, d'Hincmar, et de Jean Scot, in Comptes rendus de l'acad. des sciences morales et politiques (Paris, 1896); and A. Freystedt, Studien zu Gottschalks Leben und Lehre, in Zeitschrsft für Kirchengeschichte (1897), vol. xviii.

For many years he was believed to be the author of the Eclogue of Theodulus (Ecolga Theoduli) because both Theodulus and Gottscalk both mean "servant of God" in their respective languages, and because Gottschalk is believed to have known some Greek and the use of Greek names in the dialogue. This authorship theory was disputed by Karl Strecker in 1924. Strecker showed the writing style (poetic meter) of Theodulus was different. Most scholars now agree that Gottschalk was not the author of the Ecolga.

== Legacy ==
There are multiple parallels with the views of Gottschalk and the Protestant reformers, which is why some see him as a forerunner of Protestantism. His views share most similarities with John Calvin, his similarities include the doctrine of justification by faith alone, which his views seem to have mirrored. Doctrines similar to his, concerning predestination, have been expounded by many Roman Catholic Scholastics.

The 17th century Anglican Archbishop James Ussher also sided with Gottschalk for his predestinarian views.

== See also ==
- Augustinian soteriology
- Calvinism
- Five Points of Calvinism
- John Calvin
- Martin Luther
- Theological determinism
