= Wala of Corbie =

Advisor to Charlemagne

Wala (c. 755 – 31 August 836) was a son of Bernard, son of Charles Martel, and one of the principal advisers of his cousin Charlemagne, of Charlemagne's son Louis the Pious, and of Louis's son Lothair I. He succeeded his brother Adalard as abbot of Corbie and its new daughter foundation, Corvey, in 826 or 827. His feast day is 31 August

Originally a count (comes) attached to the palace under Charlemagne (811), Wala was forced to enter the monastery of Corbie in 814 as part of a purging of palace rivals and hangers-on by Louis the Pious. In 816 he and Adalard were given the responsibility of organising the government of the convent of Herford, recently passed into Louis's hands at the Council of Aachen. In the 820s Wala became a strong opponent of royal/imperial control of church benefices. He was back at court in 822 as a concillor (councillor). According to Paschasius Radbertus, Wala alleged on one occasion that the "army of clerics" (i.e. chaplains) resident at the Palace of Aachen (and perhaps itinerant with the emperor) served only for personal gain and did not form a legitimate ecclesiastical institution. In 831 Wala left Corbie; in 834 he was abbot of Bobbio.

== Early years ==
Wala was born the son of a Saxon woman and Count Bernard, who was a brother of Pepin the Third and a natural son of Charles Martel. Wala was therefore a first cousin of Charlemagne and a half-brother of Adalard the Younger, who served as abbot of Corbie until 826. Wala also had a full brother named Bernarius and two sisters, Gundrada and Theodrada, abbess of Notre-Dame de Soissons. In Wala's early years, he had been brought up in the school of the royal palace with Adalard the Younger. At court, both Wala and Adalard were known for being honest, honorable and zealous. As a youth, however, Wala incurred the temporary disapproval of his cousin Charles. In 792 it had been supposed that he was in some way involved with the conspiracy of Charles's son, Pepin The Hunchback. As a result, he was banned from court and forced to live under the close watch of some of the magnates loyal to Charles. He did, however, eventually regain royal favor. During this time, it is presumed that he married Rothlindis, daughter of William, count of Toulouse, and in doing so, became brother-in-law to Bernard of Barcelona. He was widowed before he became a monk in 814. During Charlemagne's rule, he rose to become the Emperor's second-in-command. Charlemagne appears to have appointed Wala to oversee the administration of Saxony, just as he had elevated his brother-in-law, Gerold, in Bavaria. Charlemagne seemed to rely confidently upon his capable cousins Adalard, Bernarius and Wala.

== Under Louis the Pious ==
Upon the death of Charlemagne, his son Louis the Pious was proclaimed the new emperor. Wala came to the new king and submitted homage as a part of the tradition of the Franks. However, in 814, in an effort to wipe out potential political disloyalty, Louis obliged Wala to become a monk at Corbie. Although nearly all Charlemagne's old advisors were removed from the royal sphere of influence, in 821 Louis recalled Adalard from his exile at the abbey of Corbie and sent an invitation to Wala to once again attend the Frankish court. Furthermore, in 822, realizing the rage caused by his maltreatment of his father's old advisors, he expressed public penance for his dismissal at Attigny-on-the-Aisne among his people. At this point, it appears that the old counselors of Charlemagne, including Adalard and Wala, reconciled with the emperor. Thus, in 822 Wala followed Adalard to court where he sought to meet with his father's old advisors. Upon the death of King Bernard in northern Italy in the autumn of 822, Wala, then forty-nine years old, was called by the emperor, Louis the Pious, to assist his son, Lothair I, in governing Italy and to serve as intermediary between the papacy in Italy.

== Rebellions ==
Wala was a strong advocate for the unity of the Frankish empire and on several occasions aided Lothair I, the eldest son of Louis the Pious, in rebellions against his father. In May 830, a short-lived rebellion involving those of both clerical and lay orders, as well as three elder sons of Louis, succeeded in forcing Empress Judith into monastic confinement at St. Radegunda in Poitiers and in sending her brothers to monasteries. They also succeeded in putting pressure on Louis to abdicate. The revolution was short-lived, however, and as a result, Wala suffered exile, first into a high mountainous region near Lake Geneva and secondly to Noirmoutier, where his brother Adalard had once been exiled. In 833 Wala, being recalled from exile, once again helped the three elder sons of Louis - Lothair, Louis the German and Pippin - to rise against their father, his empress Judith and her son, Charles. In an uprising caused by Louis's decision to remove the holding of Aquitaine from Pippin and give the same to Charles, Lothair kidnapped his father. When Louis returned to power, Wala (who had supported unity of the kingdom under Lothair) fled to Italy with Lothair and other supporters. In 836 Wala was forgiven his opposition and allowed to return to Italy because he persuaded Lothair to come see the Emperor. Wala died in Italy in 836.

== Monastic life ==
According to Vita Walae, the Epitaphium Arsenii written by Paschasius Radbertus, Wala fully embraced the life as a monk. According to Radbertus, Wala was content with the ordinary clothes and shoes of the region, and he considered it unnecessary that a monk should dress more smartly than the conprovintiales amongst whom he lived. He also strived to be loved rather than feared. After the Emperor's return to favor in 820's, Wala assisted his brother Adalard in the establishment of New Corvey. Wala played an important role in the establishment of daughter monastery in Saxony by his brother abbot Adalard. Wala successfully convinced Theodradus to give out his ancestral inheritance for the sake of New Corvey. Moreover, Wala's military abilities from the earlier days of his life prevented Saxon bandits from invading the lands to be taken up by new monastery. After his service in Italy, Wala returned to Francia in 825. With Emperor Louis's approval, Adalard, Wala undertook a journey to Saxony and formally organized the daughter community. Moreover, during his stay in Italy to guide the emperor's son, Lothair, Wala also acquired a copy of the Roman antiphonary for his abbey of Corbie. He also took special interest in the Danish mission of Ansgar, a monk of both Corbie and New Corvey. He succeeded his brother Adalard upon his death to become the abbot of Corbie in 826.

== Ideas on reforms ==
Wala was restored to Court by Louis the Pious in 821, where he voiced his opinions on church and state reforms. Wala tried to establish procedures to control the exploitation of wealth by the Carolingian state officials. In a letter addressed to him and Archchaplain Hilduin in 826, Bishop Agobard observed that Wala was always at court as one of the very godly advisers of Louis the Pious. Many sources strongly suggest that Wala was opposed to the idea of partition of the empire amongst Louis's four sons and favored the unity of the empire. Although Wala attributed weakening of the empire to movement towards secularization, depriving the church of its rights (in the meanwhile bishops occupied themselves with state affairs), he believed that it was the right of the church to intervene in matters such as partition of the kingdom. In 829, Paschasisus Radbert wrote in his Life of Wala, Wala at forefront talking "of the greed and avarice of the chaplains of the royal Court; of layman placed in rule over monasteries, "... a "filthy disease within the Church" of the corrupted clerics in the church. Wala believed that some of these clerics and chaplains had no religious authority and served for no reason other than for the sake of their profit.
