= Ruodhaid (concubine of Charles Martel) =

Ruodhaid was a concubine of Charles Martel, with whom she had the following children:

- Bernard (c. 720–787)
- Hieronymus (c. 722- after 782)
- Remigius, Archbishop of Rouen (d. 771)
- Aldana, wife of Theoderich, Count of Autun
