= Gerald of Sauve-Majeure =

11th-century Benedictine abbott and saint

Saint Gerald of Sauve-Majeure OSB
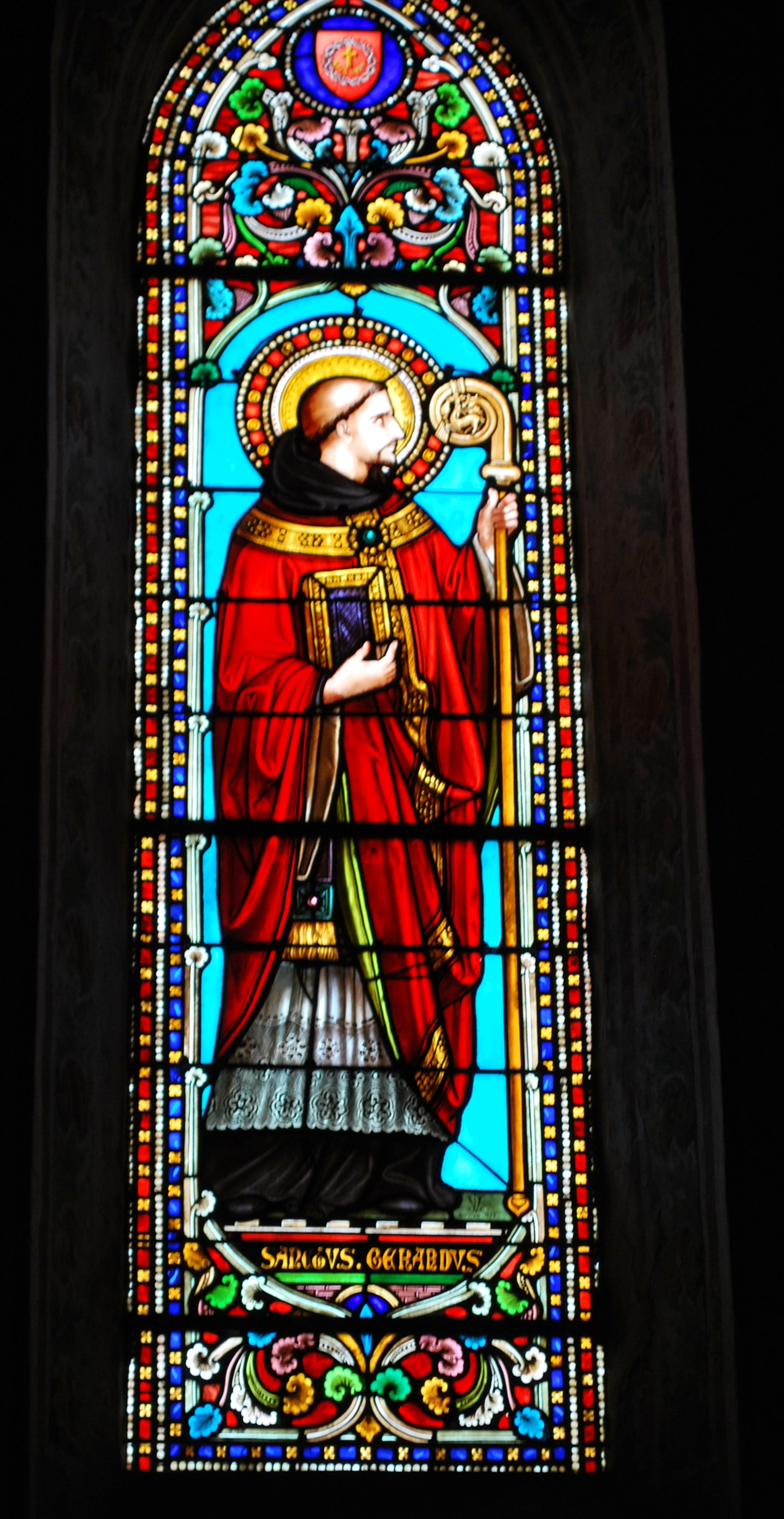
- Born: 1025; Corbie
- Died: 1095; La Sauve-Majeure
- Venerated in: Catholic Church
- Canonized: 27 April 1197 by Pope Celestine III
- Major shrine: Grande-Sauve Abbey
- Feast: 5 April

Saint Gerald of Sauve-Majeure, OSB (sometimes also Gerard or Geraud) (c. 1025–1095), also known, from his place of origin, as Gerald of Corbie, was a Benedictine abbot.

== Life ==
Saint Gerald was born in Corbie, Picardy, and was educated at the Corbie Abbey, where he later became a monk and cellarer. He suffered greatly from violent headaches which prevented him from carrying out his devotions. In an effort to cure them he made a pilgrimage with his abbot to seek the intercession of Saint Michael at Monte Gargano and that of Saint Benedict at Monte Cassino. While at Rome he was ordained by Pope Leo IX. On his return, he was healed of the severe headaches by the intercession of Saint Adalard, a former abbot of Corbie, of whom Gerald wrote a hagiography.

He later made a pilgrimage to Palestine, after which he was elected abbot of St. Vincent's Abbey, Laon, but the monks did not accept his authority or the imposition of proper discipline. After some five years, he resigned from Laon in order to become abbot of St. Medard's Abbey, Soissons, but was driven out by a usurper.

He then sought instead to found a new Benedictine monastery. Duke William VIII of Aquitaine gave him a huge tract of forest in the Gironde near Bordeaux, where Gerald founded the abbey of Grande-Sauve, of which he was also the first abbot. This developed into a powerful community for the advancement of the Benedictine Rule and mode of life, with significant influence from the customs of Cluny. Gerald began the practice of celebrating mass and the Office for the Dead for 30 days after the death of a community member. His constant advice to his monks for as long as he lived was that they should shun all discussion. He died at Grande-Sauve Abbey.

== Veneration ==
He was canonized on 27 April 1197 by Pope Celestine III. His feast day is 5 April.

== Sources ==
- Saints.SQPN.com
- Saint of the Day, April 5 at SaintPatrickDC.org
- (in Norwegian) Katolsk.no
