= Roman Science: Origins, Development, and Influence to the Later Middle Ages =

1962 book by William Harris Stahl

- Author: William Harris Stahl
- Language: English
- Subjects: History of science
- Publisher: University of Wisconsin Press
- Publication date: 1962
- ISBN: 9780313204739

Roman Science: Origins, Development, and Influence to the Later Middle Ages is a book by science historian William Harris Stahl, published in 1962 by University of Wisconsin Press.

== Synopsis ==
This book covers the history of science in the Latin-speaking West from its Greek origins to the time of the Graeco-Arabic revival, focusing on the influence of Greek science in the Latin world, and on how this influence shaped both scientific education and scientific culture all the way to the Middle Ages. The volume follows what the author calls "the handbooks movement", the production of encyclopedic material originating with Greek authors, such as Posidonius and Theon of Smyrna, and follows this tradition among the Romans. Stahl devotes specific chapters to Pliny, Solinus, Chalcidius, Macrobius, Capella, Boethius, Cassiodorus, Isidore, Bede, and other authors till about 1250, and discusses the genesis and subsequent development of the liberal arts in the Quadrivium and Trivium from the age of Plato (428–424 BC) and Isocrates (436–338 BC) till the Middle Ages and Renaissance.

== Content ==
The initial section on "Classical Greek Origins" treats the discoveries of Aristarchus of Samos, Pythagora, the Sophists Hippias of Elis and Isocrates, Plato, the mathematician Eudoxus – credited with the invention of the Method of exhaustion – and Aristotle. The mathematicians Euclid, Archimedes, Apollonius of Perga and Hipparchus are described in the section of the early Hellenistic tradition, together with the early botanist Theophrastus who headed the Peripatetic school after Aristotle, and Eratosthenes of Cyrenes. The first section of the work of Stahl ends with a chapter entitled "The Posidonian Age", from Posidonius (c. 135-51 BC) that marks the period when a Greek, mostly Stoic tradition, opens a "lengthy period of mutual admiration" between the Greek and Roman intellectuals. The chapter tells how the historian Polybius and the Stoic philosopher Panaetius were invited to the Scipionic Circle and of the friendship between Posidonius and Cicero. Though no work of Posidonius has reached us, his writings were used extensively by Cicero in his works, and influenced later authors such as Marcus Aurelius and Seneca.

Authors treated in the central section of Roman science, beside Pliny, include Cato the Elder, Cicero, Varro, Lucretius, Pomponius Mela, Vitruvius, Celsus, and Lucius Annaeus Seneca. Marcus Agrippa has a special mention for his approach of measuring the length and breadth of each province of the Roman Empire by computing distances recorded on the milestones on the imperial highways.

Nicomachus and Apuleius are treated in the chapter on the second century AD, while Latin neoplatonist encyclopedists Solinus, Calcidius, Macrobius, and Martianus Capella are treated in the chapter on Third- and Fourth-Century Cosmography.

The last part of the volume describes the short period of Ostrogothic renaissance, with Boethius and Cassiodorus, then moves to Isidore of Seville and Bede, and concludes with the 12th century and the School of Chartres. From the twelfth century onward, Latin translations of Arabic and Greek works were to revolutionise the intellectual life of Western Europe and diminish the predominance of the Latin encyclopedists.

The themes treated in the volume were anticipated in an article of the same title that Stahl published in 1959 in the journal Isis.

The author is critical of the way Roman authors treated quadrivium (arithmetic, geometry, music and astronomy) – but also geography – in their handbooks. Stahl faults the Romans and their handbooks for the low scientific level, the mechanical borrowing from one author to the next, the absence of new ideas, and the instrumental use of referencing – authors citing primary sources they had not read, and not acknowledging the secondary sources they had read instead.

The fact that any of these handbooks, Greek or Latin, quotes an original source cannot be taken for evidence that the compiler was himself acquainted with that source, as the quotations could have come from intermediate works.

Contents
Part	Chapter
Part One: Greek Origins	I. Introduction
Part One: Greek Origins	II. Classical Greek Origins
Part One: Greek Origins	III. Early Hellenistic Handbook Tradition
Part One: Greek Origins	IV. The Posidonian Age
Part Two: Roman Science of the Republic and the Western Empire	V. Late Republican Times
Part Two: Roman Science of the Republic and the Western Empire	VI. Expanding Horizons in the Augustan Age
Part Two: Roman Science of the Republic and the Western Empire	VII. Pliny's Theoretical Science
Part Two: Roman Science of the Republic and the Western Empire	VIII. Science in the Second Century the Posidonian Age
Part Two: Roman Science of the Republic and the Western Empire	IX. Third- and Fourth-Century Cosmography
Part Two: Roman Science of the Republic and the Western Empire	X. Fifth Century Neoplatonic Commentator
Part Two: Roman Science of the Republic and the Western Empire	XI. Fifth Century Varronian Encyclopedist
Part Three: Roman Scient in the Middle Ages	XII. Classical Learning Under the Ostrogotis
Part Three: Roman Scient in the Middle Ages	XIII. Encyclopedic Science in the Borderlands
Part Three: Roman Scient in the Middle Ages	XIV. Roman Survivals in the Later Middle Ages
Part Three: Roman Scient in the Middle Ages	XV. Conclusions

== Reception ==
Otto E. Neugebauer faults Stahl for ignoring relevant elements of Roman science: the Roman calendar, the agrimensores, and authors such as Manilius and Firmicus Maternus. He is also critical of Dahl's expansive use of the term "handbook" to cover a plurality of different types of works.

Funtowicz and Ravetz read in the work of Stahl a warning of how "science is an ongoing process, and not tables of enshrined truths". Thus science can degenerate to the banality and plagiarism denounced by Stahl if deprived of the stimulus of new research.

For Abraham Wasserstein, the merit of Stahl's work is that it provides a "history and aetiology of a great failure" of Roman civilization – that of not building on the foundations laid by their Hellenic predecessors, thus failing "the great task imposed upon them by history: to continue, develop, or at least transmit faithfully the inheritance of Greek science".
