= Ratramnus =

9th-century Frankish monk and theologian

Ratramnus (died c. 868) was a Frankish monk of the monastery of Corbie, near Amiens in northern France, and a Carolingian theologian known best for his writings on the Eucharist and predestination. His Eucharistic treatise De corpore et sanguine Domini (On the Body and Blood of the Lord) was a counterpoint to his abbot Paschasius Radbertus’s realist Eucharistic theology. Ratramnus was also known for his defense of the monk Gottschalk, whose theology of double predestination was the center of much controversy in 9th-century France and Germany. In his own time, Ratramnus was perhaps best known for his Against the Objections of the Greeks who Slandered the Roman Church, a response to the Photian schism and defense of the filioque addition to the Niceno-Constantinopolitan Creed. The writings of Ratramnus influenced the Protestant reformation of the 16th century.

== Biography ==
Little is known of Ratramnus’ life, but some have suggested that he became the teaching master at the Benedictine monastery of Corbie in 844, when Paschasius Radbertus was made abbot. Additionally, he appears to have had a reasonably close relationship with King Charles the Bald.

== The Eucharist ==
Sometime around 831-833, Paschasius Radbertus, in his role as a teacher in the monastery at Corbie, wrote De corpore et sanguine Domini (Concerning the Body and Blood of the Lord), articulating the view that in the moment of consecration, the bread and wine on the altar became identical with the body and blood of Jesus Christ. Paschasius was clear that the body and blood on the altar are precisely the same natural body and blood as Christ’s incarnate body on earth. In his description of the Eucharist, Paschasius drew a distinction between figura (figure) and veritas (truth), which he understood to mean “outward appearance” and “what faith teaches”, respectively. No controversy seems to have arisen as a result of Paschasius’s treatise, which he first composed likely as a teaching aid and dedicated to one of his former students. Later, probably in 844, Paschasius also composed a revision of his book on the Eucharist, dedicated to Charles the Bald.

When Charles the Bald visited Corbie in 843, he apparently met Ratramnus and requested an explanation of the Eucharist. It was to the emperor, then, that Ratramnus addressed his work, also entitled De corpore et sanguine Domini. In this book, Ratramnus advocated a spiritual view in which the bread and the wine of the Eucharist represent Christ’s body and blood figuratively and serve as a remembrance of him, but are not truly (perceptible by the senses) Christ’s body and blood. Ratramnus used the same two terms (figura and veritas) to describe the Eucharist as Paschasius, but used them differently. For him, veritas meant “perceptible to the senses”, so the Eucharist could not truly be Christ’s body and blood, as it – according to the senses – did not change in appearance, but remained bread and wine, nor was it literally Christ’s historical incarnate body.

No condemnations were issued as a result of the debate, and neither of the two monks quoted or referred to the other in his work. On account of this, Willemien Otten has challenged the traditional interpretation of Paschasius's and Ratramnus’s different positions as a “controversy”.

== Predestination ==
In the 840s and 50s, Ratramnus became involved in the controversy over the teachings of Gottschalk of Orbais (ca. 803-68). Ratramnus probably first encountered Gottschalk during the wandering teacher’s stay at the monastery of Corbie around 830, and later supported him in his conflict with archbishop Hincmar of Rheims. Gottschalk taught a form of double predestination, teaching that God predestined the fates of both the elect and the damned.

In 851, John Scotus Eriugena was commissioned to oppose Gottschalk’s teaching, but his work, Treatise on Divine Predestination, essentially denied any form of predestination whatsoever, a denial which raised the ire of Ratramnus and Florus of Lyon. In response, Ratramnus composed the two-book work On the Predestination of God (De Praedestinatione Dei), in which he defended double predestination, while objecting to the relation of predestination to sin.

== Filioque ==
Late in Ratramnus’ life, he responded to the Photian schism of 863-7 between Eastern and Western Christianity over the appointment of Photius as Patriarch of Constantinople. This wide-ranging controversy spanned various East-West disagreements, such as the appointment of the patriarch, ecclesiastical jurisdiction in Bulgaria, and the Western addition of filioque to the Niceno-Constantinopolitan Creed. Ratramnus’ defense of Western theology and practice in his Against the Objections of the Greeks who Slandered the Roman Church, is largely occupied with proving the filioque, although the final section of the work deals with other disagreements, such as the monastic tonsure and priestly celibacy.

== Other works ==
In another show of support for Gottschalk, Ratramnus composed a short collection of patristic texts in favor of Gottschalk’s Trinitarian formulation of trina deitas against Hincmar of Rheims’ proposed summa deitas.

Ratramnus also wrote a Letter on the Dog-headed Creatures. This was in response to a question from Rimbert, then working as a missionary in Scandinavia, who asked whether the cynocephali believed to live nearby were human, because if they were Rimbert would be expected to attempt to convert them. Ratramnus argued that because Rimbert’s sources described the cynocephali as living in villages and engaging in agriculture and crafts, they must be rational and therefore human.

Ratramnus wrote another treatise, The Birth of Christ, possibly as a response to Paschasius’ De Partu Virginis. In this work, Ratramnus defended the idea that Christ’s birth from the Virgin Mary occurred in the natural human way, so as to not detract from Christ’s real human nature.

Ratramnus wrote two treatises on the soul, upholding traditional Augustinian psychology. The first, On the Soul, was written against someone named Macarius Scotus, and the second, The Book on the Soul, addressed to bishop Odo I of Beauvais, challenged an idea raised by an anonymous monk of Fly Abbey – that all human beings participate in a universal soul. In The Book on the Soul, Ratramnus argued that a soul cannot be universal, only individual.

On a whole, Ratramnus’ works have been described by medieval scholar Giulio D'Onofrio as marked by a careful methodological clarity and consistency possibly modeled on Boethius’ Answer to Eutyches.

== Later reception ==
At some point, Ratramnus’ Eucharistic work De corpore et sanguine Domini came to be identified as the work of John Scotus Eriugena. In the 11th century, Berengar of Tours seized upon “Scotus’” book as a source for his view of the Eucharist in his debate with Lanfranc of Bec, and was summarily condemned by the local Council of Vercelli in 1050. Around 1100, further confusion arose when Ratramnus’ name was mistakenly copied in some works as Bertramus, a mistake which endured even into the 19th century.

In the 16th century, Ratramnus’ work once more became the center of controversy. After De corpore et sanguine Domini was printed in 1531, Protestant reformers seized upon the book as a counterpoint to the Catholic doctrine of transubstantiation. It was especially influential in England, where Thomas Cranmer claimed to have been finally convinced against transubstantiation by Ratramnus.

== Works and editions ==
- Contra Graecorum opposita (Contra Græcorum opposita), edited by Luc d'Achery in 1723, and Jacques Paul Migne (Patrologia Latina, 121),
- De anima, edited by André Wilmart in 1931,
- De cynocephalis, edited by Ernst Ludwig Dümmler in 1902,
- De nativitate Christi, edited by José María Canal Sánchez-Pagín in 1968,
- De praedestinatione Dei, edited by Timothy Roland Roberts in 1977,
- Liber de anima ad Odonem Bellovacensem, edited by Cyrille Lambot in 1952.

== See also ==
- Augustinian soteriology
