= Hadoard =

Librarian in Corbie Abbey

Hadoard or Hadoardus was a priest and presumed librarian (custos librorum) in Corbie Abbey during the ninth century. He is known for two surviving collectanea, or anthologies of extracts. One of these (now Vatican Reg. lat. 1762) draws primarily from the philosophical works of Cicero. It also contains excerpts from Macrobius and Martianus Capella, as well as an introductory poem of 112 lines that echoes classical poets. A collection of excerpts from St. Augustine and other patristic authorities is preserved in Paris, BnF n.a.l. 13381.

== Literature ==
- Charles H. Beeson, The Collectaneum of Hadoard, Classical Philology, Vol. 40, No. 4 (Oct., 1945), pp. 201-222
- Charles H. Besson, Lupus of Ferrières and Hadoard, Classical Philology, 43 (1948), 190-91
- Bernhard Bischoff, "Hadoard und die Klassikerhss. aus Corbie", Mittelalterliche Studien 1 (Stuttgart 1966) 49-63
- Bernhard Bischoff, Katalog der festländischen Handschriften des neunten Jahrhunderts (mit Ausnahme der wisigotischen). Teil III: Padua - Zwickau, Veröffentlichungen der Kommission für die Herausgabe der mittelalterlichen Bibliothekskataloge Deutschlands und der Schweiz, 2014
- David Ganz, Corbie in the Carolingian Renaissance (Sigmaringen, 1990)
