= Adalard of Corbie =

Frankish abbot and saint

Saint Adalard
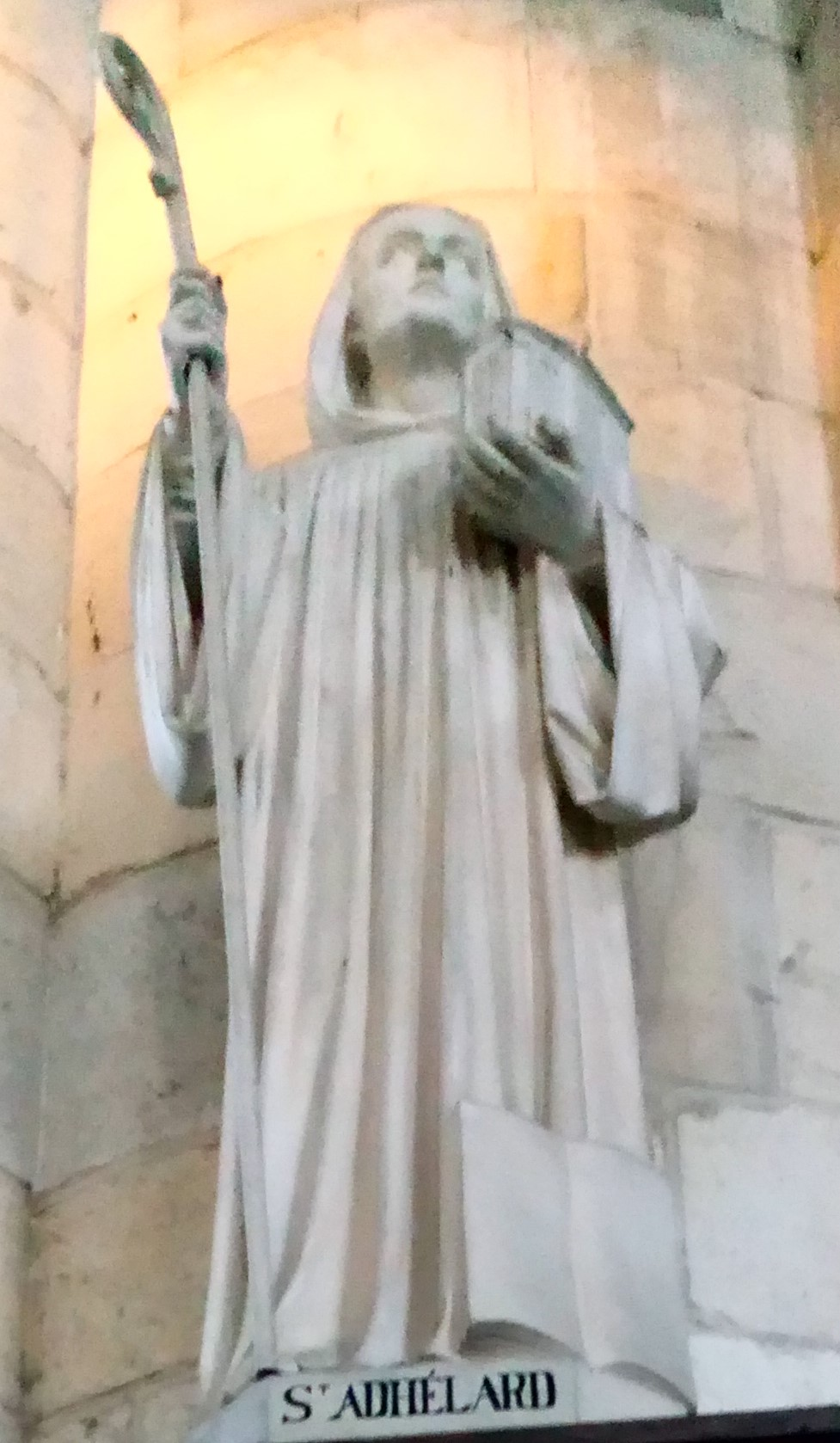
- Born: 751; Huise
- Died: 2 January 827
- Venerated in: Catholicism; Eastern Orthodoxy
- Canonized: 1024 by Pope John XIX
- Attributes: Bishop giving alms
- Patronage: Patron of many churches and towns in France and along the lower Rhine

Adalard of Corbie (Latin: Adalhardus Corbeiensis; c. 751, Huise – 2 January 827) was the son of Bernard who was the son of Charles Martel and half-brother of Pepin; Charlemagne was his cousin. He is recognised as a saint within the Roman Catholic and Eastern Orthodox Church.

== Biography ==
Adalard received a good education in the Palatine School at the Court of Charlemagne in Aachen, and while still very young was made Count of the Palace. At the age of twenty, he entered the monastery at Corbie in Picardy, a monastery that had been founded by queen Bathild, in 662. In order to be more secluded, he went to Monte Cassino, but was ordered by Charlemagne to return to Corbie, where he was elected abbot. At the same time, Charlemagne made him prime minister to his son Pepin, King of Italy, in the Carolingian Empire. As a high court administrator, he attended some meetings that discussed military planning. His De ordine palatinii discusses in some detail a well-developed intelligence system by the end of Pepin's reign. At his death in Milan in 810, Pepin appointed Adalard tutor to his son Bernard of Italy, then but twelve years of age.

When, in 817, Bernard, son of Pepin, aspired to the imperial crown, emperor Louis the Pious suspected Adalard of being in sympathy with Bernard and banished him to Hermoutier, the modern Noirmoutier, on the island of the same name. Adalard's brother Wala was obliged to become a monk at Corbie. After seven years Louis saw his mistake and made Adalard one of his chief advisers.

Several hospitals were erected by him. In 822 Adalard and his brother Wala founded Corvey Abbey ("New Corbie") in Westphalia. Corvey was an imperial abbey; its territory extended from the bishopric of Paderborn to the duchy of Brunswick. Its abbot was one of the eleven abbots, who sat with twenty-one bishops in the imperial diet at Regensburg.

Adalard was returning from Corvey to old Corbie when he fell sick three days before Christmas: he died about three in the afternoon, on January 1 in the year 827, at the age of seventy-three.

Shortly after his death, the Vitae Adalhardi was written by Paschasius Radbertus, who admired Adalhard greatly.

== Veneration ==
Adalard is honoured as patron saint of many churches and towns in France and along the lower Rhine.

== See also ==
- De ordine palatii, a work based on a lost treatise by Adalard
- List of Carolingian monasteries
- Carolingian Renaissance

== Literature ==
- Brigitte Kasten: Adalhard von Corbie. Die Biographie eines karolingischen Politikers und Klostervorstehers. Studia hmanoria, Droste Verlag, Düsseldorf 1985, ISBN 978-3-7700-0803-2.

== Ancestry ==
Ancestors of Adalard of Corbie

Pepin of Herstal
Charles Martel
Alpaida
Bernhard
Ruodhaid
Adalard of Corbie
Gundelindis
