= Maurdramnus Bible =

8th-century Carolingian bible manuscript

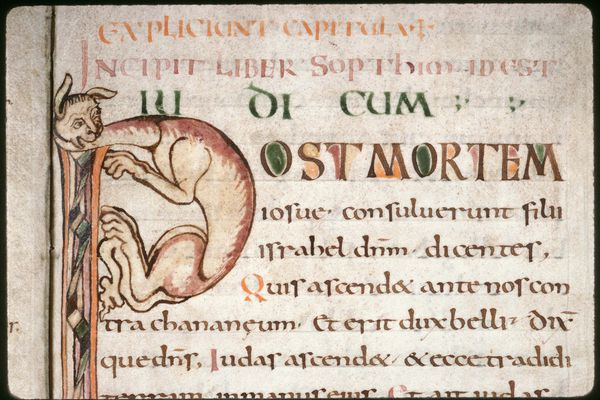
Start of the Books of Maccabees in the Maurdramnus Bible, copied by Maurdramnus himself

The Maurdramnus Bible is a Bible manuscript that originated approximately between 772 and 781 AD. It consists of 12 or 13 volumes and was written in the Benedictine Abbey in the French town of Corbie. The commission for this manuscript came from the abbot of the monastery, Maurdramnus. The Maurdramnus Bible is significant as the earliest evidence of the so-called Carolingian minuscule.

During the reign of Charlemagne, the notion spread throughout the entire realm that the Bible was the ideal source of knowledge and wisdom, to be consulted for proper guidance in life. In this context, it was the endeavour of Charlemagne and his successor, Louis the Pious, to provide the kingdom with a unified and authentic edition of the Bible. Charlemagne was not only concerned with the correctness of liturgical proceedings; proper spelling and grammar were also significant to him. Especially in terms of linguistic accuracy, the Carolingian minuscule originating from Corbie was advantageous for him. It distinguished itself through clarity and simplicity in script, thus facilitating the flawless copying and dissemination of texts. According to some scholars the multi-volume Bible edition by Maurdramnus served as the basis for single-volume Bible codices from the Carolingian era, such as those by Alcuin of York. However, contrary to common belief, Charlemagne never commissioned Alcuin to create an accurate version of the Bible for the realm. Instead, the task was to produce a single-volume version of the Bible. Today, only five out of the total 12 or 13 volumes exist in the Municipal Library of Amiens.
