= Remigius of Rouen =

Archbishop of Rouen, France

Saint Remigius of Rouen
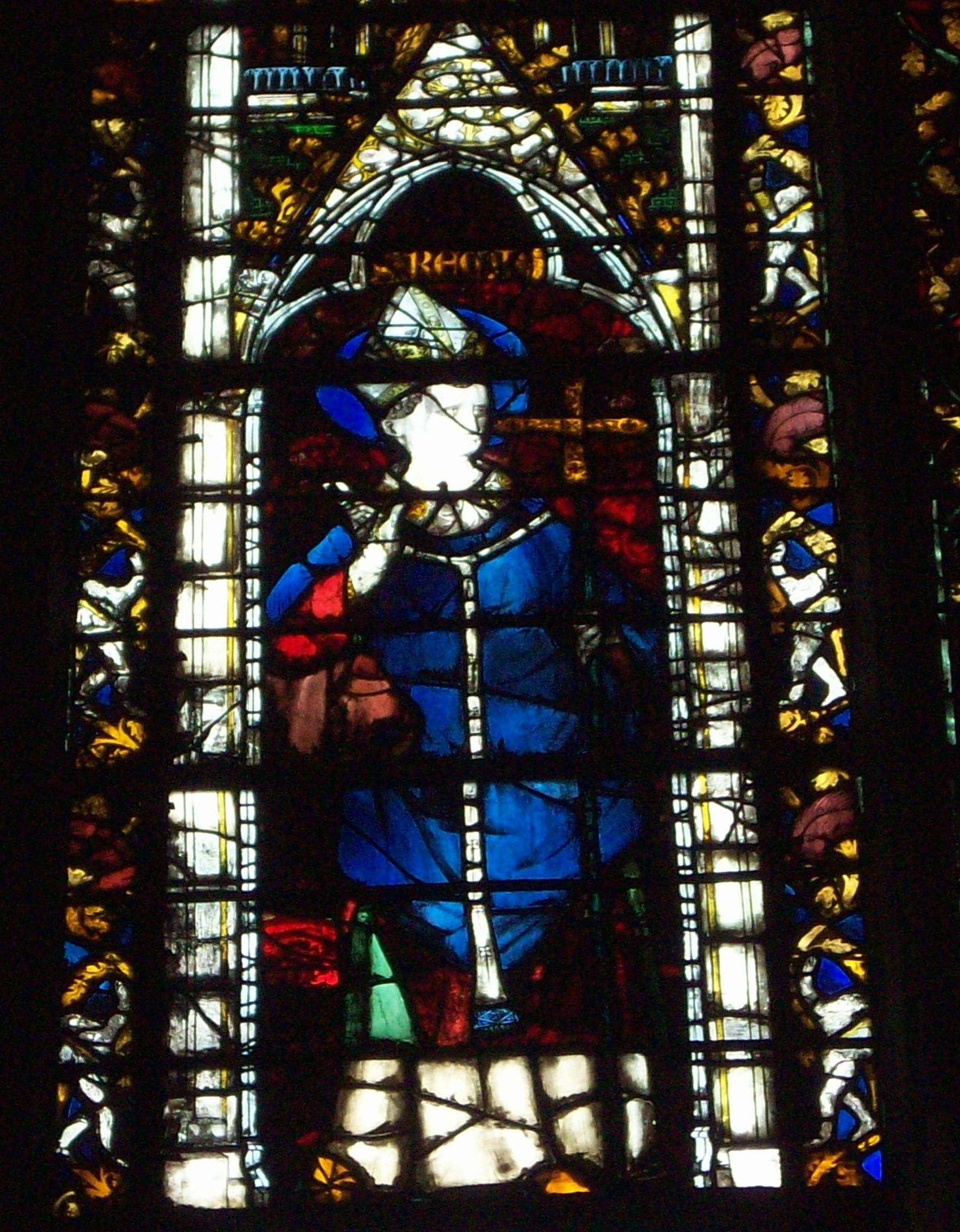

Saint
- Born: Remigius c. 727-730
- Died: c. 772
- Feast: January 19

Remigius (or Remi) (died 772) was the illegitimate son of Charles Martel and an unknown mistress. He was also the third archbishop of Rouen from 755 to 772.

== Life ==
Remigius was educated at court, but, along with his brothers, (Bernard and Hieronymus) was denied any share of his father's patrimony which was apportioned among Charles' legitimate sons. In 737, he was sent with his half brother Pepin the Short to strengthen Charles' hold on Burgundy.

In 755, Remigius became Archbishop of Rouen. In 760, he accompanied Pepin to Italy, with his two brothers to mediate between Pope Paul I and Desiderius. Upon his return, he brought with him an instructor from The Schola Cantorum of Rome to teach his clergy Roman chants.

Remigius died in 772; in 1090, his relics were translated to the Abbaye Saint-Ouen de Rouen. During the turmoil of the Reformation in 1562 his reliquary was lost. His feast day is January 19. He was instrumental in implementing the Roman rite and chant in the Gallic church.

== Sources ==
- Genealogie der Franken (German)
