= Hieronymus, son of Charles Martel =

Frankish noble (c. 722 - after 782)

Hieronymus (Jerome) (c. 722 - after 782), was the son of Charles Martel and his mistress, and so was the half-brother of Bernard, Abbot of St. Quentin, a key confidant of Louis the Pious, and Remigius, the third Archbishop of Rouen.

In 754, Hieronymus was tasked with Fulradus, abbot of St. Denys, and others, to escort Pope Stephen II back to Rome. This was following King Pipin's victorious campaign against his archenemy Aistulf, King of the Lombards. He became lay abbot of the monastery of St. Quentin in the diocese of Noyon. He was succeeded by his son Fulrad.

Hieronymus married Ercheswinda (Ermentrudis), origins unknown, and they had four children:

- Audoen I
- Fulrad (d. 31 January 826), Abbé de Saint-Quentin and a missus dominicus of Charlemagne in 806.
- Richarda, married Nithard (c. 795–844), a Frankish historian.
- Folcuin (d. 15 Dec 855), Bishop of Thérouanne, 817–855.

Settipani suggests that Boso of Provence descended from Hieronymus, although there does not appear to be any real evidence to support this.

== Sources ==
Settipani, Christian, La préhistoire des Capétiens 481-987, 1ère partie, Mérovingiens, Carolingiens et Robertiens, Broché, 1993

Murray, J., A Dictionary of Christian Biography, Literature, Sects and Doctrines: Being a Continuations of the Dictionary of the Bible, Forgotten Books, 1882 (available on Internet Archive)
