= William Harris Stahl =

American historian

William Harris Stahl (New York 20 December 1908 – 20 April 1969) was an American historian of science and professor of classics at New York University and Brooklyn College, known for his translation of Macrobius' Commentary on the Dream of Scipio and his 1962 book Roman Science.

== Career ==
Stahl studied at the New York University and obtained his doctorate there in 1934 from the Graduate School of Arts and Science with the thesis The Moon in Early Medicine. He remained at NYU, eventually becoming chair of the Classics Department. In 1956 he became professor and head of the Department of Classics and Comparative Literature at Brooklyn College in New York.

In 1969 Stahl had finished the first volume and was putting the finishing touches to the second volume of his book Martianus Capella and the Seven Liberal Arts when he died of a heart attack. Volume I was published posthumously, and in 1977 E. L. Burge completed the second volume.

== Publications ==
- 1934. The Moon in Early Medicine: A study of medico-lunar beliefs, based upon the statements of the medical writers from Hippocrates to Paulus Aegineta, and continued through the present day survivals of these beliefs. Ph.D. thesis, New York University.
- 1952. Macrobius, Commentary on the Dream of Scipio. Columbia University Press.
- 1953. Ptolemy's Geography: A Select Bibliography. New York Public Library.
- 1959. "Dominant Traditions in Early Medieval Latin Science". Isis, vol. 50, no. 2. pp. 95–124.
- 1962. Roman Science: Origins, Development, and Influence to the Later Middle Ages. University of Wisconsin Press, see Roman Science: Origins, Development, and Influence to the Later Middle Ages.
- 1971. Martianus Capella and the Seven Liberal Arts, Volume I: The Quadrivium of Martianus Capella: Latin Traditions in the Mathematical Sciences, 50 B.C. – A.D. 1250. Columbia University Press.
- 1977. Martianus Capella and the Seven Liberal Arts, Volume II: The Marriage of Philology and Mercury (translated by Stahl and Richard Johnson, with E. L. Burge). Columbia University Press.
