= De ordine palatii =

De ordine palatii (On the governance of the palace) is a treatise written by Hincmar, archbishop of Rheims, in 882 for Carloman II on the occasion of his accession to the throne of West Francia.

It claims to be based on a treatise of the same name by Adalhard, who was an adviser to Emperor Charlemagne and abbot of the monastery of Corbie, although this document has not survived.

In the treatise, Hincmar outlined the duties of a king and a system for the organisation of his palace, in an apparent attempt to restore Carolingian government to the form it had under Louis the Pious.

== Translations ==
Translations into English of the complete treatise are available in:

- Paul Edward Dutton (ed.), Carolingian Civilization: A Reader (New York, 1993), pp. 485–500
- David Herlihy, A History of Feudalism (New York, 1970), pp. 209–227

The Latin text and translation into French containing remarks is available in:

- Hincmar de Reims, De Ordine Palatii, Maurice Prou (ed.), Bibliothèque de l’Ecole des Hautes Etudes 58, Paris, Vieweg, 1885.

The Latin text and translation into German containing remarks is available in:

- Hincmarus Remensis, De Ordine Palatii, Thomas Gross und Rudolf Schieffer (ed.), Hannover:Hahn, 1980.
