= Charles Martel =

Frankish military and political leader (c. 688–741)

- Duke and Prince of the Franks; Mayor of the Palace
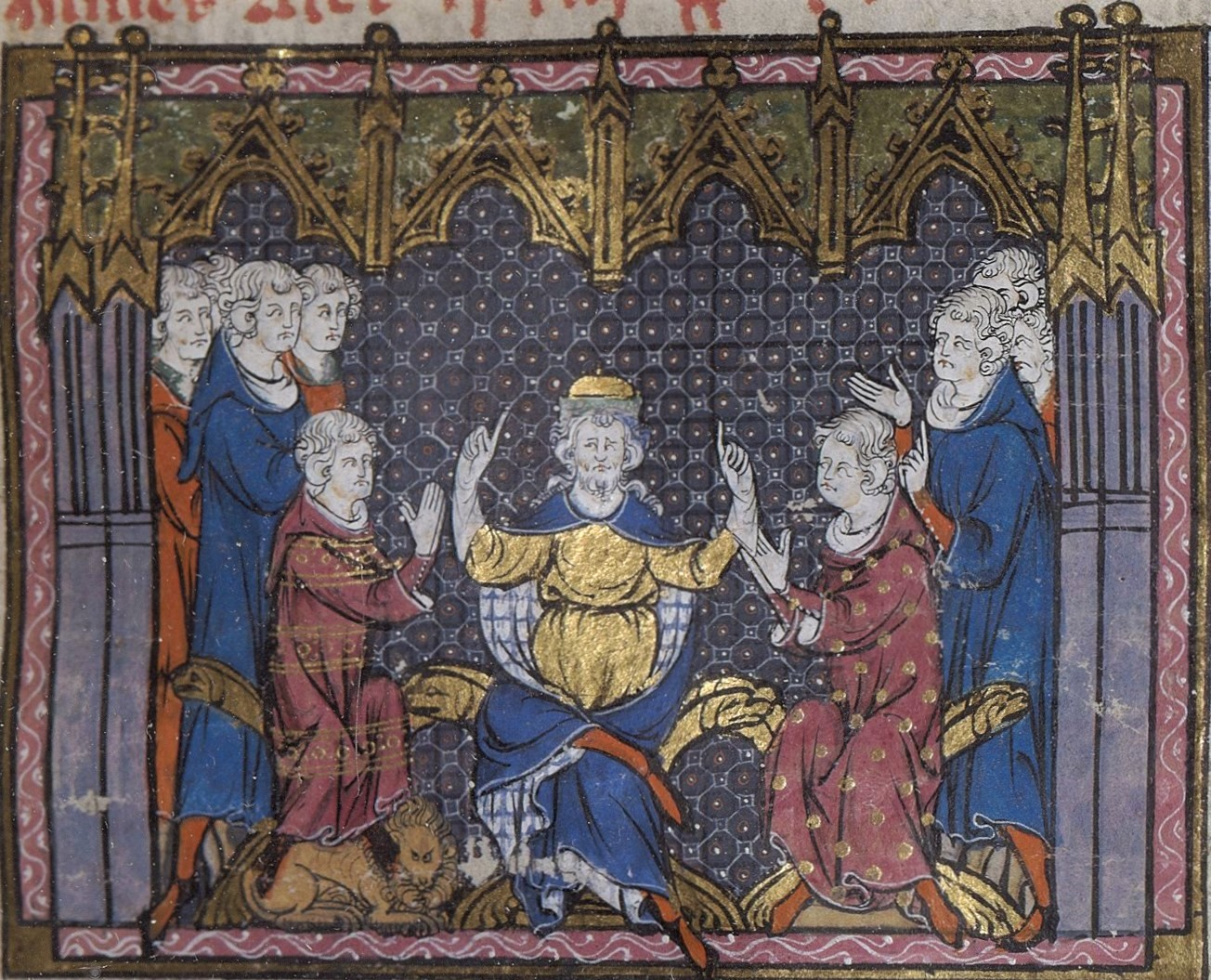
- 14th-century depiction of Charles Martel from the Grandes Chroniques de France

Duke and Prince of the Franks
- Reign: 718 – 22 October 741
- Predecessor: Pepin of Herstal
- Successor: Carloman; Pepin the Short

Mayor of the Palace of Austrasia
- Reign: 715 – 22 October 741
- Predecessor: Theudoald
- Successor: Carloman

Mayor of the Palace of Neustria
- Reign: 718 – 22 October 741
- Predecessor: Raganfrid
- Successor: Pepin the Short
- Born: 23 August c. 686 or 688; Herstal, Austrasia
- Died: 22 October 741; Quierzy, Frankish Empire
- Burial: Basilica of St Denis
- Spouse: Rotrude of Trier; Swanachild
- Issue: Carloman; Pepin the Short; Grifo; Bernard; Hieronymus; Remigius of Rouen; Hiltrud; Auda
- House: Arnulfings; Carolingian (founder)
- Father: Pepin of Herstal
- Mother: Alpaida

Charles Martel (/mɑːrˈtɛl/; c. 688 – 22 October 741), Martel being an Old French sobriquet meaning "The Hammer", was a Frankish political and military leader who, as Duke and Prince of the Franks and Mayor of the Palace, was the de facto ruler of the Franks from 718 until his death. He was a son of the Frankish statesman Pepin of Herstal and a noblewoman named Alpaida. Charles successfully asserted his claims to power as successor to his father as the power behind the throne in Frankish politics. Continuing and building on his father's work, he restored centralized government in Francia and began a series of military campaigns that re-established the Franks as the undisputed masters of all Gaul. According to the contemporary Liber Historiae Francorum, Charles was "a warrior who was uncommonly ... effective in battle".

Charles gained a victory against an Umayyad invasion of Aquitaine at the Battle of Tours, and Charles is credited as an important factor in curtailing the spread of Islam in Western Europe. Alongside his military endeavours, Charles has been traditionally credited with an influential role in the development of the Frankish system of feudalism.

At the end of his reign, Charles divided Francia between his sons, Carloman and Pepin; Pepin became the first king of the Carolingian dynasty. Pepin's son Charlemagne, grandson of Charles, extended the Frankish realms and became the first emperor in the West since the Fall of the Western Roman Empire.

== Background ==
Charles, nicknamed "Martel" ("the Hammer") in later chronicles, was a son of Pepin of Herstal and his mistress, possibly second wife, Alpaida. He had a brother named Childebrand who later became the Frankish dux (that is, duke) of Burgundy. Charles was a great-grandson of Arnulf of Metz.

Older historiography commonly describes Charles as "illegitimate", but the dividing line between wives and concubines was not clear-cut in 8th-century Francia. It is likely that the accusation of "illegitimacy" derives from the desire of Pepin's first wife Plectrude to see her progeny as heirs to Pepin's throne.

By Charles's lifetime the Merovingians had ceded power to the mayors of the palace who controlled the royal treasury, dispensed patronage, and granted land and privileges in the name of the figurehead king. Pepin of Herstal had united the Frankish realm by conquering Neustria and Burgundy. Pepin was the first to call himself Duke and Prince of the Franks, a title later taken up by Charles.

== Contesting for power ==
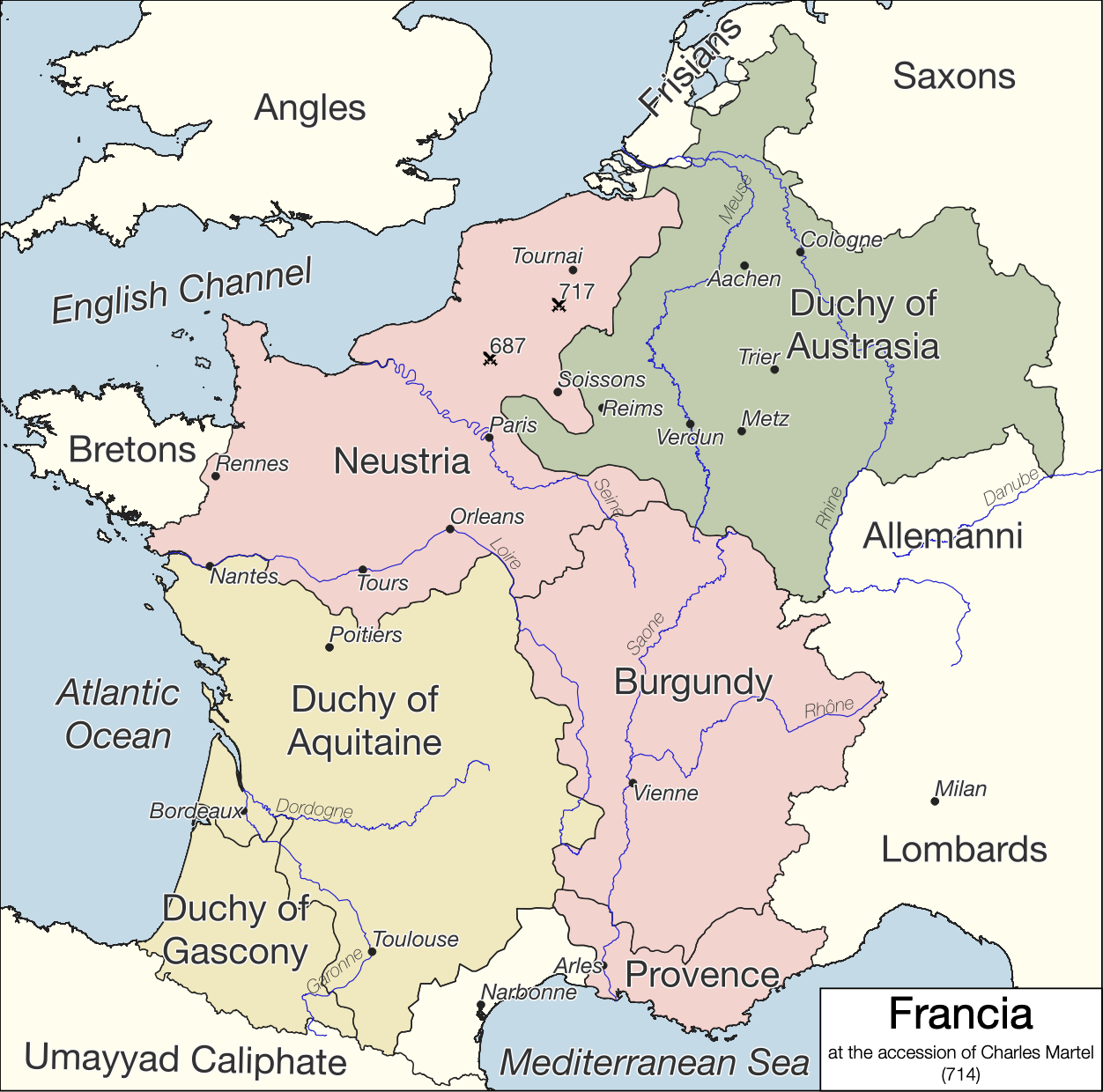
The Frankish kingdoms at the time of the death of Pepin of Herstal (714). Aquitaine (yellow) was outside Arnulfing authority and Neustria and Burgundy (pink) were united in opposition to further Arnulfing dominance of the highest offices. Only Austrasia (green) supported an Arnulfing mayor -- first Theudoald, then Charles. The German duchies to the east of the Rhine were de facto outside of Frankish suzerainty at this time.

In December 714 Pepin died. A few months before his death and shortly after the murder of his son Grimoald the Younger, he had taken the advice of Plectrude to designate as his sole heir Theudoald, his grandson by Grimoald. This was immediately opposed by the Austrasian nobles because Theudoald was a child of only eight years of age. To prevent Charles using this unrest to his own advantage, Plectrude had him imprisoned in Cologne, the city which was intended to be her capital. This prevented an uprising on his behalf in Austrasia, but not in Neustria.

=== Civil war of 715–718 ===
Pepin's death occasioned open conflict between his heirs and the Neustrian nobles who sought political independence from Austrasian control. In 715 Dagobert III named Raganfrid as mayor of the palace over Neustria and Burgundy. On 26 September 715, Raganfrid's Neustrians met the young Theudoald's forces at the Battle of Compiègne. Theudoald was defeated and fled back to Cologne. Before the end of the year, Charles had escaped from prison and was acclaimed mayor of the palace over Austrasia. Dagobert died in 715, and the Neustrians proclaimed Chilperic II, the cloistered son of Childeric II, as king.

==== Battle of Cologne ====
In 716, Chilperic and Raganfrid led an army into Austrasia intent on seizing the Pippinid wealth at Cologne. The Neustrians allied with another invading force under Radbod, King of the Frisians and met Charles in battle near Cologne, which was still held by Plectrude. Charles had little time to gather men or prepare, and the result was inevitable. Radbod held off Charles, while Chilperic and Raganfrid besieged Plectrude, where she bought them off with a substantial portion of Pepin's treasure. After that they withdrew. The Battle of Cologne was the only defeat of Charles's career.

==== Battle of Amblève ====
Charles retreated to the hills of the Eifel to gather and train men. In April 716 he fell upon the triumphant army near Malmedy as it was returning to Neustria. In the ensuing Battle of Amblève, Charles attacked as the enemy rested at midday. According to one source, he split his forces into several groups which fell at them from many sides. Another suggests that while this was his intention, he then decided that given the enemy's unpreparedness, this was not necessary. In any event, the suddenness of the assault led them to believe they were facing a much larger host. Many of the enemy fled, and Charles's troops gathered the spoils of the camp. His reputation increased considerably as a result, and he attracted more followers. This battle is often considered by historians as the turning point in Charles's struggle.

==== Battle of Vinchy ====
Richard Gerberding points out that up to this time, much of Charles's support was probably from his mother's kindred in the lands around Liège. After Amblève, he seems to have won the backing of the influential Willibrord, founder of the Abbey of Echternach. The abbey had been built on land donated by Plectrude's mother Irmina of Oeren, but most of Willibrord's missionary work had been carried out in Frisia. In joining Chilperic and Raganfrid, Radbod sacked Utrecht, burning churches and killing many missionaries. Willibrord and his monks were forced to flee to Echternach. Gerberding suggests that Willibrord had decided that the chances of preserving his life's work were better with a successful field commander like Charles than with Plectrude in Cologne. Willibrord subsequently baptized Charles's son Pepin. Gerberding suggests a likely date of Easter 716. Charles also received support from Bishop Pepo of Verdun.

Charles took time to rally more men and prepare. By the following spring, he had attracted enough support to invade Neustria. Charles sent an envoy who proposed a cessation of hostilities if Chilperic would recognize his rights as mayor of the palace in Austrasia. The refusal was not unexpected but served to impress upon Charles's forces the unreasonableness of the Neustrians. They met near Cambrai at the Battle of Vinchy on 21 March 717. The victorious Charles pursued the fleeing king and mayor to Paris, but as he was not yet prepared to hold the city, he turned back to deal with Plectrude and Cologne. He took the city and dispersed her adherents. Plectrude was allowed to retire to a convent. Theudoald lived to 741 under Charles's protection.

== Consolidation of power ==
Upon this success, Charles proclaimed Chlothar IV king in Austrasia in opposition to Chilperic and deposed Rigobert, archbishop of Reims, replacing him with Milo, a lifelong supporter. In 718 Chilperic responded to Charles's ascendancy by making an alliance with Odo the Great, the duke of Aquitaine, who had become independent during the civil war in 715. The alliance was defeated by Charles at the Battle of Soissons. Chilperic fled with Odo south of the Loire, and Raganfrid fled to Angers. Odo then surrendered Chilperic in exchange for Charles recognizing his dukedom. Charles recognized Chilperic as king of the Franks in return for legitimate royal affirmation of his own mayoralty over all the kingdoms.

=== Wars of 718–732 ===
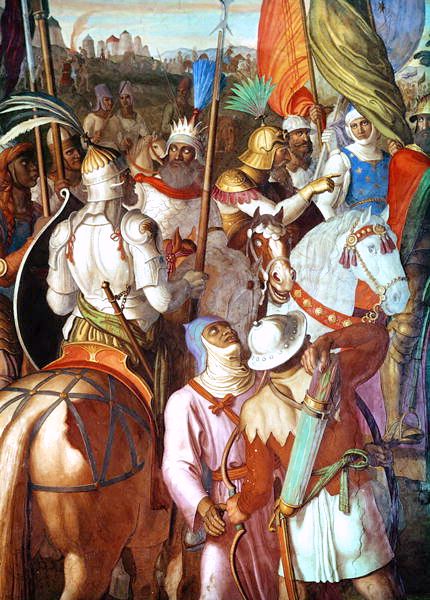
The Saracen Army outside Paris, 730–32, in an early-nineteenth-century depiction by Julius Schnorr von Carolsfeld

Between 718 and 732, Charles secured his power through a series of victories. Having unified Francia under his banner, Charles was determined to punish the Saxons who had invaded Austrasia. In late 718 he laid waste their country to the banks of the Weser, the Lippe, and the Ruhr, securing the northern Frankish border.

When Radbod died in 719, Charles seized West Frisia without any great resistance on the part of the Frisians, who had been subjected to the Franks but had rebelled upon the death of Pippin. When Chilperic II died in 721, Charles appointed as his successor the son of Dagobert III, Theuderic IV, who occupied the throne from 721 to 737. Charles was now appointing the kings whom he supposedly served (rois fainéants). By the end of his reign, he did not appoint any at all. At this time, Charles again marched against the Saxons. Then the Neustrians rebelled under Raganfrid, who had left the County of Anjou. They were easily defeated in 724, but Raganfrid gave up his sons as hostages in turn for keeping his county. This ended the civil wars of Charles's reign.

The next six years were devoted to assuring Frankish authority over the neighboring political groups. Between 720 and 723, Charles was fighting in Bavaria, where the Agilolfing dukes had gradually evolved into independent rulers, recently in alliance with Liutprand the Lombard. He forced the Alemanni to accompany him, and Duke Hugbert of Bavaria submitted to Frankish suzerainty. In 725 he brought back the Agilolfing Princess Swanachild as a second wife.

In 725 and 728, he again entered Bavaria, and in 730 he marched against Lantfrid, Duke of Alemannia, who had also become independent, and killed him in battle. He forced the Alemanni to capitulate to Frankish suzerainty and did not appoint a successor to Lantfrid. Thus, southern Germany once more became part of the Frankish kingdom, as had northern Germany during the first years of the reign.

== Aquitaine and the Battle of Tours in 732 ==
In 731, after defeating the Saxons, Charles turned his attention to the rival southern realm of Aquitaine and crossed the Loire, breaking the treaty with Duke Odo. The Franks ransacked Aquitaine twice and captured Bourges, although Odo retook it. The Continuations of Fredegar allege that Odo called on assistance from the recently established emirate of al-Andalus, but there had been Arab raids into Aquitaine from the 720s onwards. Indeed, the anonymous Chronicle of 754 records a victory for Odo in 721 at the Battle of Toulouse, while the Liber Pontificalis records that Odo had killed 375,000 Saracens. It is more likely that this invasion or raid took place in revenge for Odo's support for rebel Berber leader Munnuza.

Whatever the circumstances were, it is clear that an army under the leadership of Abd al-Rahman al-Ghafiqi headed north, and after some minor engagements marched on the wealthy city of Tours. According to British medieval historian Paul Fouracre, "Their campaign should perhaps be interpreted as a long-distance raid rather than the beginning of a war". They were defeated by the army of Charles at the Battle of Tours at a location between Tours and Poitiers, in a victory described by the Continuations of Fredegar. According to historian Bernard Bachrach, the mostly mounted Arab army failed to break through the Frankish infantry. News of this battle spread and may be recorded in Bede's Ecclesiastical History (Book V, ch. 23). It is not given prominence in Arabic sources from the period. Despite his victory, Charles did not gain full control of Aquitaine, and Odo remained duke until 735.

== Wars of 732–737 ==
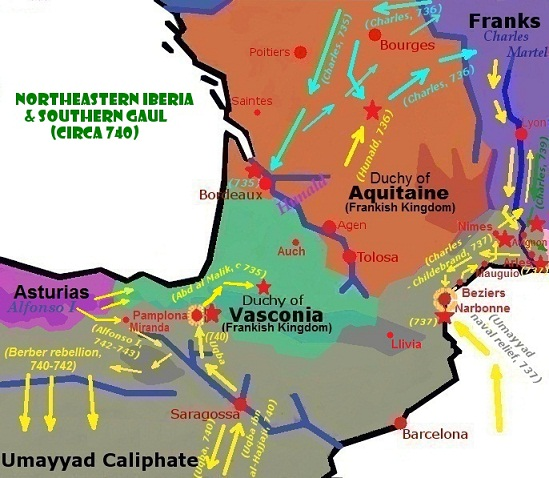
Charles's military campaigns in Aquitaine, Septimania and Provence after the Battle of Tour-Poitiers (734–742)

Between his victory of 732 and 735, Charles reorganized the kingdom of Burgundy, replacing the counts and dukes with his loyal supporters, thus strengthening his hold on power. He was forced by the ventures of Bubo, Duke of the Frisians, to invade independent-minded Frisia again. In 734 he slew Bubo at the Battle of the Boarn. Charles ordered the Frisian pagan shrines destroyed and so wholly subjugated the populace that the region was peaceful for 20 years after.

In 735 Odo died. Though Charles wished to rule the duchy directly and went there to elicit the submission of the Aquitanians, the aristocracy proclaimed Odo's son Hunald I as duke, and Charles and Hunald eventually recognised each other's position.

== Interregnum (737–741) ==
In 737 at the tail end of his campaigning in Provence and Septimania, the Merovingian King Theuderic IV died. Charles, titling himself maior domus and princeps et dux Francorum, did not appoint a new king, and nobody acclaimed one. The throne lay vacant until Charles's death. The interregnum, the final four years of Charles's life, was relatively peaceful although in 738 he compelled the Saxons of Westphalia to submit and pay tribute, and in 739 he checked an uprising in Provence where some rebels united under the leadership of Maurontus.

Charles used the relative peace to set about integrating the outlying realms of his empire into the Frankish church. He erected four dioceses in Bavaria (Salzburg, Regensburg, Freising, and Passau) and gave them Boniface as metropolitan bishop over all Germany east of the Rhine, with his seat at Mainz. Boniface had been under his protection since 723. Boniface explained to Daniel of Winchester that without it he could neither administer his church, defend his clergy, nor prevent idolatry.

In 739, Pope Gregory III sought Charles's aid against Liutprand, but Charles was loath to fight his onetime ally and ignored the plea. Nonetheless, the pope's request for Frankish protection showed how far Charles had come from the days when he was tottering on excommunication, and set the stage for his son and grandson to assert themselves in the peninsula.

== Death and transition in rule ==
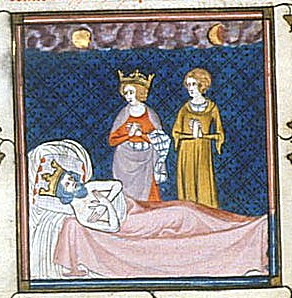
14th-century depiction of the death of Charles.

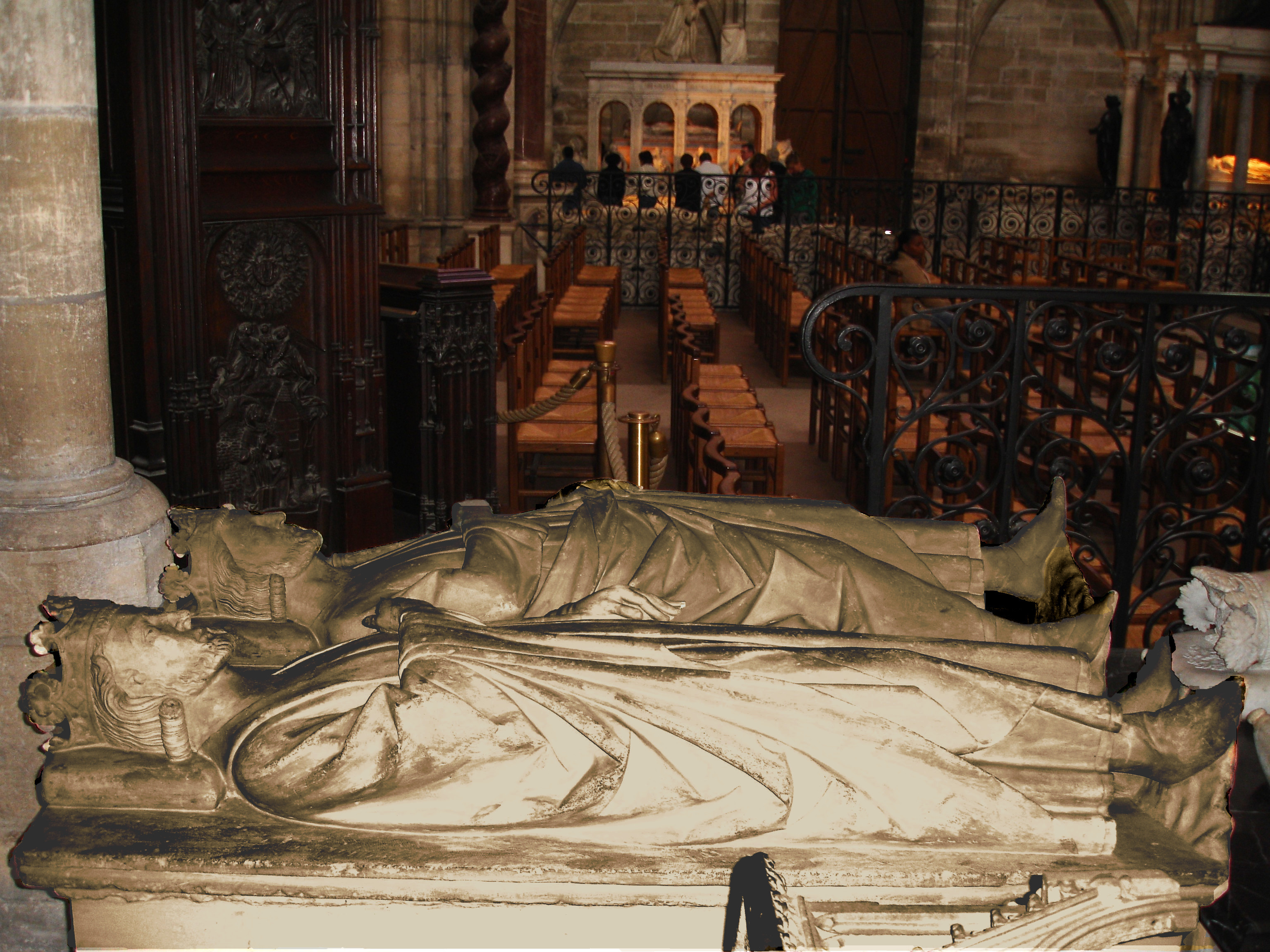
Tomb in Saint Denis Basilica.

Charles died on 22 October 741, at Quierzy-sur-Oise in what is today the Aisne département in the Picardy region of France. He was buried at Saint Denis Basilica in Paris. His territories had been divided among his adult sons a year earlier: to Carloman he gave Austrasia, Alemannia, and Thuringia, and to Pippin the Younger Neustria, Burgundy, Provence, and Metz and Trier in the "Mosel duchy". Grifo was given several lands throughout the kingdom but at a later date, just before Charles died.

== Legacy ==
Earlier in his life Charles had many internal opponents and felt the need to appoint his own kingly claimant, Chlotar IV. Later, however, the dynamics of rulership in Francia had changed, and no hallowed Merovingian ruler was required. Charles divided his realm among his sons without opposition (though he ignored his young son Bernard). For many historians, Charles laid the foundations for his son Pepin's rise to the Frankish throne in 751 and his grandson Charlemagne's imperial acclamation in 800. However, for historian Paul Fouracre, while Charles was "the most effective military leader in Francia", his career "finished on a note of unfinished business".

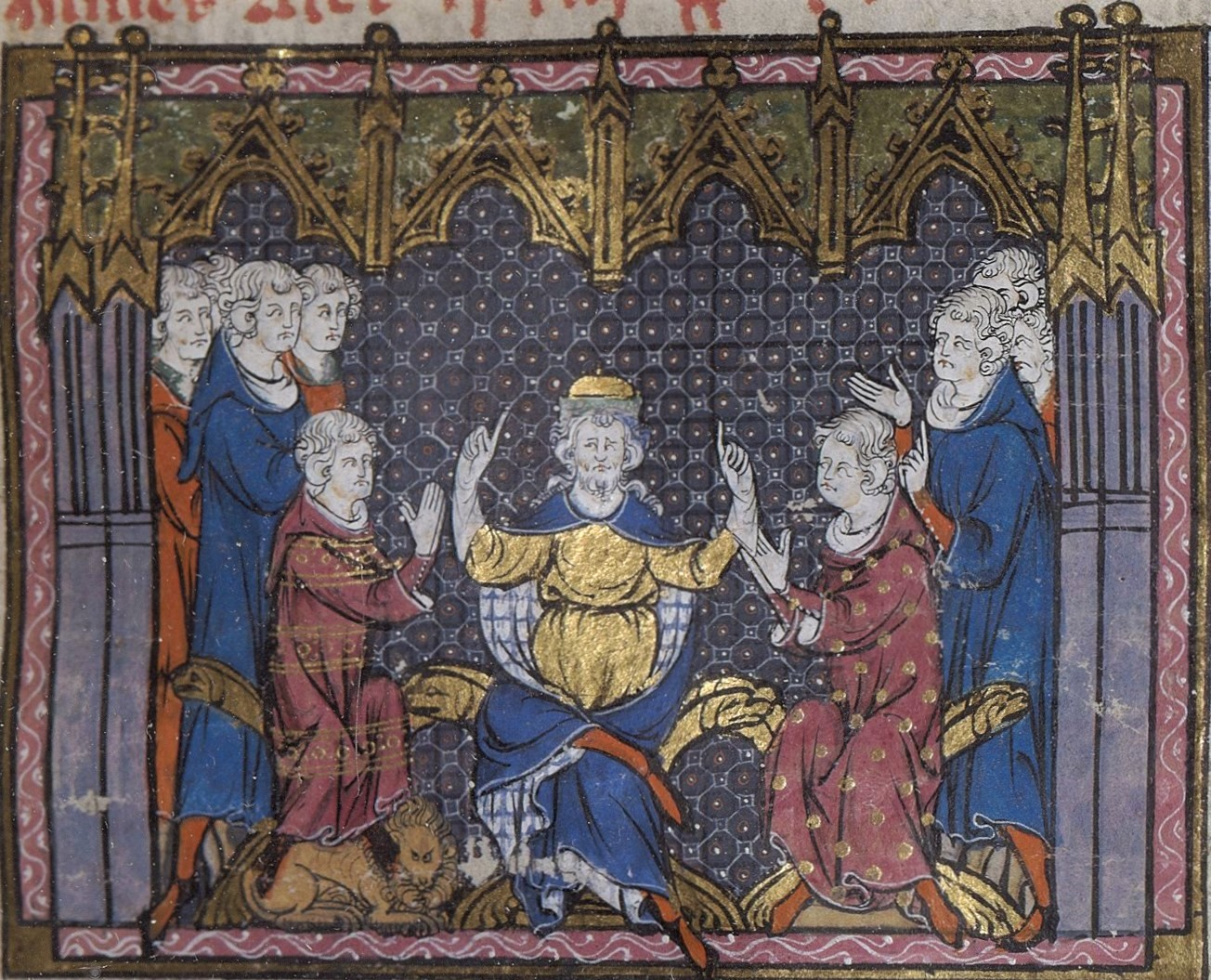
14th century depiction of Charles Martel dividing the realm between his sons, Pepin and Carloman, from the Grandes Chroniques de France – Bibliothèque nationale de France

=== Family and children ===
Charles married twice, his first wife being Rotrude of Treves, daughter either of Lambert II, Count of Hesbaye, or of Leudwinus, Count of Treves. They had the following children:

- Hiltrud
- Carloman
- Landrade, also rendered as Landres
- Auda, also rendered as Aldana
- Pepin the Younger

Most of the children married and had issue. Hiltrud married Odilo I (Duke of Bavaria). Landrade was once believed to have married a Sigrand (Count of Hesbania) but Sigrand's wife was more likely the sister of Rotrude. Auda married Theoderic, Count of Autun.

Charles also married a second time, to Swanhild and they had a child named Grifo.

With mistress Ruodhaid he had:

- Bernhard (c. 720–787)

With an unnamed mistress he had:

- Hieronymus (c. 722 – after 782),
- Remigius (c. 725–771), archbishop of Rouen.

== Reputation and historiography ==
=== Military victories ===
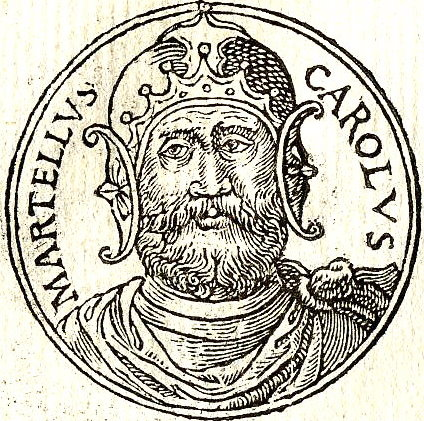
Charles depicted in Promptuarii Iconum Insigniorum by Guillaume Rouillé, published in 1553

For early medieval authors, Charles was famous for his military victories. Paul the Deacon for instance attributes a victory against the Saracens actually won by Odo of Aquitaine to Charles. However, alongside this there soon developed a darker reputation, for his alleged abuse of church property. A 9th-century text, the Visio Eucherii, possibly written by Hincmar of Reims, portrayed Charles as suffering in hell for this reason. According to Fouracre, this was "the single most important text in the construction of Charles's reputation as a seculariser or despoiler of church lands".

By the 18th century, historians such as Edward Gibbon had begun to portray the Frankish leader as the saviour of Christian Europe from a full-scale Islamic invasion. 19th century German historian Heinrich Brunner argues that Charles had confiscated church lands in order to fund military reforms that allowed him to defeat the Arab conquests, in this way brilliantly combining two traditions about the ruler. However, Fouracre argues "...there is not enough evidence to show that there was a decisive change either in the way in which the Franks fought, or in the way in which they organised the resources needed to support their warriors." Many 20th-century European historians continued to develop Gibbon's perspectives, such as French medievalist Christian Pfister, who wrote in 1911:

"Besides establishing a certain unity in Gaul, Charles saved it from a great peril. In 711 the Arabs had conquered Spain. In 720 they crossed the Pyrenees, seized Narbonensis, a dependency of the kingdom of the Visigoths, and advanced on Gaul. By his able policy Odo succeeded in arresting their progress for some years; but a new vali, Abdur Rahman, a member of an extremely fanatical sect, resumed the attack, reached Poitiers, and advanced on Tours, the holy town of Gaul. In October 732—just 100 years after the death of Mahomet—Charles gained a brilliant victory over Abdur Rahman, who was called back to Africa by revolts of the Berbers and had to give up the struggle. ...After his victory, Charles took the offensive".

Similarly, William E. Watson, who wrote of the battle's importance in Frankish and world history in 1993, suggests:

"Had Charles Martel suffered at Tours-Poitiers the fate of King Roderick at the Rio Barbate, it is doubtful that a 'do-nothing' sovereign of the Merovingian realm could have later succeeded where his talented major domus had failed. Indeed, as Charles was the progenitor of the Carolingian line of Frankish rulers and grandfather of Charlemagne, one can even say with a degree of certainty that the subsequent history of the West would have proceeded along vastly different currents had 'Abd al-Rahman been victorious at Tours-Poitiers in 732."

Political scientist Samuel Huntington sees the Battle of Tours as marking the end of the "Arab and Moorish surge west and north". Other recent historians, however, argue that the importance of the battle is dramatically overstated, both for European history in general and for Charles's reign in particular. This view is typified by Alessandro Barbero, who writes:

"Today, historians tend to play down the significance of the battle of Poitiers, pointing out that the purpose of the Arab force defeated by Charles Martel was not to conquer the Frankish kingdom, but simply to pillage the wealthy monastery of St-Martin of Tours".

Similarly, Tomaž Mastnak writes:

"The continuators of Fredegar's chronicle, who probably wrote in the mid-eighth century, pictured the battle as just one of many military encounters between Christians and Saracens—moreover, as only one in a series of wars fought by Frankish princes for booty and territory... One of Fredegar's continuators presented the battle of Poitiers as what it really was: an episode in the struggle between Christian princes as the Carolingians strove to bring Aquitaine under their rule."

More recently, the memory of Charles has been appropriated by far right and white nationalist groups, such as the 'Charles Martel Group' in France and by the perpetrator of the Christchurch mosque shootings at Al Noor Mosque and Linwood Islamic Centre in Christchurch, New Zealand, in 2019. The memory of Charles is a topic of debate in contemporary French politics on both the right and the left.

In the 17th century a legend emerged that Charles had formed the first regular order of knights in France. In 1620, Andre Favyn stated (without providing a source) that among the spoils Charles's forces captured after the Battle of Tours were many genets (raised for their fur) and several of their pelts. Charles gave these furs to leaders amongst his army, forming the first order of knighthood, the Order of the Genet. Favyn's claim was then repeated and elaborated in later works in English, for instance by Elias Ashmole in 1672 and James Coats in 1725.

Charles Martel Carolingian Dynasty Born: 676, 686, 688 or 690 Died: 741
Regnal titles
Preceded by Pepin II the Middle	Mayor of the Palace of Austrasia; 717–741	Succeeded by Carloman
Preceded by Raganfrid	Mayor of the Palace of Neustria; 717–741	Succeeded by Pepin the Younger
