= Paschasius Radbertus =

9th-century Frankish theologian and saint

Saint Paschase Radbert OSB
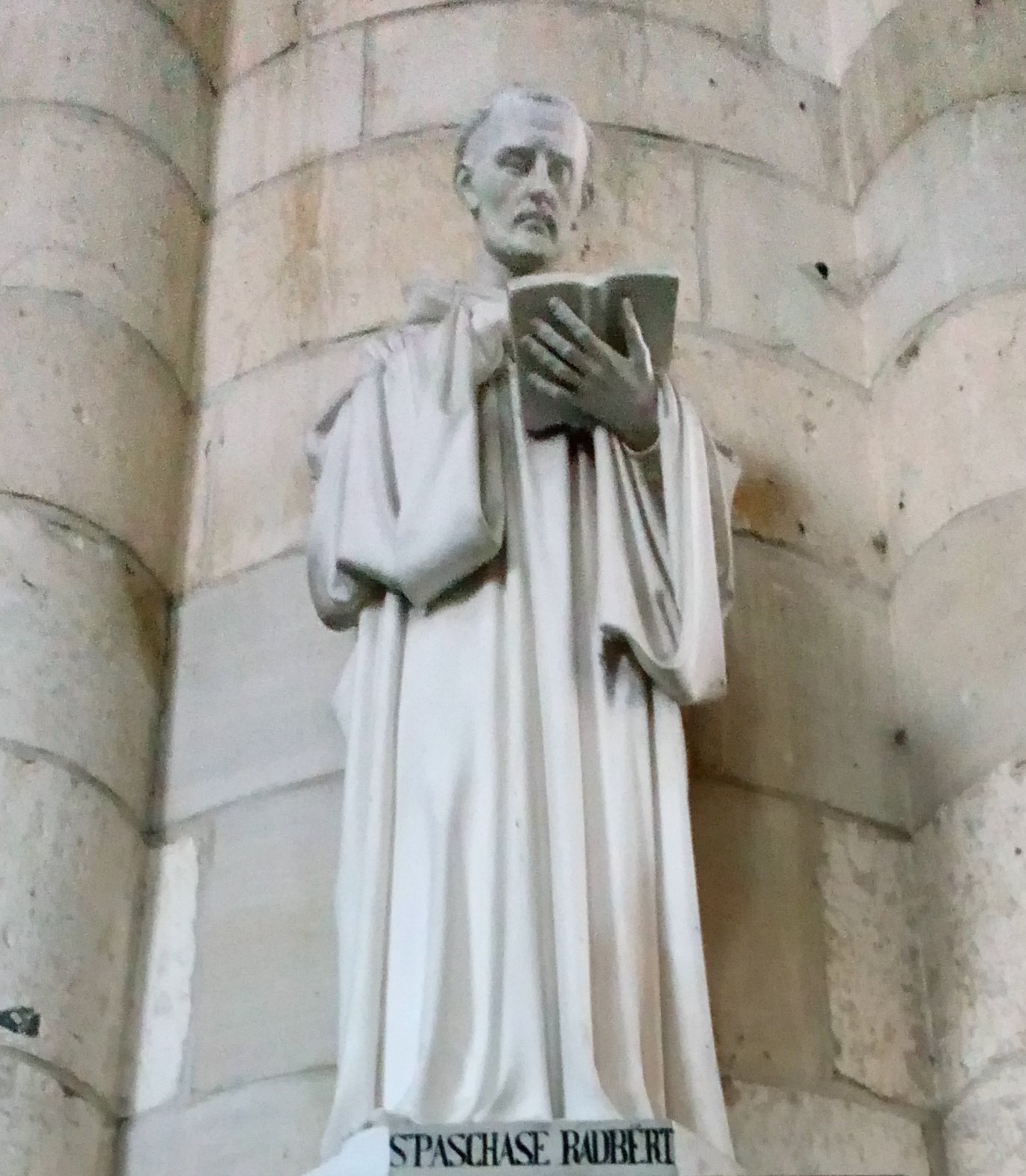
- Statue of Paschase Radbert, Abbey of Saint Peter, Corbie
- Born: 785; Soissons
- Hometown: Soissons
- Residence: Corbie Abbey
- Died: 865; Corbie Abbey
- Honored in: Catholic Church
- Canonized: 12 July 1073, Corbie by Pope Gregory VII
- Major shrine: Church of St. Peter, Corbie
- Feast: 26 April; 12 July
- Controversy: Immaculate Conception, Transubstantiation
- Major works: De Corpore et Sanguine Domini

Paschasius Radbertus (785–865) was a Carolingian theologian and the abbot of Corbie, a monastery in Picardy founded in 657 or 660 by the queen regent Bathilde with a founding community of monks from Luxeuil Abbey. His most well-known and influential work is an exposition on the nature of the Eucharist written around 831, entitled De Corpore et Sanguine Domini. He was canonized in 1073 by Pope Gregory VII. His feast day is 26 April.

His works are edited in Patrologia Latina vol. 120 (1852) and his important tract on the Eucharist and transubstantiation, De Corpore et Sanguine Domini, in a 1969 edition by B. Paulus, published by Brepols (Corpus Christianorum, Continuatio Mediaevalis 16).

== Life ==
Paschasius was an orphan left on the steps of the convent of Notre-Dame de Soissons. He was raised by the nuns there, and became very fond of the abbess, Theodrara. Theodrara was sister of Adalard of Corbie and Wala of Corbie, two monks whom he admired greatly. At a fairly young age, Paschasius left the convent to serve as a monk under Abbot Adalard, at Corbie. There he also met Wala, Adalard's brother and successor.

Through the abbotship of both Adalard and Wala, Paschasius focused on the monastic life, spending his time studying and teaching. In 822 he accompanied abbot Adalard into Saxony for the purpose of founding the monastery of New Corvey in Westphalia. When Adalard died in 826, Paschasius helped ensure Wala would become Abbot in his place. After Wala's death in 836 Heddo became abbot. Ratramnus, who may have held the position of teaching master, held opposing views to Paschasius on a number of ecclesiastical issues. Ratramnus wrote a refutation of Paschasius' treatise on the Eucharist, De Corpore et Sanguine Domini, using the same title.

In 843 Paschasius succeeded Abbot Isaac; however, he resigned his title ten years later to return to his studies. He left Corbie for the nearby monastery of Saint-Riquier, where he lived in voluntary exile for some years. Why he resigned is unknown, but it is likely that his actions were motivated by factional disputes within his monastic community; misunderstandings between himself and the younger monks were likely factors in his decision. He returned to Corbie late in life, and resided in his old monastery until his death in 865.

Paschasius' body was first buried at the Church of St. John in Corbie. After numerous reported miracles, the Pope ordered his remains to be removed, and interred in the Church of St. Peter, Corbie.

== Writings ==
=== De Corpore et Sanguine Domini ===
The most well-known and influential work of Paschasius, De Corpore et Sanguine Domini (written between 831 and 833), is an exposition on the nature of the Eucharist. It was originally written as an instructional manual for the monks under his care at Corbie, and is the first lengthy treatise on the sacrament of the Eucharist in the Western world. In it, Paschasius agrees with Ambrose in affirming that the Eucharist contains the true, historical body of Jesus Christ. According to Paschasius, God is truth itself, and therefore, his words and actions must be true. Christ's proclamation at the Last Supper that the bread and wine were his body and blood must be taken literally, since God is truth. He thus believes that the transubstantiation of the bread and wine offered in the Eucharist really occurs. Only if the Eucharist is the actual body and blood of Christ can a Christian know it is salvific.

Paschasius believed that the presence of the historical blood and body of Christ allows the partaker a real union with Jesus in a direct, personal, and physical union by joining a person's flesh with Christ's and Christ's flesh with his. To Paschasius, the Eucharist's transformation into the flesh and blood of Christ is possible because of the principle that God is truth; God is able to manipulate nature, as he created it. The book was given to Charles the Bald, the Frankish king, as a present in 844, with the inclusion of a special introduction. The view Paschasius expressed in this work was met with some hostility; Ratramnus wrote a rebuttal by the same name, by order of Charles the Bald, who did not agree with some of the views Paschasius held. Ratramnus believed that the Eucharist was strictly metaphorical; he focused more on the relationship between faith and the newly emerging science. Shortly thereafter, a third monk joined the debate, Rabanus Maurus, which initiated the Carolingian Eucharist Controversy. Ultimately, however, the king accepted Paschasius' assertion, and the substantial presence of Christ in the Eucharist became the authoritative belief in the Catholic faith.

"When I begin to think about [Adalard], I am inwardly affected by two contrary emotions, namely, grief, and joy. The Apostle forbids us to mourn in such a situation, but my and our sudden desolation prevents us from rejoicing."
Paschasius Radbertus, Vita Adalhardi

=== Vitae Adalhardi et Walae ===
Written in 826 and 836, respectively, Vita Adalhardi and Vita Walae are spiritual biographies of Paschasius' role-models. They are personal tributes, written for the memory of two fathers, and the patterns of life depicted in them are intended to be followed.

Vita Adalhardi is rather brief; it is a fairly conventional representation of a saint's life. However, the style that Paschasius uses is unique for the time in which it was written. Written in mourning for the loss of his friend, Paschasius compares Adalard to the painter Zeuxis. As described by Cicero, artists study models to perfect their art; Zeuxis' challenge was to paint the woman, Helen of Troy. Paschasius states that just as Zeuxis studied forms in order to perfect his art, so too does Adalard in trying to reform the image of God in himself. In making this comparison, Paschasius was identified with being a humanistic writer of the Carolingian period, as he compared classic and ancient literature with contemporary literature. Paschasius depicts Adalard as a mirror image of Christ, emphasizing the elements of infinite love and descent into suffering. He also parallels Adalard's role in the church to that of a mother, which is a concept attributed to Cistercian spirituality in the 12th century, three hundred years after Paschasius' death. The grief felt over the death of Adalard is extremely strong in the book – although Paschasius knows that suffering should give way to joy, as depicted by his forefathers, such as Jerome, Paschasius' grief for the loss of his friend surpassed that of his literary models. This style of writing is also not seen elsewhere prior to the 12th century. Paschasius' justification of excess mourning is his most distinctive contribution to the tradition of consolation literature.

Vita Walae is much longer (about twice as long as Vita Adalhardi), and is structured as a dialogue. In total, there are eight characters represented, presumably monks of Corbie. These characters are given pseudonyms, probably nor with the intention of masking identities. It is more likely that these pseudonyms were employed to further support Paschasius' interpretation of Wala, as the names were taken from classical texts. Phrases and passages from a variety of sources are woven into the text (Acts of St. Sebastien, The Book of Job, various comedies of Terence). Although not displaying information about Wala, these additions reflect Paschasius' own beliefs and his skill at writing. While Vita Adalhardi was written to be in part a funeral eulogy, Vita Walae was written as a (fairly) accurate depiction of Wala. Paschasius used sources in writing this biography, a handbook written by Wala, and treatises of the time, probably to show his own views through his depiction of Wala.

=== Other works ===
Paschasius has an extensive collection of works, including many exegeses on various books of the Bible. He wrote commentaries on the Gospel of Matthew, Lamentations, and an exposition of Psalm 45, which he dedicated to the nuns at St. Mary at Soissons. De Partu Virginis, written for his friend Emma, Abbess of St. Mary at Soissons and daughter of Theodrara, describes the lifestyle of nuns. He also wrote a treatise, titled De Nativitae Sanctae Mariae, regarding the nature of the Virgin Mary and the birth of Jesus Christ. Paschasius probably wrote much more, but none of it has survived through the centuries. Paschasius wrote a commentary on Revelation.

== Theological contributions ==
=== Understanding of the human body ===
In opposition to other Carolingian authors, Paschasius locates the Imago Dei (the "Image of God") in the whole human being – body as well as soul. This view is in alignment with that of the second-century Church Father Irenaeus. Irenaeus believed that Jesus was the physical embodiment of God; the son is the image of the father. As such, humans represent the image of God not only in soul, but in flesh as well. This view is in opposition to the more accepted view of Origen of Alexandria, who believed that the physical body had no part in the image-relationship. Unlike other theologians of the time, Paschasius does not equate the sanctification process with a metaphysical detachment of the body and the soul. Instead, he believes that the human condition (existing in a physical form) can contribute positively to achieving sanctification. However, he did believe in a form of mitigated dualism, in which the soul plays a larger part in the process than the body. Paschasius believes that life is an opportunity to practice for death; however, the concept that the body is a prison for the soul is practically non-existent in his work, and probably only occurs due to pressure from his peers. Even though he believed that the body has a role in one's sanctification process, he also acknowledged that flesh struggles against God, and thus has the ability to be corrupted.

=== Understanding of Christ's body ===
Paschasius believed in a distinction between veritas (truth) and figura (form, or appearance). Christ's descent from heaven to earth was a declension from truth to appearance, from the realm of perfection to the realm of imperfection. This would imply that Jesus in flesh is false, and imperfect; however, Paschasius asserted that not every figure is false. Christ is simultaneously both truth and figure because his external, physical self is the figure of the truth, the physical manifestation of the truth that exists in the soul. The person that was Jesus was subject to human needs, just like the rest of humanity. He required to eat, to sleep, and to be in company with others. In addition to this, however, he also performed miracles. These behaviours which Jesus exhibited imply a duality in the concept of "Word made flesh". Miracles, until then only performed by God, the non-physical Truth or Word, were suddenly performed by a physical human being. The relationship between Jesus' humanity and his divinity is rather convoluted; however, it is analogous to the relation of figures (written letters) of words to their spoken counterparts. Therefore, Jesus in physical form is the visual representation, T-R-U-T-H, while his divinity is the spoken sound of those written letters together as a word.

== Veneration ==
Paschasius is venerated in Catholicism, and commemorated on the following dates:

- 2 January – commemoration in Benedictine Order calendar,
- 26 April – main date, (death anniversary),
- 12 July – canonization and translation of relics (1073).

== See also ==
- Adalard of Corbie
- Wala of Corbie
- Ratramnus of Corbie
- Charles the Bald
- Rabanus Maurus
