= Corbie Abbey =

French monastery

Coordinates: 49°54′32″N 2°30′37″E

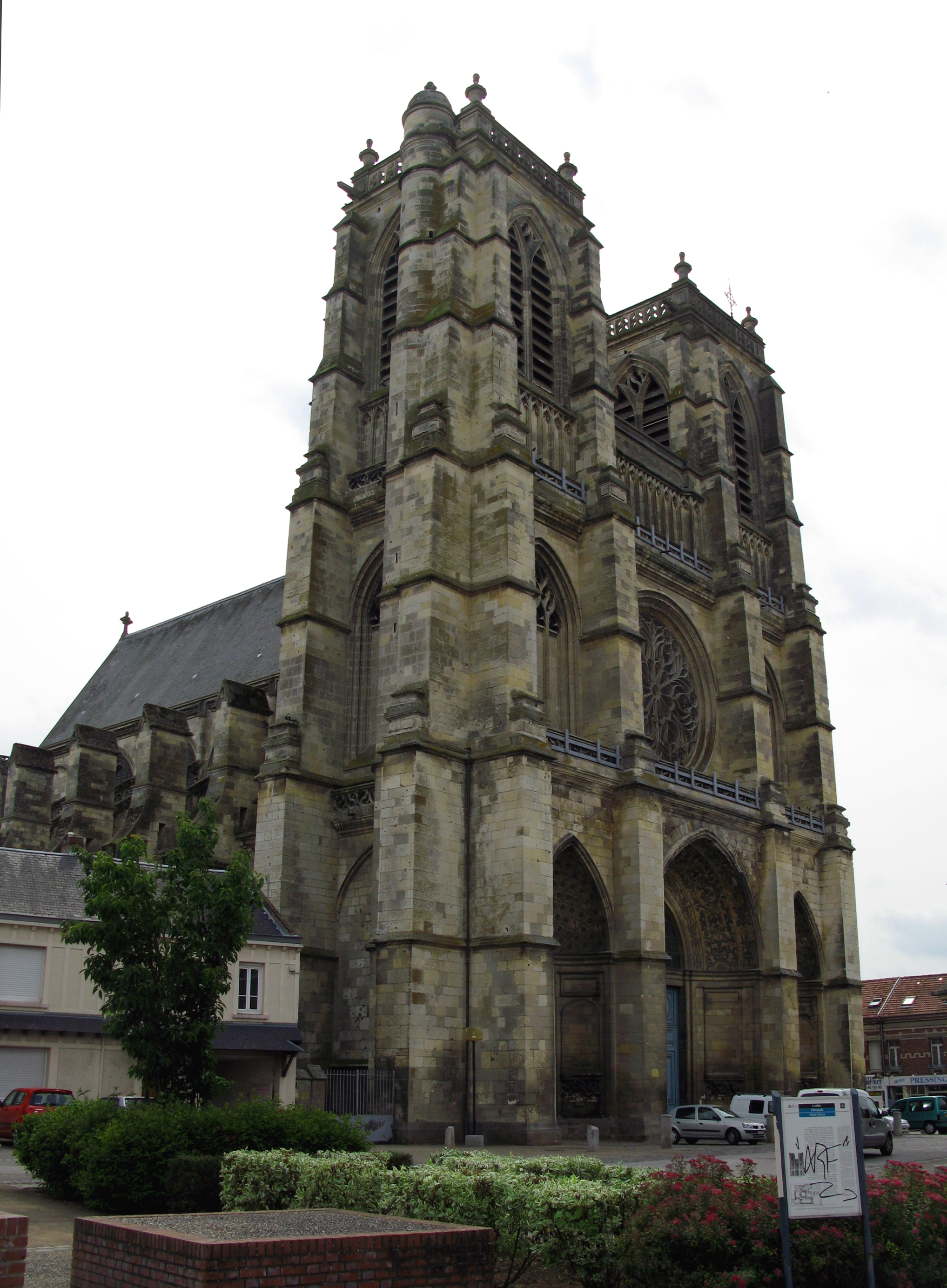
Abbey church of Corbie.

Corbie Abbey is a former Benedictine monastery in Corbie, in present-day Picardy, France, dedicated to Saint Peter. It was founded by Balthild, the widow of Clovis II, who had monks sent from Luxeuil. The Abbey of Corbie became celebrated both for its library and the scriptorium.

== Foundation ==
It was founded in 661 under the Merovingian royal patronage of Balthild, widow of Clovis II, and her son Clotaire III. The first monks came from Luxeuil Abbey, which had been founded by Saint Columbanus in 590, and the Irish respect for classical learning fostered there was carried forward at Corbie. Theodefrid was the first abbot. The rule of the founders was based on the Benedictine rule, as Columbanus had modified it.

Its scriptorium came to be one of the centres of work of manuscript illumination when the art was still fairly new in western Europe. The clear and legible hand known as Carolingian minuscule was also developed at the scriptorium at Corbie, as well as a distinctive style of illumination. In this early Merovingian period, the work of Corbie was innovative in that it showed pictures of people; for example, Saint Jerome. Dr. Tino Licht of Heidelberg University discovered in 2012 a manuscript from Corbie Abbey written in the Caroline minuscule that predates Charlemagne's rule. According to Dr. Licht, "They were trying it out. In the Middle Ages a script like this ...was developed as part of the living tradition of a scriptorium. In the 8th century Corbie was something akin to a laboratory for new scripts."

Besides gifts of estates to support the abbey, many exemptions were granted to the abbots, to free them from interference from local bishops: the exemptions were confirmed in 855 by Pope Benedict III. The abbots ranked as counts and had the privilege of a mint.

== Medieval period ==
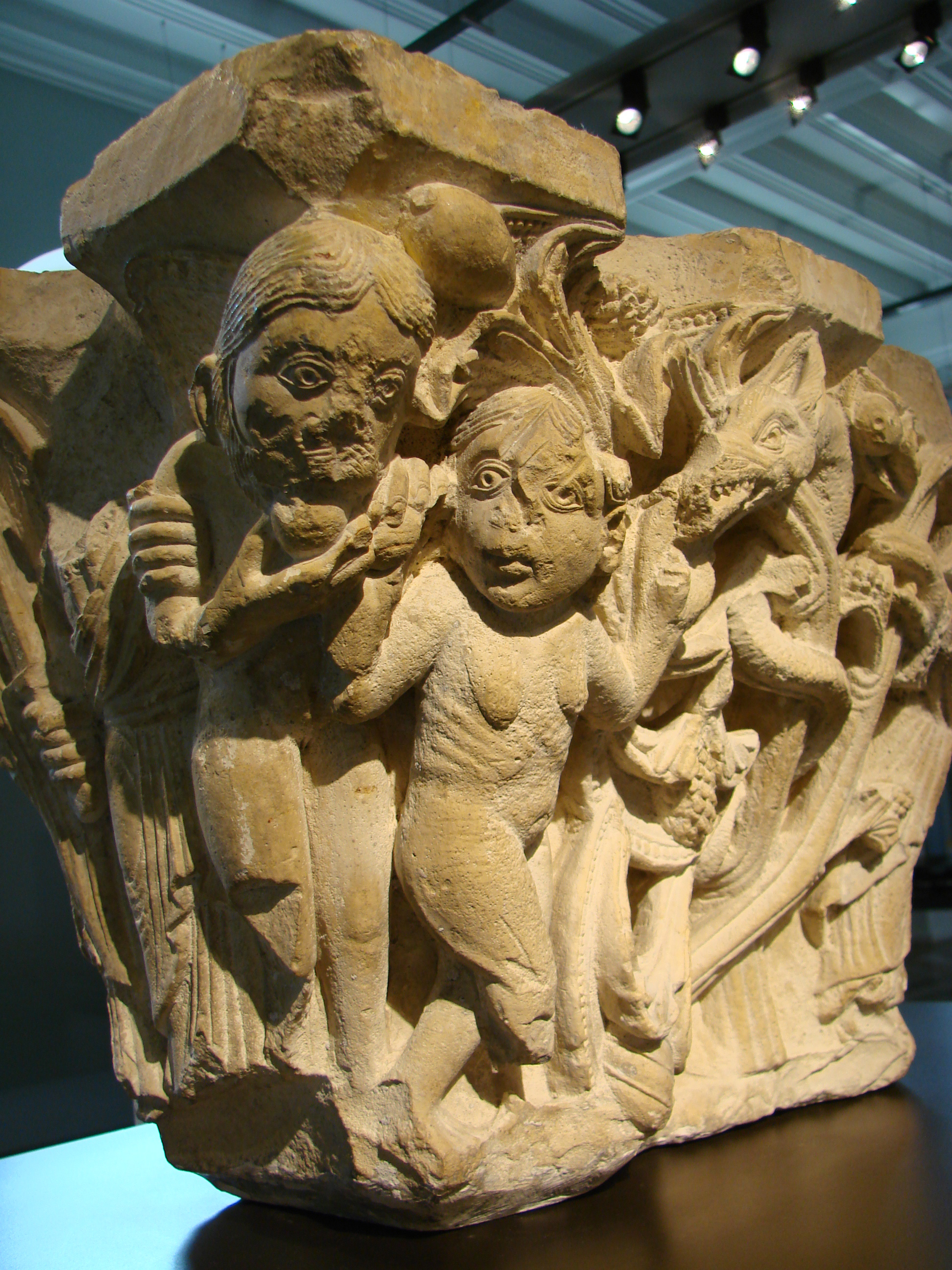
Adam and Eve on a late 12th century capital from the abbey (Musée de Picardie, Amiens)

Corbie continued its intimate links with the royal house of the Carolingians. In 774 Desiderius, last King of the Lombards, was exiled here after his defeat by Charlemagne. From 850 to 854 Charles, the future Archbishop of Mainz, was confined here. Members of the Carolingian house sometimes served as abbots; the ninth abbot was Saint Adalard, one of Charlemagne's cousins. Under Adalard, the monastic school of Corbie attained great celebrity, and about the same time it sent forth a colony to found the Abbey of Corvey in Saxony. In the ninth century Corbie was larger than St. Martin's Abbey at Tours, or Saint Denis at Paris. At its height, it housed 300 monks. Three of Corbie's scholars were Ratramnus (died c. 868), Radbertus Paschasius (died 865) and Hadoard.

Saint Gerald of Sauve-Majeure was born in Corbie and became a child oblate at the Abbey, where he then became a monk and served as cellarer. He later went on to found Grande-Sauve Abbey.

In 1137 a fire destroyed the monastic buildings but they were rebuilt on a larger scale. Saint Colette of Corbie's father worked as a carpenter at the Abbey. After her parents died, in 1402 she joined the Third Order of St. Francis, and became a hermit under the direction of the Abbot of Corbie, and lived near the abbey church. She later founded the Colettine Poor Clares.

Commendatory abbots were introduced in 1550, amongst those that held the benefice was Cardinal Mazarin. The somewhat drooping fortunes of the abbey were revived in 1618, when it was one of the first to be incorporated into the new Congregation of Saint Maur. At its suppression in 1790 the buildings were partly demolished, but the church remains to this day, with its imposing portal and western towers.

=== Library ===
Corbie was renowned for its library, which was assembled from as far as Italy, and for its scriptorium. The contents of its library are known from catalogues of the eleventh and twelfth centuries. In addition to its patristic writings, it is recognized as an important center for the transmission of the works of Antiquity to the Middle Ages. An inventory (of perhaps the 11th century) lists the church history of Hegesippus, now lost, among other extraordinary treasures.

Among students of Tertullian, the library is of interest as it contained a number of unique copies of Tertullian's works, the so-called corpus Corbiense and included some of his unorthodox Montanist treatises, as well as two works by Novatian issued pseudepigraphically under Tertullian's name. The origin of this group of non-orthodox texts has not been identified satisfactorily.

Among students of medieval architecture and engineering, such as are preserved in the notebooks of Villard de Honnecourt, Corbie is of interest as the center of renewed interest in geometry and surveying techniques, both theoretical and practical, as they had been transmitted from Euclid through the Geometria of Boethius and works by Cassiodorus (Zenner).

In 1638, Cardinal Richelieu ordered the transfer of 400 manuscripts to the library of the monastery of Saint-Germain-des-Prés in Paris. During the French Revolution, the library was closed and the last of the monks dispersed: 300 manuscripts still at Corbie were moved to Amiens, 15 km to the west. Those at St-Germain des Prés were released on the market, and many rare manuscripts were obtained by Russian diplomat Peter P. Dubrovsky and sent to St. Petersburg. Other Corbie manuscripts are at the Bibliothèque Nationale. Over two hundred manuscripts from the great library at Corbie are known to survive.

== Modern times ==
Jean Mabillon, the father of paleography, had been a monk at Corbie. The village of Corbie grew up round Corbie Abbey and was close to the fighting during the Battle of the Somme. Between 22 April and 10 May 1918, Corbie was heavily shelled by the Germans and the church sustained many direct hits.

== Burials ==
- Radbertus Paschasius
- Saint Martin of Arades (died 726)
- Desiderius (died here)

== List of abbots ==
This list is drawn from the Dictionnaire d'Histoire et de Géographie Ecclesiastique.

Regular abbots

- 662–675 : Theofrid
- 675–6?? : Chrodogar
- 6??–716 : Erembert
- 716–741 : Sebastian I
- 741–751 : Grimo
- 751–765 : Leodegar
- 765–770 : Hado
- 771–780 : Maurdramnus
- 780–824 : Adalard
- 824–836 : Wala
- 836–840 : Heddo
- 840–843 : Isaac
- 843–851 : Paschasius Radbertus
- 851–860 : Odo
- 860–862 : Angelbert
- 862–875 : Trasulphe
- 875–884 : Hildebert
- 884–890 : Gonthaire
- 890–891 : Heilo
- 891–893 : Franco of Amiens
- 893–914 : Evrard
- 914–929 : Bodon
- 929–937 : Gautier I
- 937–03/09/945 : Bérenger
- 03/09/945–??/11/945 : Héribald
- ??/11/945–986 : Ratold
- 986–1014 : Maingaud
- 1014–1033 : Herbert
- 1033–1048 : Richard
- 1048–1097 : Fulk I, "the Great"
- 1097–1123 : Nicolas I
- 1123–1142 : Robert
- 1142–1158 : Nicolas de Moreuil
- 1158–1172 : Jean I de Bouzencourt
- 1172–1185 : Hugues I de Pérone
- 1185–1187 : Josse
- 1187–1193 : Nicolas III de Rouais
- 1193–1196 : Gérard
- 1196–1198 : Jean II de Brustin
- 1198–1201 : Foulques II de Fouilloy
- 1201–1209 : Gautier II
- 1209–1221 : Jean III de Cornillon
- 1221–1240 : Hugues II
- 1240–1254 : Raoul I
- 1254–1261 : Jean IV de Fontaines
- 1261–1269 : Pierre I de Mouret
- 1269–1287 : Hugues III de Vers
- 1287–1315 : Garnier de Bouraine
- 1315–1324 : Henri I de Villers
- 1324–1351 : Hugues IV de Vers
- 1351–1363 : Jean V d'Arcy
- 1363–1395 : Jean VI de Goye
- 1395–1418 : Raoul II de Roye
- 1418–1439 : Jean VII de Lion
- 1439–1445 : Jean VIII de Bersée
- 1445–1461 : Michel de Dauffiné
- 1461–1475 : Jacques de Ranson
- 1475–1479 : Jean IX Dansquennes
- 1479–1483 : François I de Maillers
- 1483–1485 : vacancy
- 1485–1506 : Pierre II d'Ottreil
- 1506–1522 : Guillaume III de Caurel

Commendatory abbots

- 1522–1550 : Cardinal Philippe I de La Chambre
- 1550–1556 : Sébastien II de La Chambre
- 1556–1558 : Cardinal Louis de Bourbon-Vendôme
- 1558–1580 : cardinal Charles de Bourbon
- 1580–1603 : cardinal Louis II de Lorraine
- 1603–1623 : cardinal Louis III de Lorraine
- 1623–1643 : Henri II de Lorraine-Guise
- 1643–1645 : cardinal Jules Mazarin
- 1645–1647 : Camille Pamphili
- 1647–1661 : cardinal Jules Mazarin (again)
- 1661–1669 : Vacance
- 1669–1693 : Philippe II de Savoie-Carignan
- 1693–1713 : cardinal Toussaint de Forbin-Janson
- 1713–1742 : cardinal Melchior de Polignac
- 1742–1755 : Jean-François Boyer
- 1755–1788 : cardinal Paul de Luynes
- 1788–1792 : cardinal Étienne-Charles de Loménie de Brienne

== See also ==
- Merovingian script
