= Adelaide of Tours =

Countess of Anjou and Blois (c. 820 – c. 866)

- Born: c. 820
- Died: c. 866
- Spouse: Conrad the Elder, Count of Argengau
- Issue: Hugh the Abbot; Conrad the Younger; (probably) Welf I
- House: Etichonids
- Father: Hugh of Tours
- Mother: Ava

Adelaide of Tours (Adélaïde, c. 820 – c. 866) was a prominent noblewoman in the Carolingian Empire and daughter of count Hugh of Tours and Ava, who was the sister of count Matfrid of Orléans.

She married an East Frankish nobleman Conrad the Elder, Count of Argengau (d. after 862), from the Elder House of Welf. The wedding took place sometime between 834 and 838, and Adelaide's dowry brought Conrad various estates in the West Frankish region of Auxerre. Adelaide and Conrad had at least two sons, Hugh the Abbot (d. 886) and Conrad the Younger. Later traditions of the Swabian branch of the House of Welf assign to Conrad and Adelaide an additional son, Welf I.

== Family ==
Adelaide was married to Conrad the Elder, Count of Argengau and had the following children:

- Conrad the Younger (II), who became Count of Auxerre and Lord of Transjuran Burgundy.
- Hugh the Abbot, who became the Abbot of Saint-Germain d'Auxerre.
- (uncertain) Welf I, who was count of Alpgau and Linzgau in Swabia.

Some researchers have suggested that after her husband's death Adelaide married again, to Robert the Strong (d. 866), and had two children, Odo of France and Robert I of France. Those suggestions were not universally acknowledged in scholarly literature, since it was shown that they were based on some misunderstandings in the Chronicle of St-Bénigne, and Liber memorialis of Remiremont.

== Sources ==
- Bouchard, Constance B. (1981). "The Origins of the French Nobility: A Reassessment". The American Historical Review. 86 (3): 501–532.
- Bouchard, Constance B. (1999). "Burgundy and Provence, 879–1032". The New Cambridge Medieval History. Vol. 3. Cambridge: Cambridge University Press. pp. 328–345.
- Bouchard, Constance B. (2001). Those of My Blood: Creating Noble Families in Medieval Francia. Philadelphia: University of Pennsylvania Press.
- Bradbury, Jim (2007). The Capetians: Kings of France, 987-1328. London: Continuum Books.
- Heidecker, Karl (2010). The Divorce of Lothar II: Christian Marriage and Political Power in the Carolingian World. Ithaca and London: Cornell University Press.
- Jackman, Donald C. (2008). Comparative Accuracy. State College, PA: Editions Endlaplage.
- Nelson, Janet L. (1991). The Annals of St-Bertin. Manchester: Manchester University Press.
- Nelson, Janet L. (1992). Charles the Bald. London and New York: Longman.
- Nelson, Janet L. (1996). The Frankish World, 750-900. London: The Hambledon Press.
- Reuter, Timothy (1992). The Annals of Fulda. Manchester: Manchester University Press.
- Riché, Pierre (1993). The Carolingians: A Family Who Forged Europe. Philadelphia: University of Pennsylvania Press.
