= Hugh the Abbot =

Abbot of Saint-Germain d'Auxerre

Carolingian kingdoms, after 863

Hugh the Abbot of Auxerre (died 12 May 886) was a prominent nobleman and prelate in the Carolingian Empire, who held several ecclesiastical and administrative posts in the West Frankish Kingdom during the reigns of king Charles the Bald and his successors. He was a member of the Elder House of Welf, and a son of Conrad the Elder, Count of Argengau and countess Adelaide of Tours. His brother Conrad the Younger was Count of Auxerre and Lord of Transjuran Burgundy. Hugh's paternal aunts were: empress Judith (second wife of emperor Louis the Pious), and queen Emma (wife of king Louis the German of East Francia).

== Life ==
Carolingian kingdoms, after the Treaty of Meerssen (870)

In 853-858, Hugh and his brother Conrad left East Francia, and went over to king Charles the Bald of West Francia, who was a son of their paternal aunt, empress Judith. Hugh entered the monastery and rose to become abbot of Saint-Germain d'Auxerre. Despite his vows, he was not a contemplative monk, but rather the epitome of a warrior-monk of those times. King Charles the Bald (843-877) sent him on a military expedition to the Nivernais. Hugh welcomed Charles when the king had to flee during an 858 invasion of king Louis the German, when his vassals refused him aid and rebelled under Robert the Strong, the margrave of Neustria. When Robert regained favour, Hugh was exiled to Lotharingia in the Middle Francia, where he became archbishop of Cologne (864). However, he was soon called back to the West Francia.

In 866, upon Robert's death, Hugh received all the former's abbacies, including Noirmoutiers and Saint-Martin de Tours. He was also appointed to administer several counties, including Tours, and the margraviate between the Seine and the Loire (Neustria).

Some scholars have suggested that after the death of her husband Conrad, Hugh's mother Adelaide remarried to Robert the Strong, and thus became mother to Robert's sons, Odo and Robert. Based on those assumptions, it was also suggested that after Robert's death in 866, Hugh became the regent and guardian for his young half-brothers. Those suggestions were not universally acknowledged in scholarly literature, since it was shown that assumptions on Adelaide marrying Robert were based on some misunderstandings in the Chronicle of St-Bénigne, and Liber memorialis of the Remiremont Abbey.

Hugh was endued with great political sense and fought the Vikings vigorously. He was the archchaplain of the royal court and one of the chief ministers of the joint-kings Louis III (879-882) and Carloman (879-884).

Hugh tried to maintain the alliance of the related Carolingian monarchs against the Vikings. He was instrumental in initiating a united response of all Carolingian rulers against the usurper Boso of Provence. He supported Charles the Fat on his succession to the throne of West Francia in 884, but he died before he could lend aid to the defence of Paris during the siege of 885–86.

== Sources ==
- Bouchard, Constance B. (1981). "The Origins of the French Nobility: A Reassessment". The American Historical Review. 86 (3): 501–532.
- Bouchard, Constance B. (1999). "Burgundy and Provence, 879–1032". The New Cambridge Medieval History. Vol. 3. Cambridge: Cambridge University Press. pp. 328–345.
- Bouchard, Constance B. (2001). Those of My Blood: Creating Noble Families in Medieval Francia. Philadelphia: University of Pennsylvania Press.
- Bradbury, Jim (2007). The Capetians: Kings of France, 987-1328. London: Continuum Books.
- Heidecker, Karl (2010). The Divorce of Lothar II: Christian Marriage and Political Power in the Carolingian World. Ithaca and London: Cornell University Press.
- Jackman, Donald C. (2008). Comparative Accuracy. State College, PA: Editions Endlaplage.
- MacLean, Simon (2003). Kingship and Politics in the Late Ninth Century: Charles the Fat and the end of the Carolingian Empire. New York: Cambridge University Press.
- Nelson, Janet L. (1991). The Annals of St-Bertin. Manchester: Manchester University Press.
- Nelson, Janet L. (1992). Charles the Bald. London and New York: Longman.
- Nelson, Janet L. (1996). The Frankish World, 750-900. London: The Hambledon Press.
- Reuter, Timothy (1992). The Annals of Fulda. Manchester: Manchester University Press.
- Riché, Pierre (1993). The Carolingians: A Family Who Forged Europe. Philadelphia: University of Pennsylvania Press.

| Preceded by Gunther | Archbishop of Cologne; 864 | Succeeded by Wilbert (from 870) |
