= Robert the Strong =

Frankish noble

- Count of Worms; Count of Orléans; Count of Anjou; Count of Tours; Count of Blois
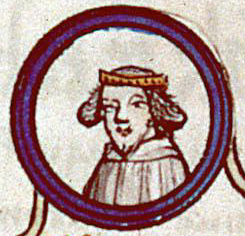
- Robert the Strong's image in a genealogy of French kings (c. 1384)

Count of Worms, Orléans, Anjou, Tours, and Blois
- Tenure: In Worms: c. 836/837 – c. 852/853; In Orléans: c. 861 – 2 July 866; In Anjou: c. 862 – 2 July 866; In Tours: 851 – 2 July 866; In Blois: 834 – 2 July 866
- Predecessor: Guntram (in Worms); William (in Orléans); Title established (in Anjou); Vivian (in Tours); William of Blois (in Blois)
- Successor: Odo
- Born: c. 830; Worms, Carolingian Empire
- Died: 2 July 866 (aged 35–36); Battle of Brissarthe
- Noble family: Robertians
- Spouses: N. sister of count Adalhelm, possibly Emma, or Adelaide of Tours
- Issue: Odo (or Eudes); Robert I of France
- Father: Robert III of Worms (most probably)
- Mother: Waldrada of Worms (most probably)

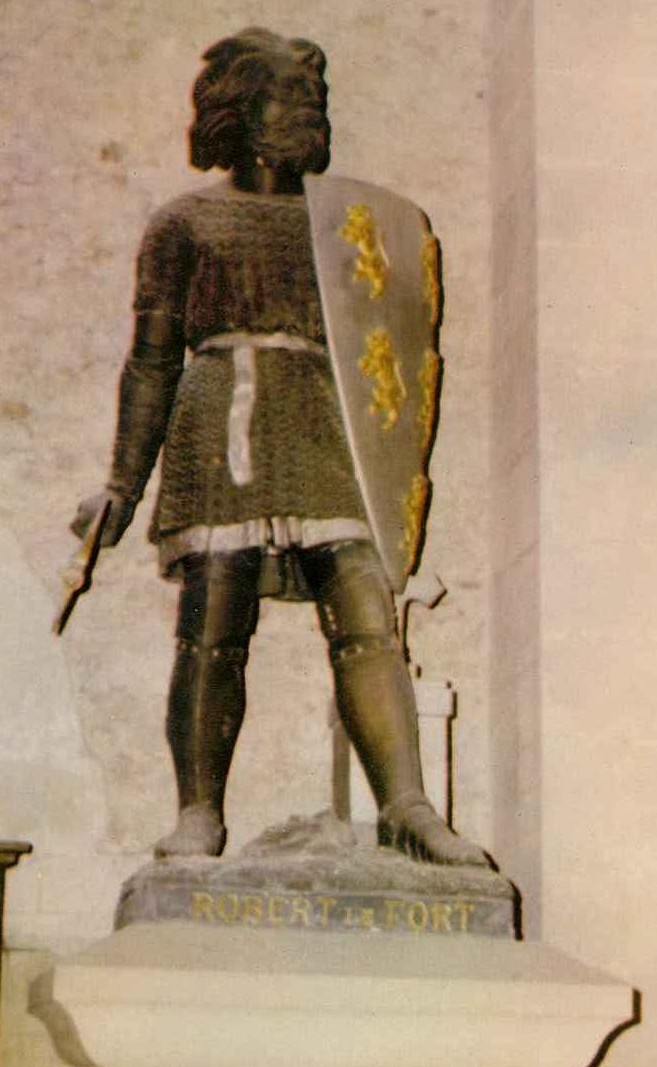
Robert the Strong's statue, located in the church of Notre Dame of Brissarthe

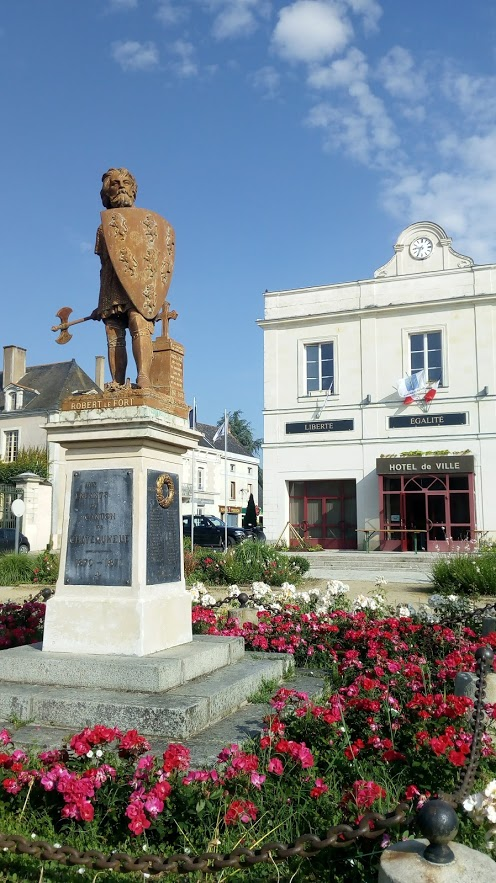
Statue of Robert the Strong, Châteauneuf-sur-Sarthe

Robert the Strong (French: Robert le Fort; c. 830 – 866) was the father of two kings of West Francia: Odo (or Eudes) and Robert I of France. His family is named after him and called the Robertians. In 853, he was named missus dominicus by Charles the Bald, King of West Francia. Robert the Strong was the great-grandfather of Hugh Capet and thus the ancestor of all the Capetians.

== Origins and rise to power ==
The parentage of Robert the Strong is obscure. While very little is known about the beginnings of the Robertian family, speculative proposals have been made. According to one proposal, Robert was a son of Robert III of Worms. Far more speculatively, mainly based on the use of the name Robert, or similar names, it has been proposed for example that his family had its origins in the Hesbaye region in present-day eastern Belgium, or perhaps descended from the family of Chrodegang of Metz. However, these proposals are unproven.

According to the Worms proposal, during the reign of Louis the German in East Francia, the Robertian family emigrated from East Francia to West Francia. After their arrival in his realm Charles the Bald rewarded the family defecting from his enemy by assigning to Robert the lay abbacy of Marmoutier in 852.

In 853, king Charles granted the position of missus dominicus in the provinces of Maine, Anjou, and Touraine to Robert, giving him de facto control of the ancient ducatus Cenomannicus, a large duchy centred on Le Mans and corresponding to the ancient realm of regnum Neustriae. Robert's rise came at the expense of the established family of the Rorigonids and was designed to curb their regional power and to defend Neustria from Viking and Breton raids.

== Revolt ==
In 858 Robert joined a rebellion against Charles the Bald. With the Bretons under Salomon he led the Frankish nobles of Neustria and invited Louis the German to invade West Francia and receive their homage. The revolt had been sparked by a marriage alliance between Charles and Erispoe, King of Brittany, and by the investment of Charles' son, Louis the Stammerer, with the regnum Neustriae, all which significantly curtailed the powers of both Salomon and Robert. Charles had given Robert the counties of Autun and Nevers in Burgundy; and in 856 Robert had defended Autun from Louis the German. But following Erispoe's assassination in November 857, he and Salomon rebelled against Charles.

Robert's Neustrians chased Louis the Stammerer from Le Mans in 858. Later that year, Louis the German reached Orléans and received delegations from the Breton and Neustrian leaders, as well as from Pepin II of Aquitaine. In 861, Charles made peace with Robert and appointed him Count of Anjou. Thereafter, Robert successfully defended the northern coast against a Viking invasion.

In 862 Charles granted Louis the Stammerer, his son, the lay abbacy of Saint Martin of Tours—a worthy benefice but small in comparison with the kingdom he had received in 856, and lost in 858. The young Louis rebelled and, befriended by Salomon who supplied him with troops, mounted war against Robert.

In 862 two Viking fleets converged on Brittany; one had recently been forced out of the Seine by Charles the Bald, the other was returning from a Mediterranean expedition. Salomon hired the Mediterranean fleet to ravage the Loire valley in Neustria. Robert captured twelve of their ships, killing all on board save a few who fled. He then hired the former Seine Vikings to attack Salomon's realm for 6,000 pounds silver.

Robert's apparent purpose was to prevent the Vikings from serving Salomon. (Note: Robert probably expected Salomon to hire them to replace the defeated Mediterranean Vikings, then to attack Neustria from two sides: with the Viking ships ascending the Loire and Breton troops invading by land.) He presumably collected a large amount in taxes for a (non-tributary) Danegeld to pay for keeping the Vikings out of Neustria. (Note: In 860–61 Charles the Bald had collected a general tax to pay a Danegeld of 5,000 pounds. The king had probably authorised Robert's payment.) But peace between the Franks and the Vikings did not last long: in 863 Salomon made his peace, but the Vikings, now deprived of enemy lands to loot, proceeded to ravage Neustria. Charles now made Robert Lay abbot of the influential abbey St. Martin at Tours.

Robert warred with Pepin II in his later years. In 863 he again defended Autun from Louis the German; he campaigned in Neustria in 865 and again in 866, shortly before his death, dealing with Bretons and Vikings ravaging the environs of Le Mans.

== Death and legacy ==
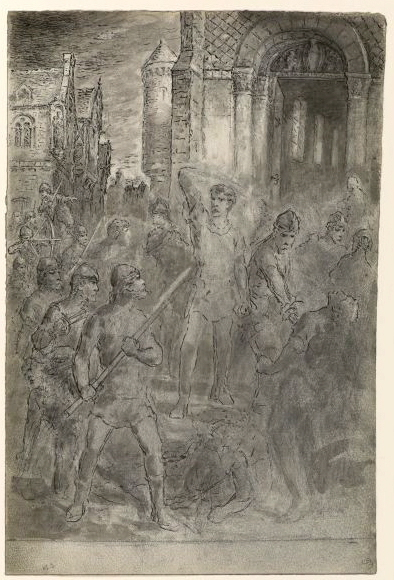
"Robert the Strong at the Battle of Brissarthe" (Jules Cesbron-Lavau, c. 1914)

On 2 July 866, Robert was killed at the Battle of Brissarthe while defending Francia against a joint Breton-Viking raiding party led by Salomon, King of Brittany and the Viking chieftain Hastein. During the battle the Viking commander was entrapped in a nearby church. Robert removed his armour to start to besiege the church; the Vikings then launched a surprise attack and Robert died in the subsequent melee. He left behind a nine-year-old son, Odo (who would later be King of France), as his heir. His heroic successes against the Vikings led to his characterization as "a second Maccabaeus" in the Annales Fuldenses.

== Family ==
Regarding the number of Robert's marriages, and identities of his spouses, several solutions have been proposed in scholarly literature.

Chronicler Regino of Prüm (d. 915) stated that maternal uncle (Latin: avunculus) of Robert's son Odo was count Adalhelm. If taken literally, Regino's statement would mean that Odo's mother and Roberts wife was a sister of Adalhelm, but some researchers have proposed alternative genealogical solutions, suggesting that Adalhelm was Odo's paternal uncle, and thus Robert's brother, rather than brother-in-law, while others have suggested that Adalhelm was married to Robert's sister, rather than the other way around.

Some scholars have also proposed that Robert (b. around 830) was during his last years of life (d. 866) married to Adelaide of Tours, who was a decade older (b. around 820), and married (since late 830s) to Conrad the Elder, Count of Argengau (d. after 862). Since Robert's son Odo became Count of Paris in 882, proving himself as an able military leader and thus at least in his twenties, it is assumed that Robert was already married during 850s. That would exclude the possibility of Adelaide being Odo's mother and Robert's wife at that time. Robert's younger son and namesake Robert was born c. 866, when Adelaide was already in her late forties. Attempting to resolve the question of Adelaide ever being married to Robert, some researchers have pointed out that their assumed marriage was in fact based on some misunderstandings in the Chronicle of St-Bénigne.

Based on the new interpretation of data from the Liber memorialis of the Remiremont Abbey, some researchers have suggested that later entries on certain Robert and Adelaide from 907 are in fact referring to Robert's son - then count and future king Robert (d. 923) and his first wife Adelaide, and it was also suggested that the name of Robert's wife might have been Emma.

From one or two wives, Robert had at least two sons:

- Odo of France (c.857–898), King of West Francia (888–898).
- Robert I of France (c.866–923), King of West Francia (922–923).

== Sources ==
- Bouchard, Constance B. (1981). "The Origins of the French Nobility: A Reassessment". The American Historical Review. 86 (3): 501–532.
- Bouchard, Constance B. (2001). Those of My Blood: Creating Noble Families in Medieval Francia. Philadelphia: University of Pennsylvania Press.
- Bouchard, Constance B. (2014). Rewriting Saints and Ancestors: Memory and Forgetting in France, 500–1200. Philadelphia: University of Pennsylvania Press.
- Bradbury, Jim (2007). The Capetians: Kings of France, 987-1328. London: Continuum Books.
- Jackman, Donald C. (2008). Comparative Accuracy. State College, PA: Editions Endlaplage.
- Kurze, Fridericus, ed. (1890). Reginonis abbatis Prumiensis Chronicon cum continuatione Treverensi. Hannoverae: Impensis Bibliopolii Hahniani.
- MacLean, Simon (2003). Kingship and Politics in the Late Ninth Century: Charles the Fat and the end of the Carolingian Empire. New York: Cambridge University Press.
- MacLean, Simon (2009). History and Politics in Late Carolingian and Ottonian Europe: The Chronicle of Regino of Prüm and Adalbert of Magdeburg. Manchester and New York: Manchester University Press.
- Nelson, Janet L. (1991). The Annals of St-Bertin. Manchester: Manchester University Press.
- Nelson, Janet L. (1992). Charles the Bald. London and New York: Longman.
- Nelson, Janet L. (1996). The Frankish World, 750-900. London: The Hambledon Press.
- Riché, Pierre (1993). The Carolingians: A Family Who Forged Europe. Philadelphia: University of Pennsylvania Press.
- Hummer, Hans J. Politics and Power in Early Medieval Europe: Alsace and the Frankish Realm 600 – 1000. Cambridge University Press: 2005. ISBN 0-521-85441-5
- Smith, Julia M. H. Province and Empire: Brittany and the Carolingians. Cambridge University Press: 1992. ISBN 0-521-38285-8

Preceded by Charles the Bald	Duke of Maine; 851–856	Succeeded by Louis the Stammerer
New title	Margrave of Neustria; 861–866	Succeeded by Hugh the Abbot
New title	Count of Anjou; 861–866	Succeeded by Odo
Preceded by Salomon	Count of Nantes; 861–866	Succeeded by Hugh the Abbot
