= Elder House of Welf =

Frankish noble dynasty

(Elder) House of Welf Rudolphins
- Frankish noble family
- Country: Kingdom of Burgundy; Kingdom of East Francia
- Founded: 8th century
- Founder: Ruthard, Count of Argengau
- Current head: None; extinct
- Final ruler: Rudolph III (Burgundy); Welf of Carinthia (Swabia)
- Titles: List: King of Burgundy; Duke of Carinthia; Count of Swabia; Count of Altdorf
- Estate: Orbe Castle
- Dissolution: 1032; 994 years ago (Burgundy); 1055; 971 years ago (Swabia)

The Elder House of Welf (known as Rudolphins in Burgundy) was a Frankish noble dynasty of European rulers documented since the 9th century. Closely related to the Carolingian dynasty, it consisted of a Burgundian and a Swabian group. It has not been definitively clarified, however, whether the two groups formed one dynasty or whether they shared the same name by coincidence only. While the Elder House became extinct in the male line with the death of Duke Welf of Carinthia in 1055, his sister Kunigunde married into the Italian House of Este and became the ancestor of the (Younger) House of Welf.

== Origins ==
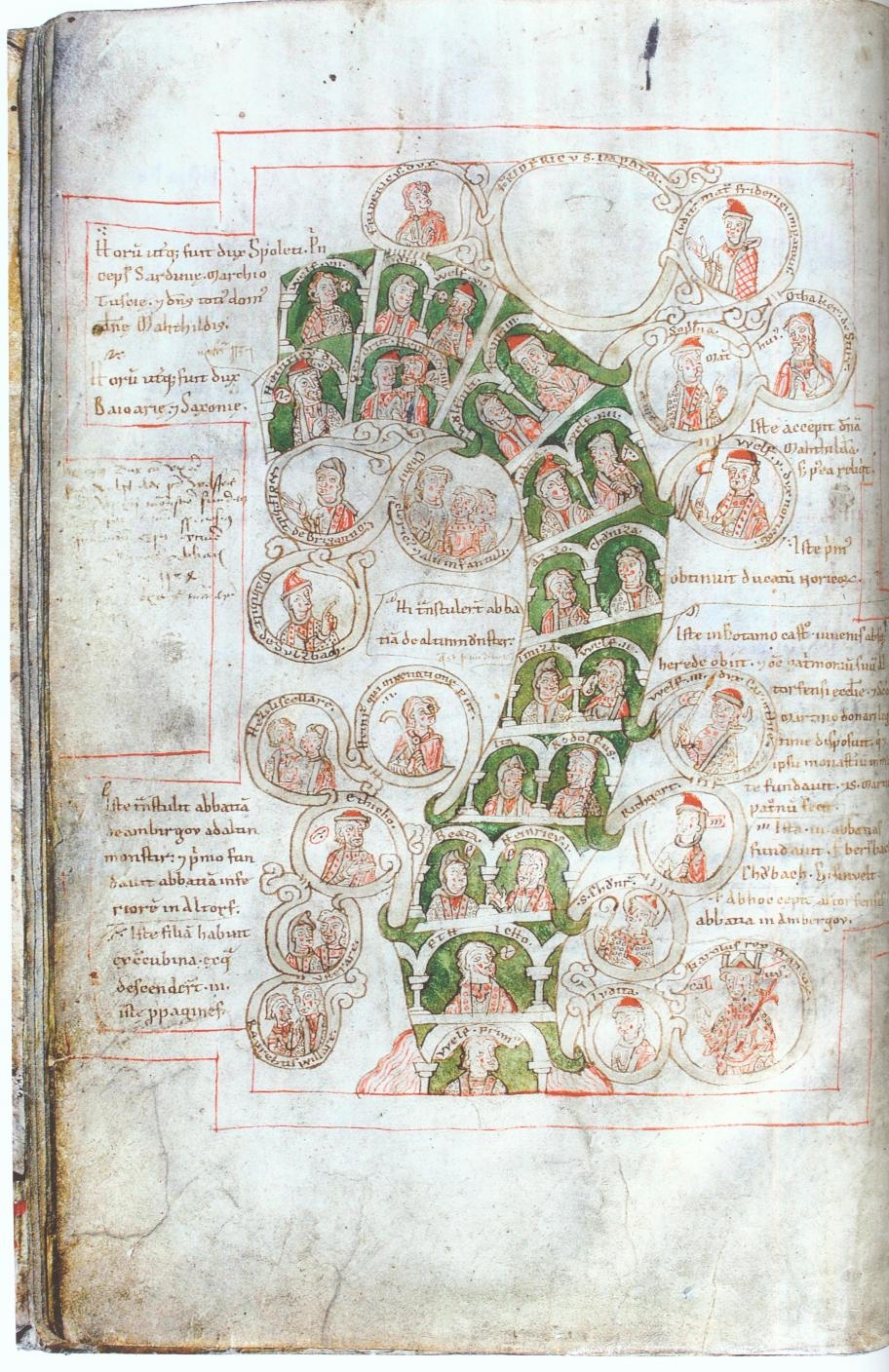
Family tree of the Welfs from the Historia Welforum.

According to a family tradition, the ancestry of the Welfs can be traced back to the Skirian prince Edeko (d. 469), a confidant of King Attila the Hun, and to his son Odoacer, King of Italy from 476. Nevertheless, an early ancestor may have been the Frankish nobleman Ruthard (d. before 790), a count in the Argengau and administrator of the Carolingian king Pepin the Younger in Alamannia.

The origin of the name Welf (also Guelph, from Italian: Guelfi) has not been conclusively established. A late medieval legend first documented in 1475 referred to a (non-historical) Duke Balthazar of Swabia, whose marriage had remained childless and who represented as his own heir and successor Bundus, the newborn son of one of his hunters. When Bundus came of age and was betrothed to a duchess of Guelders, his mother secretly informed him of the circumstances of his birth. The shocked young man waived both the duchess' hand and rule in Swabia. Retired, he spent the rest of his life at the Altdorf monastery. Only on his deathbed did he reveal the truth about his descendance and become known thenceforth as Herzog Wolf (Duke Wolf). Another popular version refers to the eleven (elf) sons of one Count Isenbart of Altdorf, whose mother wanted them to be drowned and years later was faced with those among them who escaped death.

== Burgundian branch ==
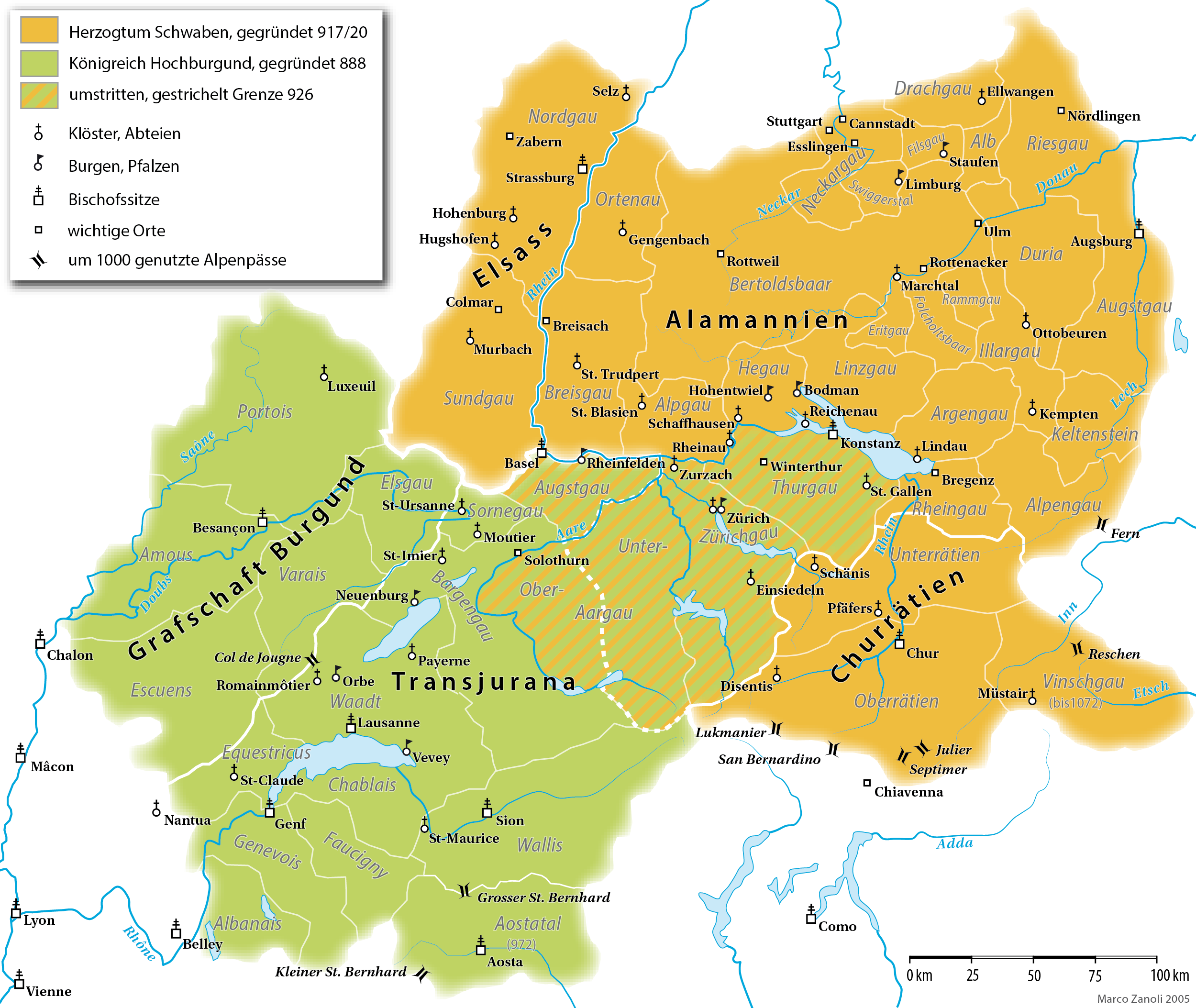
Upper Burgundy (green) and Alamannia (orange), including various counties held by prominent members of the Welf family

The older of the two groups was the Burgundian group. When the name first appeared in surviving documents, the family was already at the top of Francia society, with Welf, the first Count of Altdorf, the father-in-law of Emperor Louis the Pious (the son and heir of Charlemagne). He was mentioned in 819 as father of Empress Judith. The younger sons of the first count of Altdorf, Conrad and Rudolf accompanied their sister to the court of her husband, Louis the Pious, where their ambitious spirit maintained their hereditary rank, and where they shared the happy, as well as the adverse fortunes of that sister. When Judith was surprised and confined by her stepsons, her brothers were shaven as monks but claimed and obtained permission to stand beside the throne. Judith's sister Hemma (* 808 † 876) later married Judith's stepson Louis the German and became Queen of the Franks.

Conrad (the Elder) held several counties in Alamannia, including counties of Argengau and Linzgau, north of the Lake Constance, and later became Count of Paris. He had two sons: Conrad the Jounger (II) and Hugh, from his church preferment, styled the Abbot. He is traditionally given a third son, Welf I of the Swabian group. Conrad the Jounger became Count of Auxerre (c. 858), and later recovered the Burgundian estates of his grand-uncle Otkarius, defeating Hucbert of Transjuran Burgundy (c. 864).

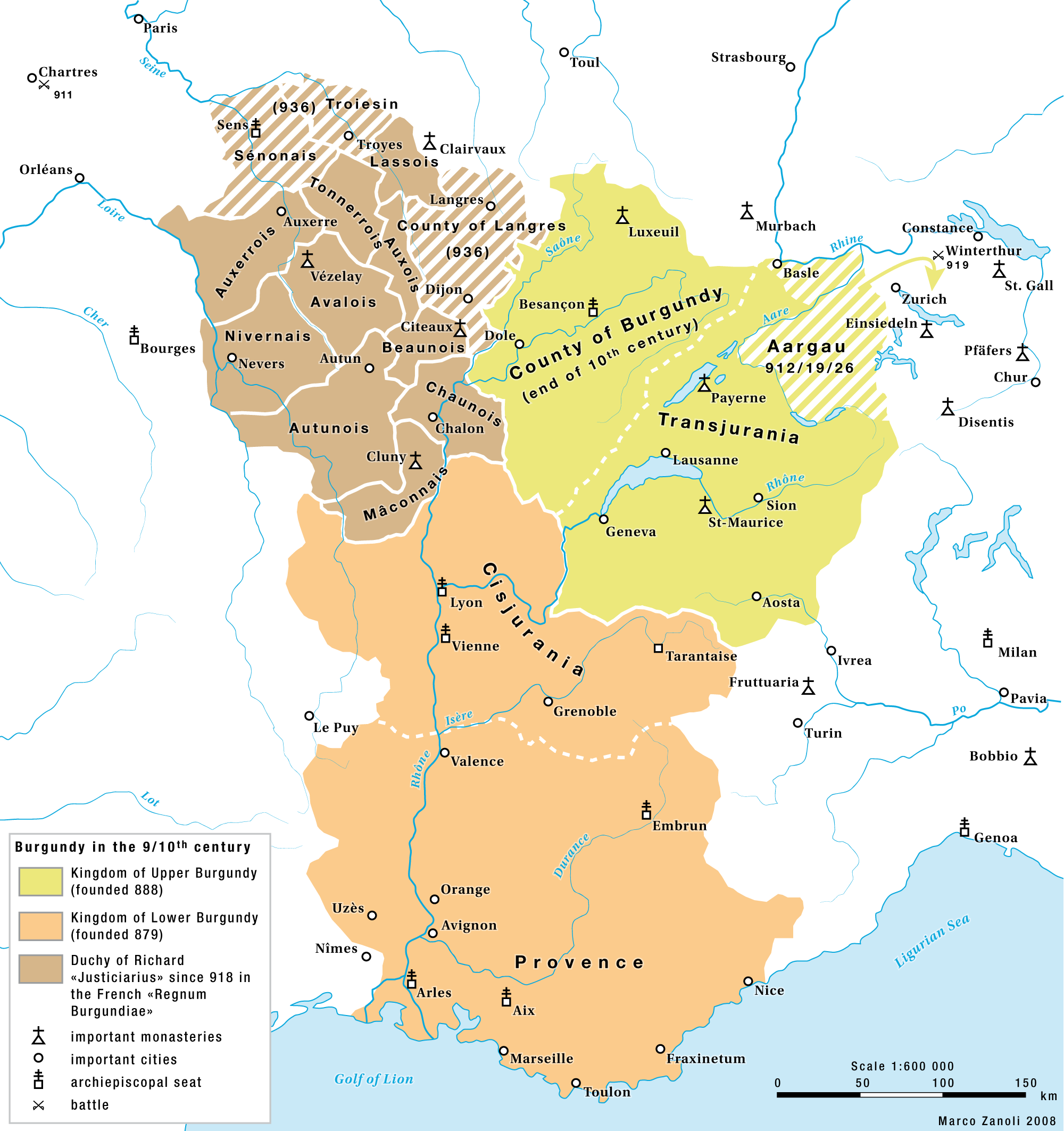
Burgundian lands, around 900 Upper Burgundy, ruled by Rudolph I Lower Burgundy, acquired by Rudolph II Duchy of Burgundy, belonging to the West Francia

Conrad the Jounger was succeeded in his Transjuran lands by his son Rudolph, who assumed the royal crown of Upper Burgundy at the abbey of St Maurice en Valais in 888, and confirmed his independence with two victories over king Arnulf of East Francia. His son, Rudolph II succeeded to the royal throne of Upper Burgundy in 912, and by 933 he also acquired Lower Burgundy with Provence, thus recreating the united Kingdom of Burgundy. He twice attempted the conquest of Italy, and for a period of three years governed that kingdom.

His son and successor, King Conrad I, reigned more than fifty-six years from 937 to 993 and enjoyed the friendship and support of the Saxon emperors. Otto I married his sister Adelaide, who was the mother of Otto II, and the grandmother of Otto III. Conrad was succeeded by his son Rudolph III, called the Idle. When Rudolph III died without legitimate issue in 1032, the Kingdom of Burgundy was inherited by his niece's husband Conrad of Swabia, who had been elected emperor in 1024. With this, the Kingdom of Burgundy was joined in personal union with those of Germany and Italy as part of what came to be known as the Holy Roman Empire.

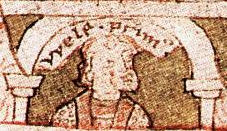
Welf, Count of Altdorf (819)

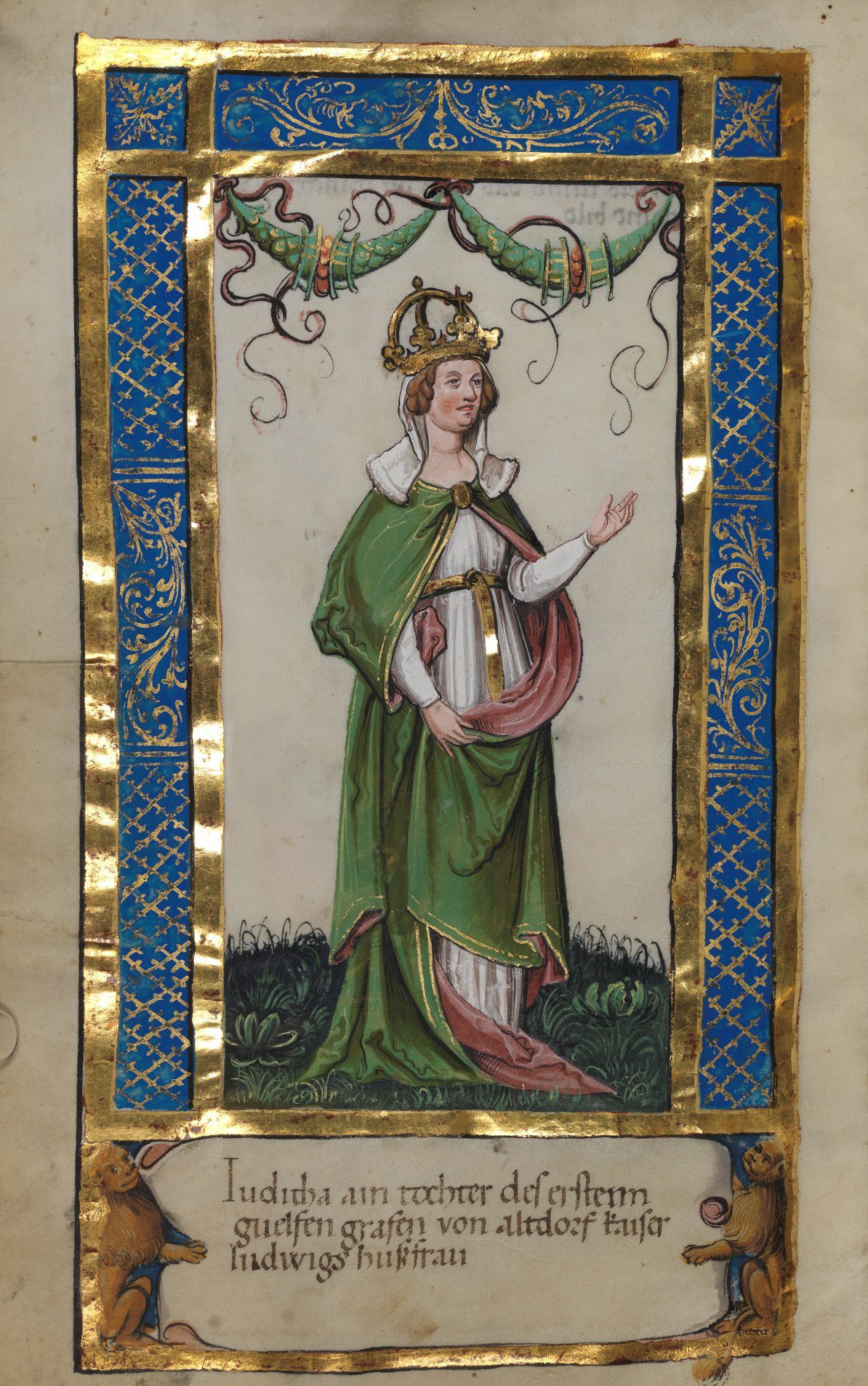
Empress Judith (* 795 † 843), daughter of Welf, wife of Emperor Louis the Pious

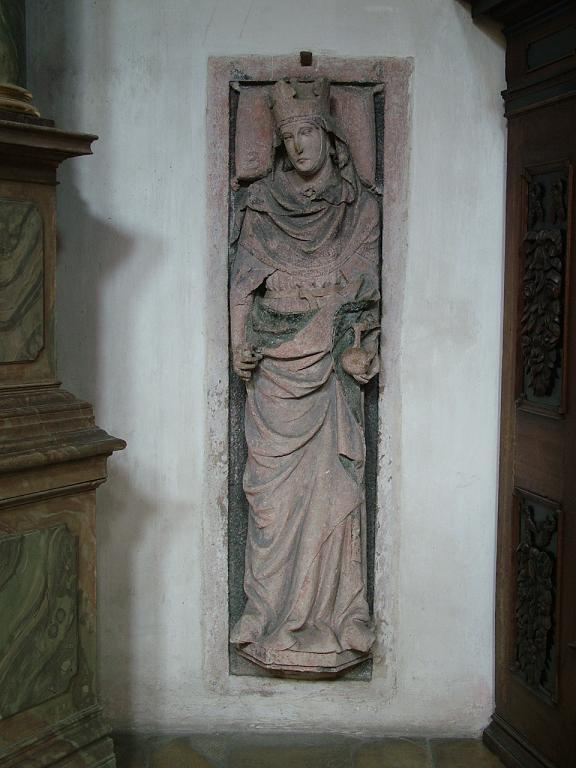
Queen Hemma (* 808 † 876), daughter of Welf, wife of King Louis the German

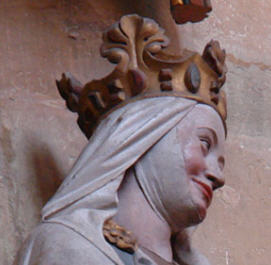
Empress Adelaide (* 931 † 999), daughter of Rudolph II of Burgundy, wife of Emperor Otto I

=== Notable members of the Burgundian group ===
- Welf, Count of Altdorf
- Judith, daughter of Welf, Empress
- Rudolph I, King of Burgundy
- Rudolph II, King of Burgundy
- Conrad I, King of Burgundy
- Gisela of Burgundy
- Adelaide of Italy
- Rudolph III, King of Burgundy

== Swabian branch ==
The oldest known member of the Swabian group was Welf I, a count in Swabia who was first mentioned in 842. According to legend, Welf I was a son of Conrad, son of Welf, count of Altdorf, the ancestor of the Burgundian group. This relationship is considered probable because both Conrad and Welf I were counts of Linzgau and Alpgau. The relationship between Welf I and all later members of the Swabian group (Welf, Duke of Carinthia, and his relatives, who were counts of Altdorf) is, again, known only through legend.

The Elder House of Welf became extinct when Welf, Duke of Carinthia, died childless in 1055. The property of the House of Welf was inherited by the elder branch of the House of Este that came to be known as the younger House of Welf, or House of Welf-Este.

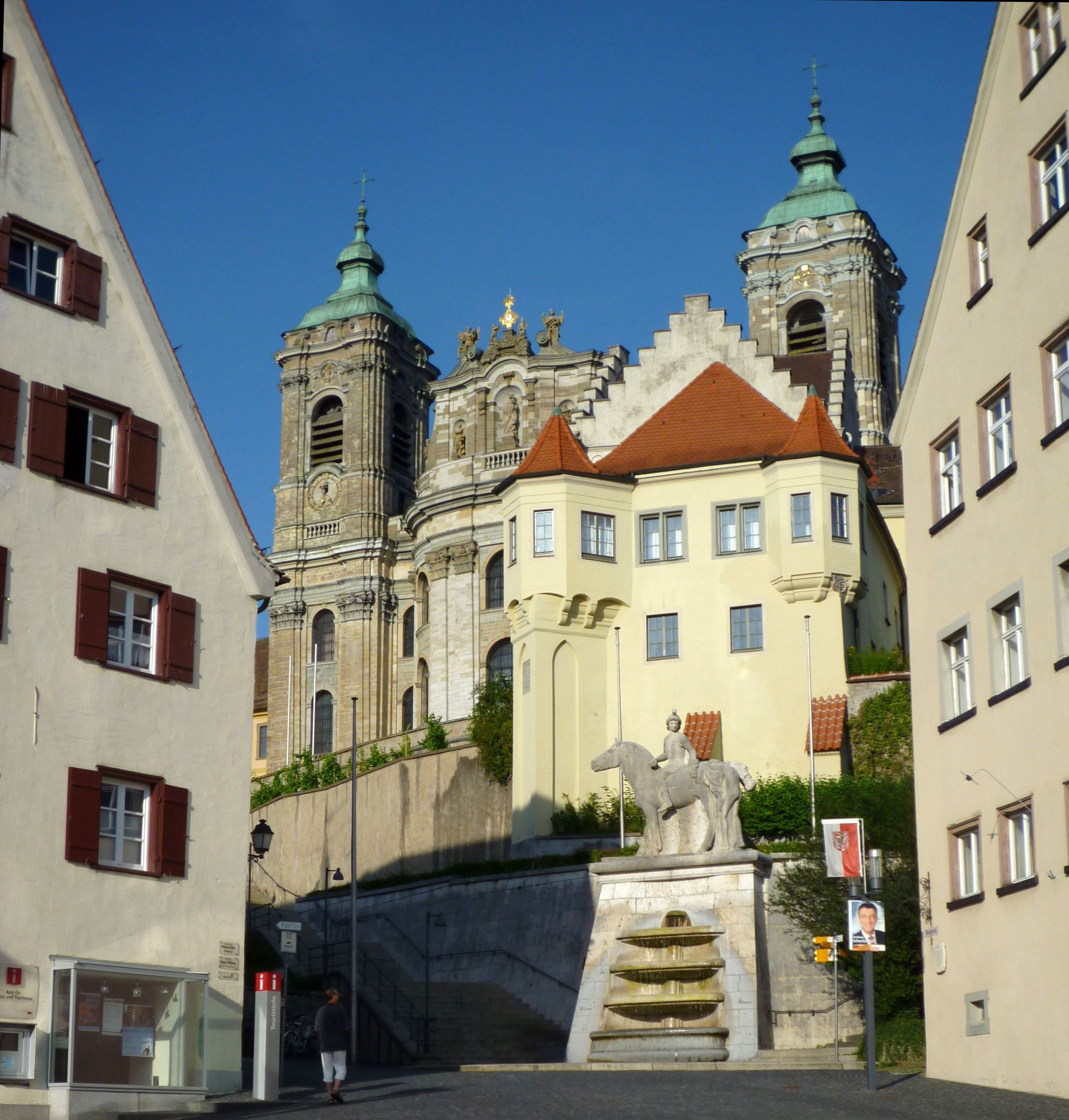
Altdorf (later Weingarten Abbey), Swabia

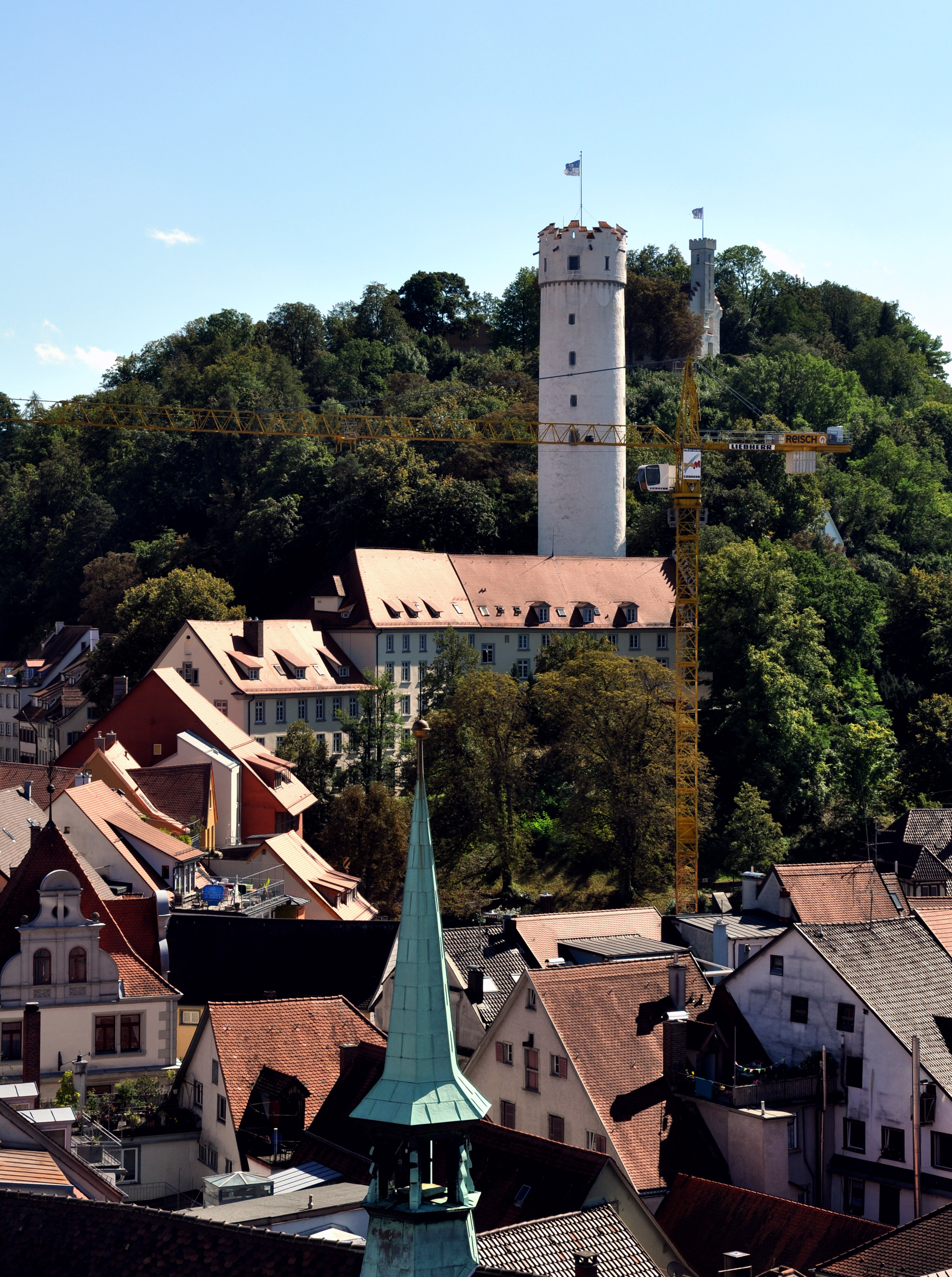
Ravensburg Castle, Swabia

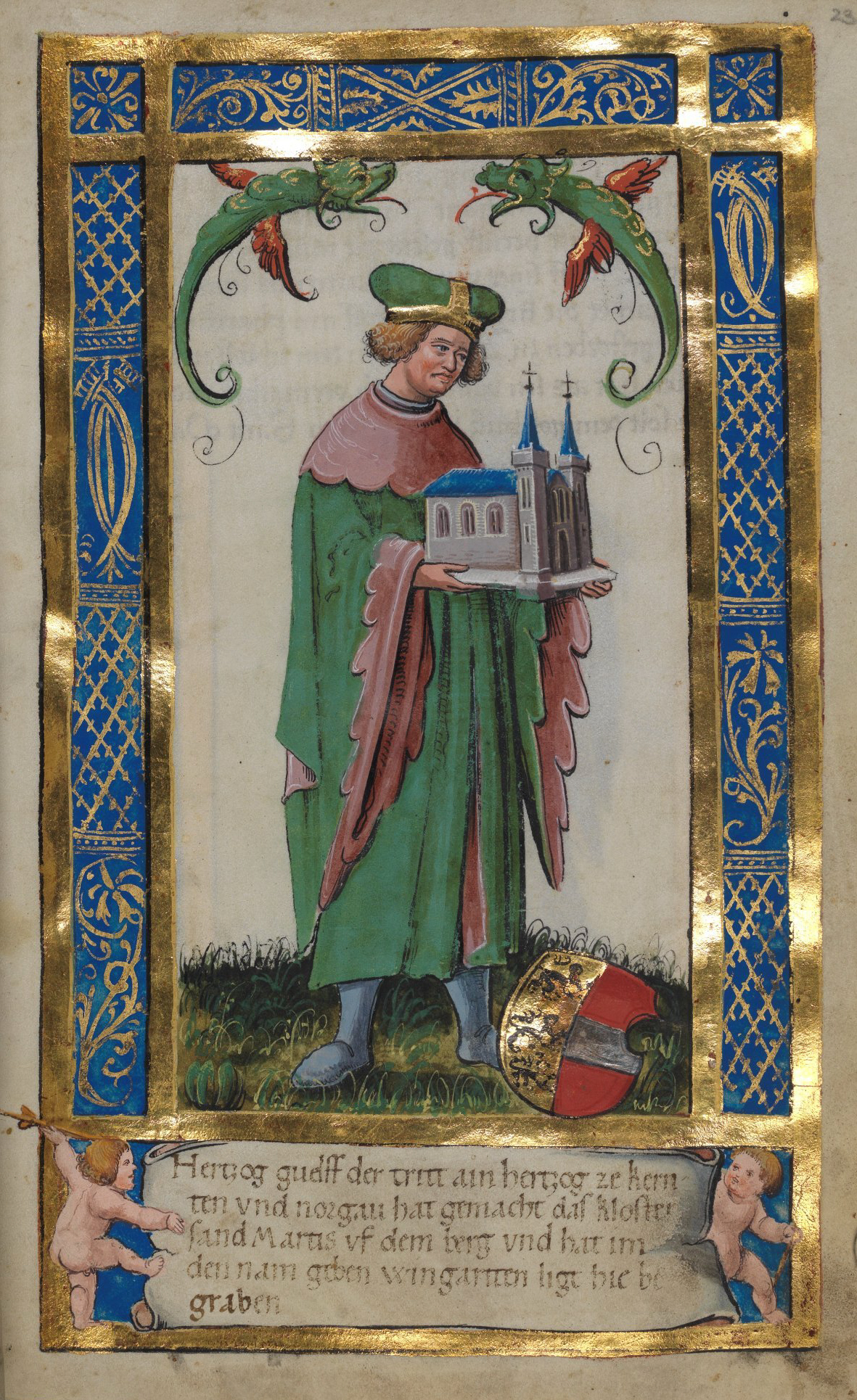
Welf III, Duke of Carinthia and Verona, the last male Welf of the Elder House

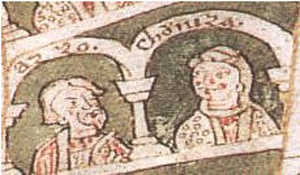
Kunigunde of Altdorf, sister of Welf III, wife of Albert Azzo II of Este, Margrave of Milan

=== Notable members of the Swabian group ===
- Welf I
- Saint Conrad of Constance
- Welf, Duke of Carinthia (Welf III)

== Genealogy of the Elder House of Welf ==
Stammbaum der Altere Welfinger (Elder House of Welf)

Ruthard (d. before 790) a count in the Argengau and administrator of the Carolingian king Pepin the Younger in Alamannia
Welf ( c. 776 – c. 825) count in Altdorf in Alamannia
Louis the Pious; Emperor s. of Charlemagne	Judith, Empress (c. 797 – 19 April 843)	Hemma (– 876) m. King Louis the German ygst son of Emp. Louis the Pious from 1st m. sons: King Louis the Younger, Carloman of Bavaria, King Charles the Fat	Konrad (d. 863) Count in Schussengau	Rudolf d. 866, count in Laienabt West Francia	Hrodroh (?)
Charles II the Bald (823–877) king of West Francia (843–877) & Italy (875–877); Emperor (875–877)	Konrad (d. bef. 878)(died around 876); Count of Auxerre from 858, and Lord of Transjuran Burgundy from 864.	Welf I (d. 876) Count in Alpgau, Linzgau, and possibly Argengau.	2 other sons, Rudolf & Hugo Abbas (d. 886)
Rudolph (c. 859–912); K. of Upper Burgundy (888–912)	Adelaide (d. 929) m. Richard, D. of Burgundy	Eticho, (d. 910), count of Ammergau, who m. Egila of Wessex
Rudolph II, K. of Burgundy (c. 880/885–937); K. of Upper Burgundy, 912–933, King of (all) Burgundy (933–937),K. of Italy (922–926)	Ludwig m. Adgiva of Wessex	Waldrada m. Count Bonifaz of Modena	Henry "with the Golden Wagen"(d. 934) (Henry, Count of Altdorf, Wikidata Q13724321 Count in Altdorf
Konrad (c. 925–993) K. of Burgundy (937–993)	Adelheid (d. 999) m1. Lothair II of Italy, m2. Emperor Otto I. the Great(Ottonian)	2. other sons, Burchard I., Archbischop of Lyon (d. 958) and Duke Rudolf	Rudolf I (see: (Rudolph I, Count of Altdorf, Wikidata Q61564330 (907 – c.940); Count in Altdorf & Lower Bavaria	St. Conrad of Constance (d. 975) Bishop of Constance
Rudolf III (970–1032); K. of Burgundy (993–1032)	Gisela (c. 955–1007) m. Heinrich II; Duke of Bavaria (Ottonian)	5 other children: Konrad Gerberga Berta Mathilde Burchard II	Rudolf II (d. c. 990); Count in Altdorf
Henry II (973–1024), Emperor (1014–1024); Ottonian dynasty	Cunigunde of Luxembourg	Welf II (c. 960/70 – d. 1030) Count in Lechrain/Schwabia m. Imiza of Luxembourg (niece of Emp. Cunigunde)
Welf III (c. 1007 – 1055); Duke of Carinthia & Margrave of Verona (1047–1055)	Kunigunde (Cuniza) (c. 1020 – 1054)	Azzo of Este (997–1097); Margrave of Milan. see: Obertenghi Genealogy, Obertenghi Genealogy (it) & Este Genealogy(it)	Garsende daughter of Herbert I, Count of Maine
Welf IV (c. 1035/1040 –1101) Duke of Bavaria (1070–1077)	Fulco I, Margrave of Milan; Margrave of Este	Hugh V (c. 1055/1062 – 1131); Count of Maine (1069–1093)
(Younger) House of Welf	House of Este

== Sources ==
- Bouchard, Constance B. (1999). "Burgundy and Provence, 879–1032". The New Cambridge Medieval History. Vol. 3. Cambridge: Cambridge University Press. pp. 328–345.
- Hauff, Andrea (2017). "The Kingdom of Upper Burgundy and the East Frankish Kingdom at the beginning of the 10th century". History Compass. 15 (8): 1–12.
- Hauff, Andrea (2018). "Carolingian Traditions and New Beginnings: The Coronation of Rudolph I of Upper Burgundy". Bulletin du centre d'études médiévales d'Auxerre. 22 (1): 1–13. Archived from the original on 2023-11-18.
- Heidecker, Karl (2010). The Divorce of Lothar II: Christian Marriage and Political Power in the Carolingian World. Ithaca and London: Cornell University Press.
- Nelson, Janet L. (1991). The Annals of St-Bertin. Manchester: Manchester University Press.
- Nelson, Janet L. (1996). The Frankish World, 750-900. London: The Hambledon Press.
- Reuter, Timothy (1992). The Annals of Fulda. Manchester: Manchester University Press.
- Riché, Pierre (1993). The Carolingians: A Family Who Forged Europe. Philadelphia: University of Pennsylvania Press.
- Schneider, Jens (2018). "Spatializing Meersen: Monasteries in Jurassian Burgundy (6th-9th c.)". Bulletin du centre d'études médiévales d'Auxerre. 22 (1): 1–20. Archived from the original on 2025-05-31.
