= Count of Tours =

During the early Middle Ages, the count of Tours was the ruler of the old Roman pagus Turonicus: the city of Tours and its hinterland, the Touraine.

Under the Merovingians, counts at Tours were appointed local representatives of the king, such as the base-born Leudast who had made his way at the Paris court of Charibert I and was appointed count at Tours by the king in the 570s, to the disgust of Gregory of Tours.

Under the early Carolingians, the counts of Tours stilled owed their position to the kings. In 828, Count Hugh was disgraced and removed from office for his reluctance to act after Abu Marwan's sack of Barcelona. Counts Adalard and Vivian (count 844–51) were also the lay abbots of St Martin's of Tours. After them the county and the abbacy were usually held together.

Robert the Strong who, besides Tours, also ruled the counties of Anjou and Blois, appointed viscounts to govern the Touraine in his absence. On his death in 866 he was succeeded by his stepson, Hugh the Abbot, inaugurating the hereditary countship. Hugh was followed by Robert's sons, Odo (d. 898) and Robert (d. 923). When Odo became king of France in 888, he gave his counties, including Tours, to Robert. On the death of the Robert's son, Hugh the Great, in 956, the Carolingian monarch reasserted his authority over the counties by refusing for four years to invest Hugh's son, Hugh Capet, with them. During this period, the viscounts of Anjou and Blois–Tours, who had begun to usurp comital power and the comital title, broke definitively with their Robertian overlords.
