= Conrad the Elder, Count of Argengau =

Frankish noble (d. circa 864)

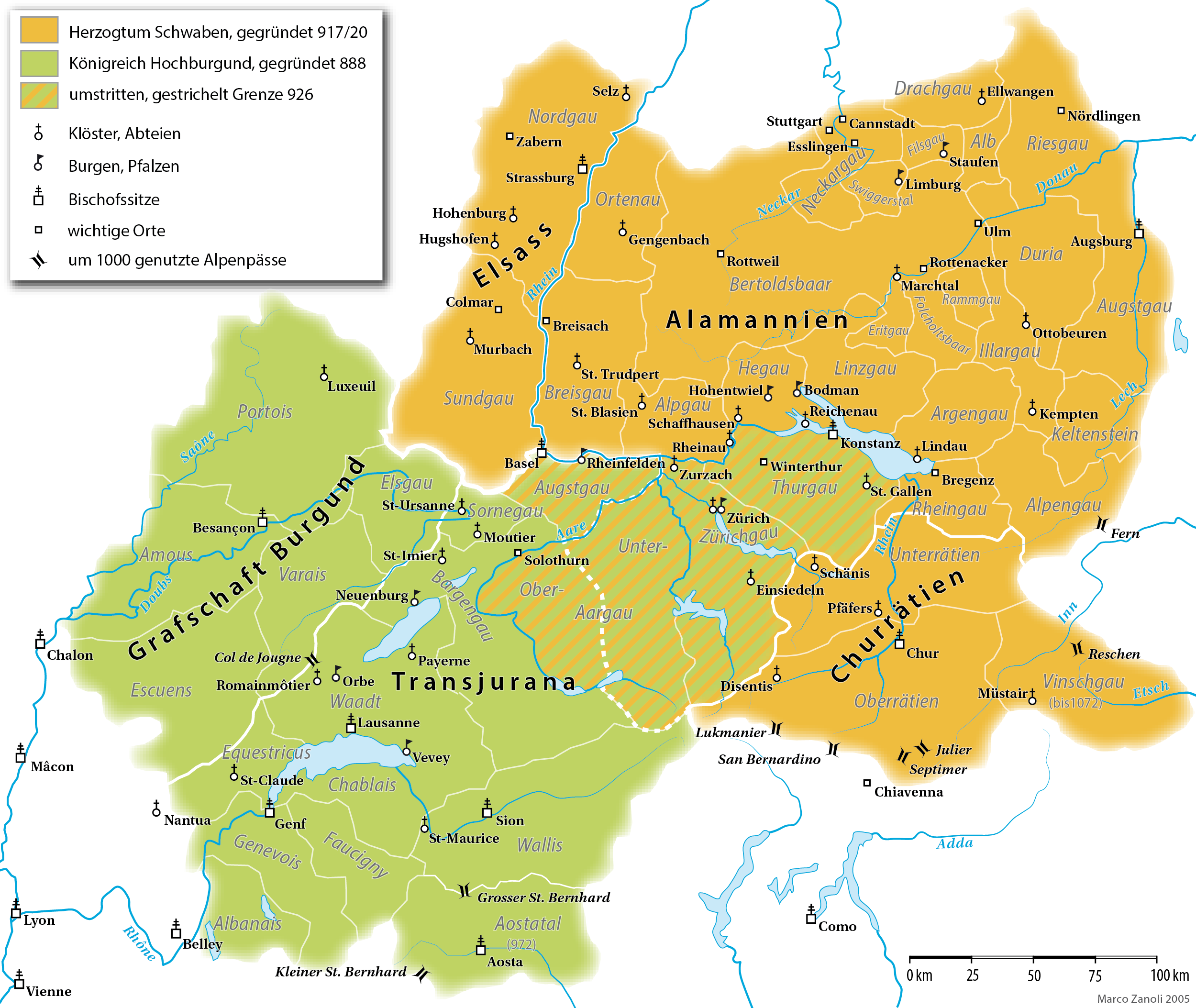
Upper Burgundy (green) and Alamannia (orange), including Conrad's old counties of Argengau and Linzgau (c. 1000)

Conrad the Elder (died about 864) was a prominent noble in the Carolingian Empire, and member of the Elder House of Welf. He was count of several counties in Alamannia, most notably the counties of Argengau and Linzgau, north of the Lake Constance. Conrad was son of count Welf I and countess Heilwig. Both of Conrad's sisters married into the Carolingian dynasty: the elder Judith was second wife of emperor Louis the Pious, while younger Emma was wife of king Louis the German of East Francia.

In 853-858, Conrad's sons left East Francia, and went over to king Charles the Bald of West Francia, who was Judith's son and thus Conrad's nephew. Since Conrad already held some lands in the West-Frankish County of Auxerre, including the position of a lay abbot of Saint-Germaine in Auxerre, his son Conrad the Younger was appointed Count of Auxerre by king Charles, while the other son Hugh became a monk and Abbot of Saint-Germain d'Auxerre. It is assumed that king Louis of East Francia reacted by confiscating most of their old fiefs and lands in Alamannia and Bavaria.

The Miracula Sancti Germani calls Conrad Chuonradus princeps (prince, sovereign), when recording his marriage.

== Family ==
Between 834 and 838, Conrad married Adelaide of Tours, daughter of Hugh of Tours. They had:

- Conrad the Younger (II), Count of Auxerre, Lord of Transjuran Burgundy.
- Hugh, the Abbot of Saint-Germain d'Auxerre.
- Probably his son was also Welf I count of Alpgau and Linzgau in Swabia

== Sources ==
- Heidecker, Karl (2010). The Divorce of Lothar II: Christian Marriage and Political Power in the Carolingian World. Ithaca and London: Cornell University Press.
- Nelson, Janet L. (1991). The Annals of St-Bertin. Manchester: Manchester University Press.
- Nelson, Janet L. (1992). Charles the Bald. London and New York: Longman.
- Nelson, Janet L. (1996). The Frankish World, 750-900. London: The Hambledon Press.
- Reuter, Timothy (1992). The Annals of Fulda. Manchester: Manchester University Press.
- Riché, Pierre (1993). The Carolingians: A Family Who Forged Europe. Philadelphia: University of Pennsylvania Press.
