= Conrad the Younger, Count of Auxerre =

Count of Auxerre

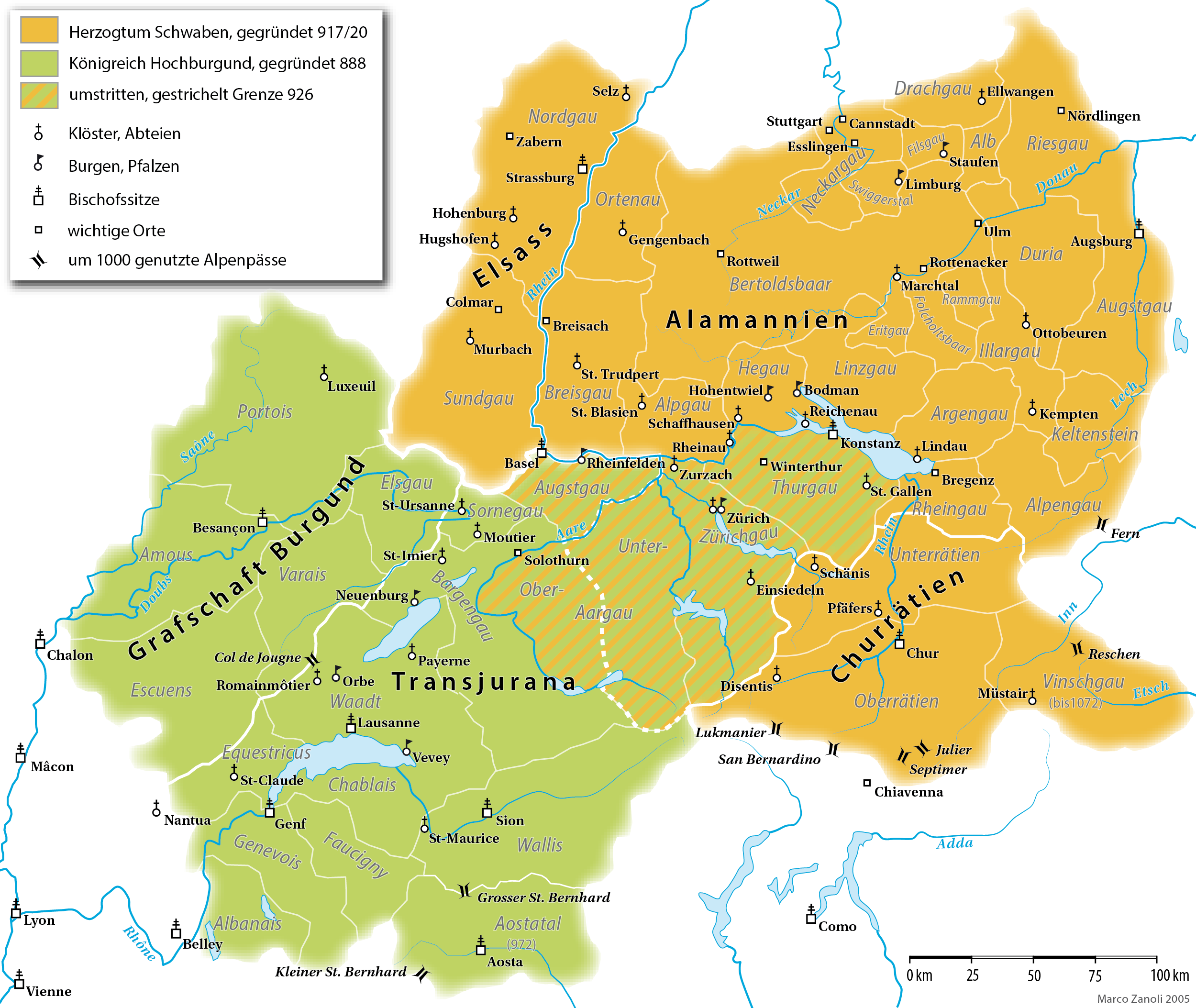
Upper Burgundy (green) including the Tranjuran regiona, and Alamannia (orange) including counties of Argengau and Linzgau (c. 1000)

Conrad the Younger (died around 876) was a prominent noble in the Carolingian Empire, and member of the Elder House of Welf. He was Count of Auxerre from 858, and Lord of Transjuran Burgundy from 864. He was a son of count Conrad the Elder and countess Adelaide of Tours. His brother was Hugh the Abbot.

Conrad's father, count Conrad the Elder initially held several counties in Alamannia, most notably the counties of Argengau and Linzgau, north of the Lake Constance. In 858, Conrad's family abandoned their sovereign, king Louis of East Francia, and went over to king Charles of West Francia, who was nephew of Conrad the Elder. They were rewarded by the West Frankish king, and thus Conrad the Elder became the Count of Paris, while his son Conrad the Younger became Count of Auxerre. In the same time, king Louis of East Francia confiscated their old fiefs and lands in Alamannia and Bavaria.

Conrad the Younger later recovered the old Burgundian estates of his grand-uncle Otkarius, defeating powerful lord Hucbert of Transjuran Burgundy (c. 864), and then continued to rule that region under the auspices of emperor Louis II. He left a son, Rudolf, who succeeded his father as Lord of Transjuran Burgundy, and later became King of Upper Burgundy (888). Conrad also had a daughter, Adelaide of Auxerre, who married Richard, Duke of Burgundy, and had issue. Some online genealogical sources may have him also married to Judith of Friuli, but there is no source for this, and she is not known to have married to anyone.

== Sources ==
- Hauff, Andrea (2018). "Carolingian Traditions and New Beginnings: The Coronation of Rudolph I of Upper Burgundy". Bulletin du centre d'études médiévales d'Auxerre. 22 (1): 1–13. Archived from the original on 2023-11-18.
- Heidecker, Karl (2010). The Divorce of Lothar II: Christian Marriage and Political Power in the Carolingian World. Ithaca and London: Cornell University Press. ISBN 978-0-8014-3929-2.
- Nelson, Janet L. (1991). The Annals of St-Bertin. Manchester: Manchester University Press. ISBN 978-0-7190-3425-1.
- Nelson, Janet L. (1996). The Frankish World, 750-900. London: The Hambledon Press. ISBN 978-1-85285-105-7.
- Reuter, Timothy (1992). The Annals of Fulda. Manchester: Manchester University Press. ISBN 978-0-7190-3458-9.
- Riché, Pierre (1993). The Carolingians: A Family Who Forged Europe. Philadelphia: University of Pennsylvania Press. ISBN 0-8122-1342-4.
