= Odo of France =

King of West Francia from 888 to 898

Odo
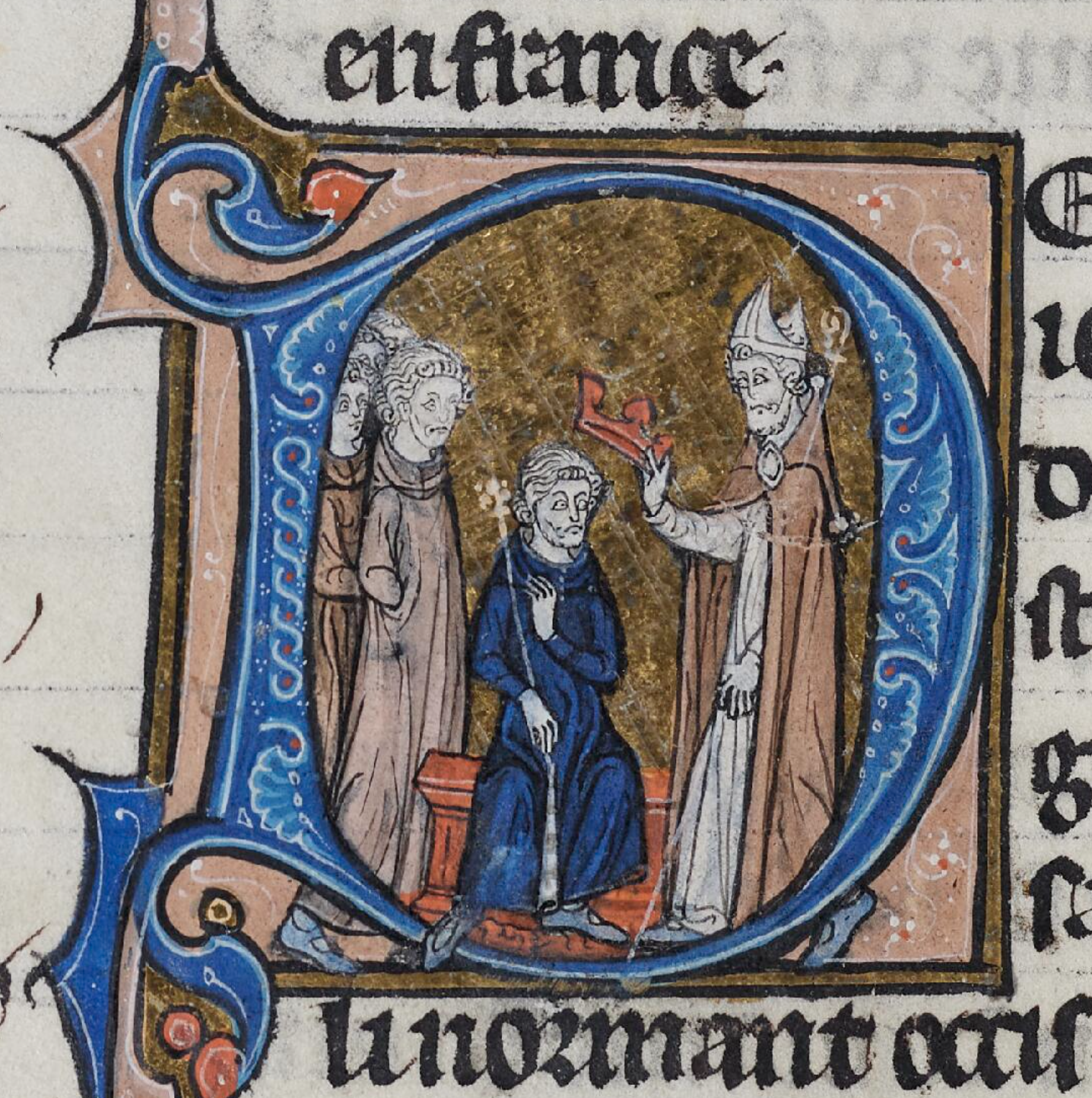
- Image of the coronation of Odo of France from the Grandes Chroniques de France (13th century)

King of West Francia
- Reign: 888–898
- Coronation: February 888, Compiègne
- Predecessor: Charles the Fat
- Successor: Charles the Simple
- Rival king: Guy of Spoleto (888)
- Born: c. 857
- Died: 1 January 898 (aged c. 41); La Fère, West Francia
- Burial: Abbey of Saint Denis
- Spouse: Théodrate of Troyes (m. 882)
- House: Robertian
- Father: Robert the Strong
- Mother: N. sister of count Adalhelm, or Adelaide of Tours

Odo (French: Eudes; c. 857 – 1 January 898), also known as Odo of Paris, was King of West Francia from 888 to 898. He was the first king from the Robertian dynasty, the parent house of the House of Capet. Before assuming the kingship, Odo was the Count of Paris, since 882. His reign marked the definitive separation of West Francia from the Carolingian Empire, which would never be reunited.

== Family and inheritance ==
Odo was the eldest son of Robert the Strong (died 866), Duke of the Franks, Margrave of Neustria, and Count of Anjou. Regarding the identity of Odo's mother, chronicler Regino of Prüm (died 915) stated that count Adalhelm was Odo's maternal uncle (Latin: avunculus), meaning that Odo's mother was count Adalhelm's sister. On the other side, some researchers have proposed that Odo's father Robert was married to Adelaide of Tours, but those suggestions are not universally acknowledged in scholarly literature, since it was shown that they were based on some misunderstandings in the Chronicle of St-Bénigne.

At the time of his father's death at the Battle of Brissarthe in 866, Odo and his brother Robert were still young, and thus king Charles the Bald appointed Hugh the Abbot (died 886) to govern over counties previously held by Robert the Strong. Since 882, Odo was the Count of Paris, and gained prominence during the reign of Charles the Fat (884–887). Odo was also the lay abbot of St. Martin of Tours.

In 882 or 883 Odo married Théodrate of Troyes. The eleventh-century chronicler Adémar de Chabannes wrote that they had a son, Arnoul (c. 882–898), who died shortly after his father. Guy is named as one of the couple's children in an Alan I's charter dated 28 August 903, but genealogist Christian Settipani has argued that the document is false. The genealogical work Europäische Stammtafeln refers to Raoul as a son of Odo by Théodrate, but its primary source is not known.

In July of 885, a large army of Northmen sailed down the Seine and arrived at Paris on 24 November. After failed negotiations, they attempted to overrun the city in an assault, but as Odo and Bishop Joscelin had refortified Paris in the last few years, they were unsuccessful. A siege then took place. Odo and Joscelin defended Paris but after the bishop died on 16 April, Odo launched a sortie to break out and seek aid. Charles sent his commander Henry of Alemmania to relieve the defenders, but he died in the attempt. Charles paid off the Vikings to move onto Burgundy.

There's significant evidence to suggest that Odo's rise was not in opposition to Charles, but instead as a result of his alignment with the emperor. Odo visited Charles' court, where he was viewed as a loyal and capable subordinate, and received confirmation of his lands. In addition, he was well-connected in the region, where many of his father's supporters lay.

== Reign ==
=== Coronation ===
Map of the former Carolingian empire in 888

Emperor Charles' position rapidly deteriorated through 887, and he was deposed at the end of the year by a revolt led by Arnulf of Carinthia, who was elected as the King of East Francia. His death created a power vacuum in the Carolingian empire that led to the rise of kings in East Francia, Provence, Upper Burgundy, and Italy. Odo had demonstrated bravery and skill during the Siege of Paris, and had now inherited the property of both Bishop Joscelin of Paris and Hugh the Abbot. He held military command of Neustria and three lay abbacies. Odo was chosen by the West Frankish nobles to be their king. He was crowned at Compiègne in February 888 by Walter, Archbishop of Sens.

Fulk, the Archbishop of Reims, attempted to resist Odo and invited Guy of Spoleto to take the crown, but he had little success. Fulk sought Arnulf, but as he considered this offer Odo decisively defeated a viking force at Montfaucon, which caused Arnulf to switch his support over to Odo. Odo met with Arnulf and entered into his protection, receiving recognition of his rule. Odo successfully won over many of the magnates through both promises and threats, although he ended the Carolingian policy of giving away the royal fisc, and failed to fully integrate them into his government. As he consolidated his position, Odo organized a second coronation in November, at Reims, and compelled Fulk to submit to him for a second time. Odo defeated the vikings again at Clermont, and in a battle on the River Allier his standard bearer was killed, though he still won. It seems that Fulk's faction at this point remained quite weak. Ranulf (or Ramnulf) of Aquitaine submitted by 889.

Odo's power was constrained outside of his family landholdings. He was rarely outside of Northern France, and one of his charters issued in Aquitaine was made on the condition of the count's consent. He was still the last ruler of West Francia for three centuries to take any interest in Aquitaine. In 890 Odo granted special privileges to the County of Manresa in Osona. Odo's honores had been much of the reason that he was able to attain the throne, and upon his accession he gave his brother, Robert, the majority of them. Robert became Count of Paris, Count of Poitiers, and became well-connected in Neustria.

=== Difficulties ===
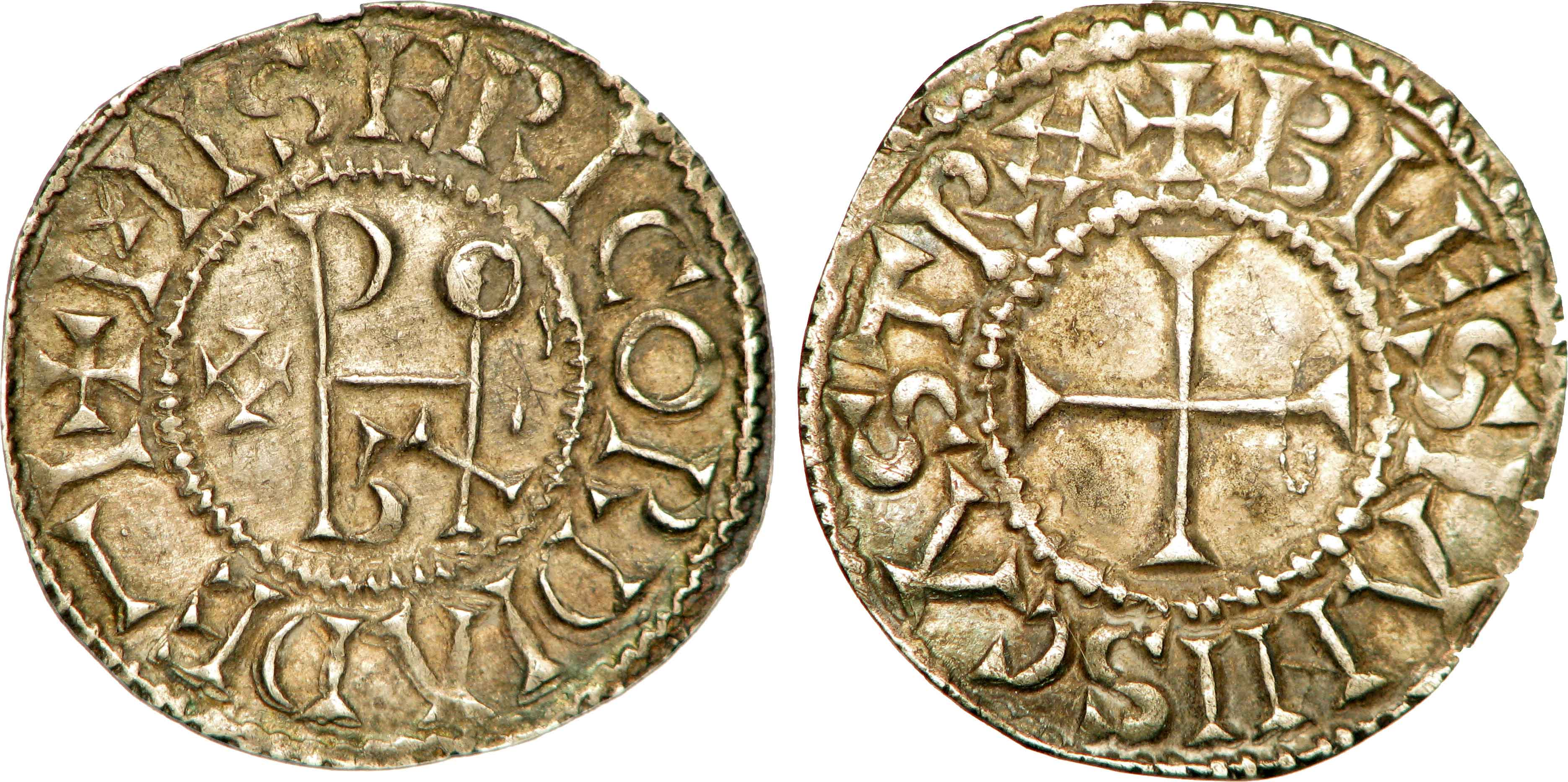
Denier of King Odo

After 890, with the initial phase of consolidation largely complete, the number of diplomas issued by Odo dropped. There had been a kingdom-wide assembly in 889 at Orléans, but in subsequent councils in the early 890s the rate of attendance dropped. For the next few years, Odo and Fulk appeared to have cooperated, helped by the king's attempts at appeasement. Fulk gave political and ecclesiastical aid to the king, and received Odo's support in kind. It was not until 892 that a significant force in favor of Charles arose, which contacted Archbishop Fulk seeking his support. It included Odo's old ally Herbert of Vermandois (who defected back to him in 896), Bishop Anscharic of Paris, and his mother Adelaide. Their opposition probably stemmed from a mix of genuine support for Charles (in the case of his mother), opposition to Odo, or opportunity for political advancement. After this point, Count Robert would almost monopolise control of Odo's court due to defections and deaths of other members.

Meanwhile, Odo's political situation began to weaken in southern France, as when he granted Poitiers to Altmar, a revolt broke out. Odo reneged on his decision and granted Poitiers to Robert, but then back to Altmar. Ebalus Manzer, the son of Ramnulf II, revolted alongside his relative Abbot Ebolus of St. Germain due to this. Odo was too distracted to fight them effectively. Also in 892, Baldwin II of Flanders who had earlier opposed Odo but been pacified, revolted again over the abbey of St. Germain. Odo recaptured Laon, seized by Baldwin, executed his ally Walter, and was assisted in the revolt by Fulk, who threatened the margrave (rather than count) with excommunication.

=== Civil war ===
By now, Odo had lost the symbolic capital from his victories and was handicapped by his lack of blood-claim to the throne. It was finally in 893 which Fulk chose to crown the 14-year-old Charles the Simple at Reims. They were supported by Pope Formosus, who with Fulk attempted to rally international support for Charles. A war broke out, and the rival parties marched armies against each other, but left without fighting. Odo won a surprise attack in the Autumn that forced Fulk onto the backfoot, and then besieged Fulk's faction at Reims.

Fulk was forced to seek support from Arnulf, who recognized the young Charles as king in 894, probably to ensure the safety of his lands in Lotharingia and secure Charles' submission. The Lotharingian troops sent by Arnulf to support Charles were largely ineffectual, many being politically allied with Odo. In 895, Arnulf invited both Charles and Odo to his court. Odo went, but Charles' supporters only sent a letter, and thus Arnulf conferred his support back onto the Robertian. After realising his mistake, Fulk went as damage control, but on the way was caught by Odo and barely managed to escape, his ally Adalung being killed. Later the same year, Zwentibold was appointed by his father as King of Lotharingia. Promised part of West Francia, he invaded in favor of Fulk and seized Laon, but the coalition soon broke down and he left.

Odo had retained control of the whole of West Francia, and was effectively militarily victorious, but after lengthy negotiations he agreed to cede part of the realm to him in 896. More defections followed from Charles' side, including the aforementioned one of Herbert, but a definitive peace was established soon afterwards, in which Odo made Charles his successor to the kingdom. Odo died in La Fère on 1 January 898 and was succeeded by Charles. (Note: "King Odo became ill at La Fere-sur-Oise, fell into a coma, and died on 1 January 898...")

== In popular culture ==
A character named Count Odo is portrayed by Owen Roe in the 2013 History Channel series Vikings. The fictional Odo saves Paris from a Viking attack, but is killed before succeeding in becoming king.

Count Odo appears in The Siege of Paris, the second expansion to the 2020 video game Assassin's Creed Valhalla.

== Sources ==
- Bradbury, Jim (2007). The Capetians: Kings of France, 987-1328. London: Continuum Books. ISBN 978-1-85285-528-4.
- Jackman, Donald C. (2008). Comparative Accuracy. State College, PA: Editions Endlaplage. ISBN 978-1-936466-81-8.
- MacLean, Simon (2003). Kingship and Politics in the Late Ninth Century: Charles the Fat and the end of the Carolingian Empire. New York: Cambridge University Press. ISBN 978-1-139-44029-5.
- Nelson, Janet L. (1991). The Annals of St-Bertin. Manchester: Manchester University Press. ISBN 978-0-7190-3425-1.
- Nelson, Janet L. (1992). Charles the Bald. London and New York: Longman. ISBN 978-1-317-89957-0.
- Nelson, Janet L. (1996). The Frankish World, 750-900. London: The Hambledon Press. ISBN 978-1-85285-105-7.
- Riché, Pierre (1993). The Carolingians: A Family Who Forged Europe. Philadelphia: University of Pennsylvania Press. ISBN 0-8122-1342-4.
- Lösslein, Horst (2019). Royal Power in the Late Carolingian Age: Charles III the Simple and His Predecessors. Modern Academic Publishing. ISBN 978-3-946198-48-2.
- Poupardin, René (2017). Louis the Pious and the Carolingian Kingdoms. Jovian Press. ISBN 978-1537804248.

Regnal titles
Preceded by Charles the Fat	King of West Francia; 888–898	Succeeded by Charles the Simple
Preceded by Conrad	Count of Paris; 882–888	Succeeded by Robert
Preceded by Hugh the Abbot	Margrave of Neustria; 886–888	Succeeded by Robert
