= Welf I =

Swabian nobleman

Welf I or Welfo (died before 876) was a Swabian nobleman. He was a member of the Elder House of Welf.

Welf was probably a son of Conrad I of Auxerre, and seems to have taken over his father's offices in Swabia, namely: count of Alpgau, count of Linzgau, and possibly count of Argengau. However, when Conrad and his other sons changed allegiance from King Louis the German to his half-brother King Charles the Bald in 859, Welf disappears from the historical record. It is assumed that he fell out of favor with King Louis and lost his offices; the Swabian branch of the Elder Welfs was not mentioned again until Rudolf II, Count of Altdorf, who died around 990 and was — according to legend — a descendant of Welf.

== Genealogy ==
His son was Eticho, count of Ammergau (died after 911), who married Egila and had a son:

- Henry, Count of the Golden Wagon; who married Atha von Hohenwart and had issue:
  - Rudolf I, Count of Altdorf, who married Siburgis and had a son:
    - Rudolf II, Count of Altdorf.
