= Théodrate of Troyes =

Queen of France from 888 to 898

Queen consort of West Francia
- Tenure: 888–1 January 898
- Born: 868
- Died: 903 (aged 34–35); Alsace, France
- Spouse: Odo, Count of Paris (m. 882; died 898)

Théodrate of Troyes (also Théodérade, Théodrade; 868—903) was the wife of Odo, Count of Paris and queen consort of West Francia from 888 to 898. Evidence of Théodrate and Odo's children come from non-contemporary or historically inauthentic sources. The eleventh-century chronicler Adémar de Chabannes wrote that they had a son, Arnoul (c.882-898), who died shortly after his father Odo. Guy is named as one of the couple's children in an Alan I's charter dated 28 August 903, but genealogist Christian Settipani says it's a falsification.

Royal titles
Preceded by Richardis	Queen consort of Western Francia; 888-898	Succeeded by Frederuna
