= Lay Intellectuals in the Carolingian World =

2007 book by Wormald and Nelson

- Author: Patrick Wormald; Janet Nelson
- Language: English
- Genre: Non-fiction
- Publisher: Cambridge University Press
- Publication date: 2007

Lay Intellectuals in the Carolingian World is a 2007 non-fiction book edited by Patrick Wormald and Janet Nelson and published by Cambridge University Press.

Reviewing the book in 2010 for the journal Early Medieval Europe, Courtney M. Booker said: "According to Jinty Nelson, the volume’s co-editor, Wormald conceived and organized for the Kalamazoo International Congress on Medieval Studies in 1999 and 2000 a series of panels on the theme of the lay intellectual in the early Middle Ages, and planned to publish the results in an edited collection. Thanks to the combined efforts of the contributors (and to the particular labour of Nelson) to carry through Wormald's vision, Lay Intellectuals is the belated realization of that plan."
