= Alpgau =

German place

Coordinates: 47.721°N 8.176°E

Alpgau (also Albgau) was a territory of Alemannia and the Duchy of Swabia during the 8th to 12th centuries. It comprised St. Blaise in what is now the Waldshut district of Baden-Württemberg.

It is not to be confused with Alpengau, now known as Allgäu.
