= Argengau =

Medieval territory

47.695°N 9.72°E

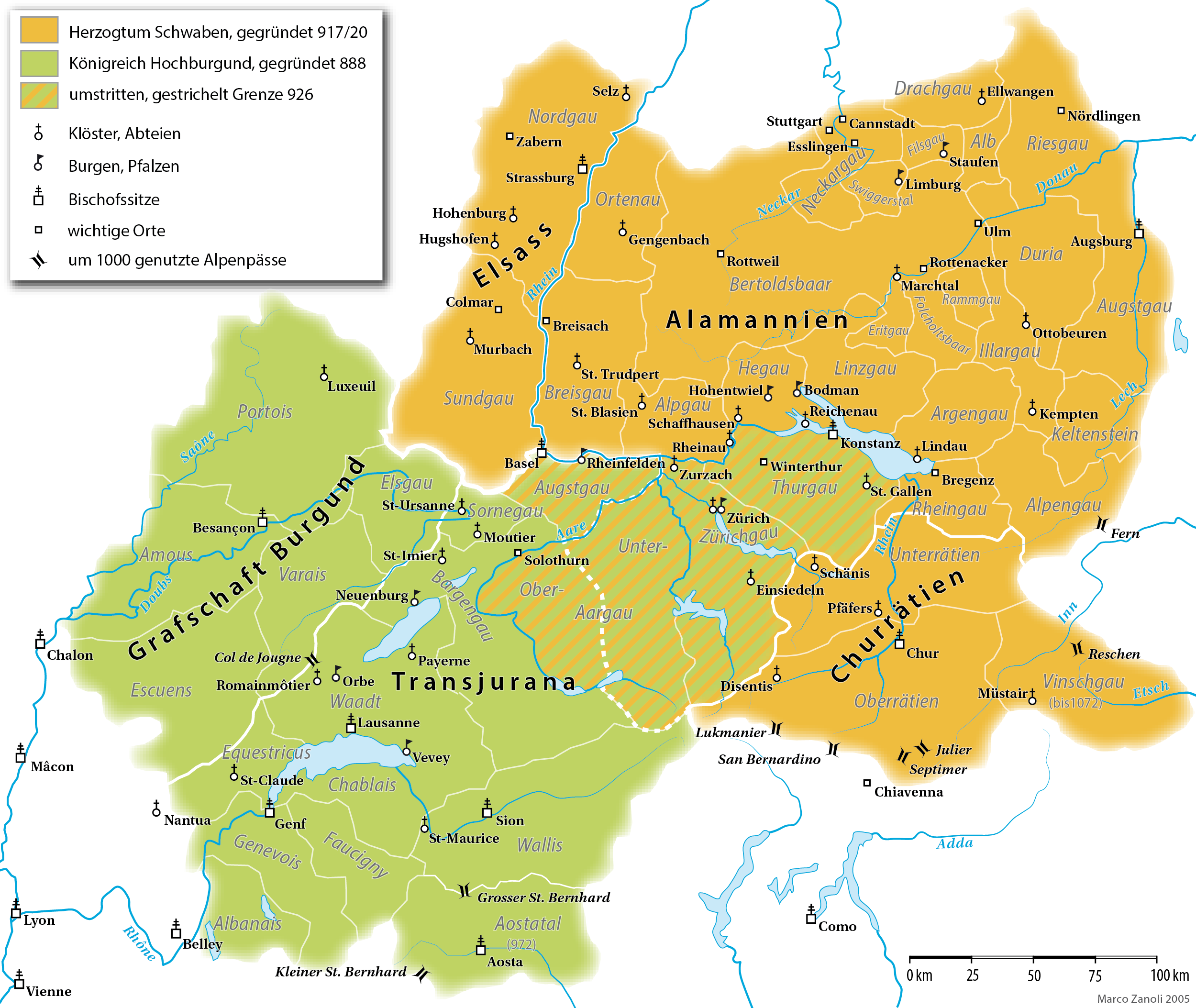
Upper Burgundy (green) and Alamannia (orange), including the County of Argengau

Argengau was a territory of medieval Alemannia, within East Francia in the 8th and 9th centuries, being a county in the 9th century, and belonging to the Duchy of Swabia in the 10th century. It was situated north of Lake Constance, comprising Lindau. It was named for the Argen river.

== See also ==
- Conrad the Elder, Count of Argengau
