= Abbey of Saint-Germain d'Auxerre =

Abbey in Yonne, France

Coordinates: 47°48′2″N 3°34′22″E

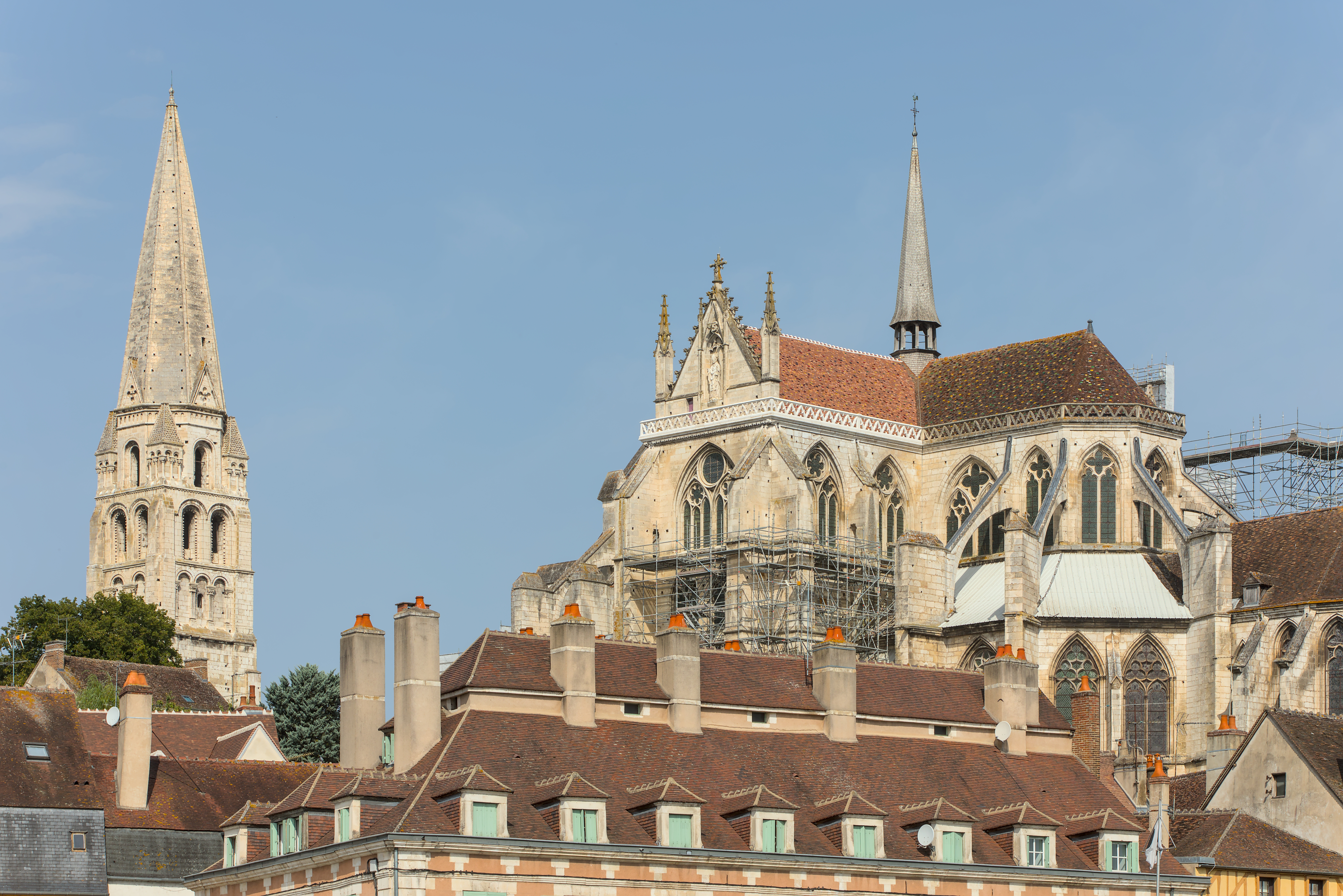
The abbey of Saint Germain and its Romanesque bell tower dominate Auxerre, Burgundy

The Abbey of Saint-Germain d'Auxerre is a former Benedictine monastery in central France, dedicated to its founder Saint Germain of Auxerre, the bishop of Auxerre, who died in 448. It was founded on the site of an oratory built by Germanus in honor of Saint Maurice.

== History ==
Bishop Germain was buried in the Oratory of Saint Maurice, which he had built. About the year 500, it was rebuilt as a basilica, by Queen Clotilda, wife of Clovis, in honor of the bishop. The tomb was below the church, under the apse.

A monastery was established that followed the Benedictine rule. In 850 Abbot Conrad, brother-in-law of Louis the Pious, had a crypt built. Attached to the crypt was a circular oratory. Conrad's nephew, Emperor Charles the Bald, was present at the translation of the relics of Germanus. The abbey reached the apex of its cultural importance during the Carolingian era; the source for its early history is an account of the Miracula Sancti Germani Episcopi Autissiodorensis ("Miracles of Saint Germain, Bishop of Auxerre") written before ca. 880. The earliest surviving architectural remains are also of the ninth century. The abbey had a noted school. From 876 to 883 Remigius of Auxerre was master of the school. Later, Thomas Becket studied there after completing his law courses in Bologna. Monk and chronicler, Rodulfus Glaber, spent time at St Germain, where, he said, foreign monks were always accepted with respect.

The abbey was twice reformed, first by Majolus of Cluny and his disciple Heldric, at the request of Henry I, Duke of Burgundy, and in 1029 by the Congregation of Saint Maur. A fire consumed much of the abbey in 1064; the Merovingian nave was rebuilt. In 1069, monks from St. Germain founded Selby Abbey in North Yorkshire. Napoleon turned the establishment into a hospital.

In 1927, beneath the 17th-century frescoed plaster walls of the crypt, were discovered ninth-century wall frescoes, the only surviving large-scale paintings of their date in France to compare to the illuminated manuscripts.

During the Revolution, several bays of the nave were demolished and the secularized abbey was used as a hospital. The former nave extended beneath the present forecourt.

In the late twentieth century the abbey's residential and service buildings were remodeled as a museum, presenting prehistoric, Gallo-Roman and medieval finds from Auxerre. An exhibition in 1990 brought the abbey's cultural impact into focus. The former abbey church remains in use for worship at stated times.

== Known abbots ==
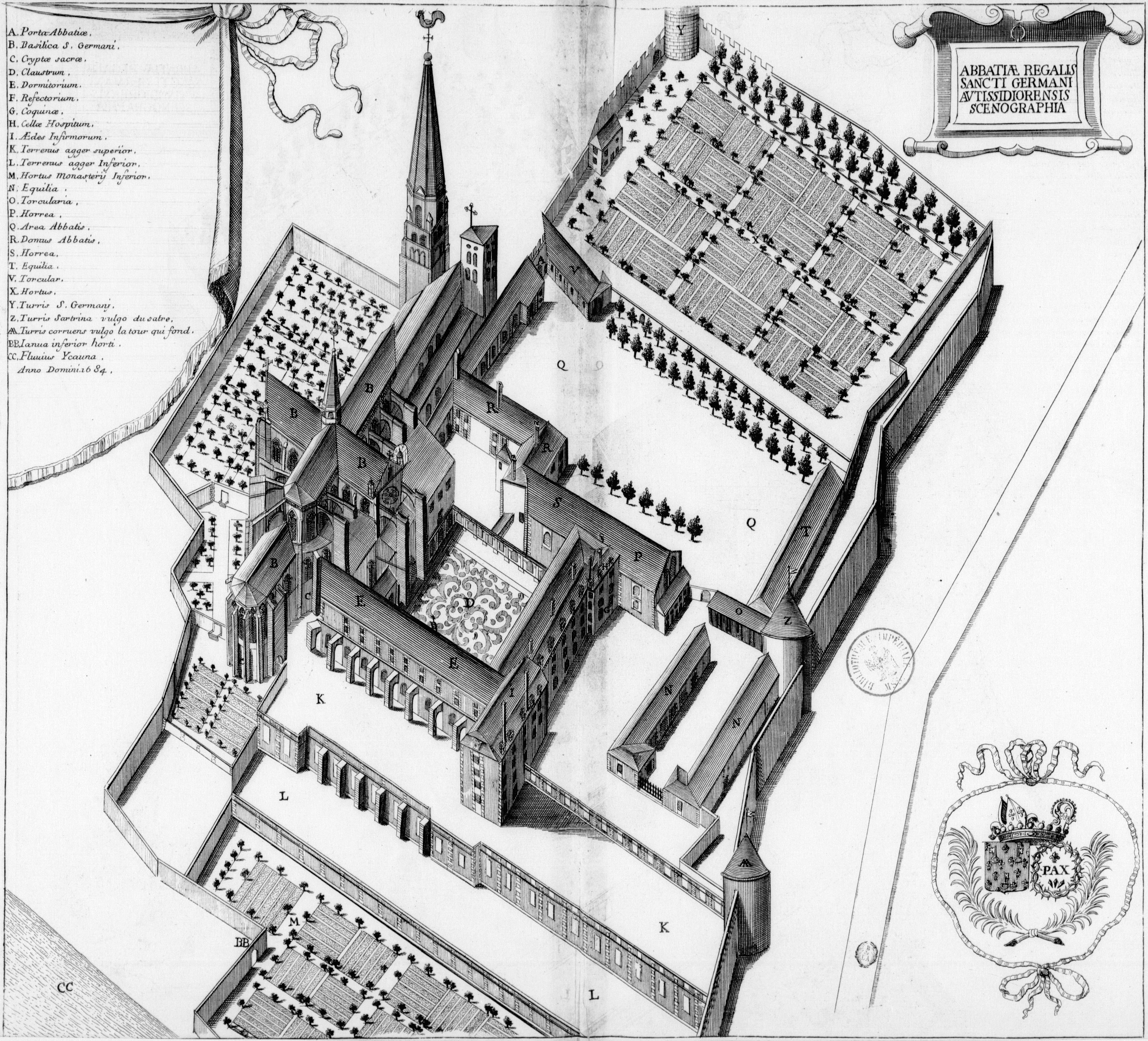
Abbey in 17th century.

- ? - 622: Palladius of Auxerre
- 800? - 840?: Saint Abbo, Bishop of Auxerre († December 3, 860)
- 850? - †864: Conrad I, Count of Auxerre
- [...]? - 886? : Abbot Hugh († May 12, 886)
- 894-921: Richard Duke of Bourgogne11. ? -? : Heldric7,12 († 999), contemporary of St. Sévin Bishop of Sens.
- 986 - 1009: Heldric of Cluny
- 1010-1020: Achard
- 1020 - 1032: Theobold
- 1032 - 1052: Odo of Auxerre
- 1052 - 1064: Prior Boso
- 1064 - 1074: Walter from Saint-Benoît-sur-Loire
- 1075 - 1085: Roland
- 1085 - 1096: Guibert
- 1096-1100: Robert
- 1100-1115: Hugues de Montaigu, son of Dalmace Semur said Jeune14 approve this year a charter for the benefit of the Priory of Saint-Marcel Fleurey-sur-Ouche, signed by Duke Hugh II Bourgogne15. It will be bishop of Auxerre.
- 1115 - 1148: Gervais
- 1148 - 1174: Harduin
- 1174 - 1188: Humbert
- 1188 - 1208: Rudolph
- 1st half of the thirteenth century: Renaud Jocenal (alive May 13, 1222)
- 1285 - 1309: Guy Munois
- 1309 - 1334: Left Dignon Chéu
- 1334 - 1352: Étienne 1 Chitry
- 1352 - 1362: William Grimoard, future Pope Urban V
- 1362 - 1381: Stephen II Chitry
- 1381 - 1408: Hugues V of Ballore
- 1409 - 1422: John II of Nanton
- 1422/1423 - 1453: Hervé de Lugny
- 1453 - 1495: Hugues VI Tyard or Thiard
- 1542: Louis Lorraine17
- 1731: Dom Leonardo Le Texier, Grand Prior (1731).
- 1783: Dom Rosman

== See also ==
- Haimo of Auxerre
