= Lay abbot =

Layman given the revenues of an abbey

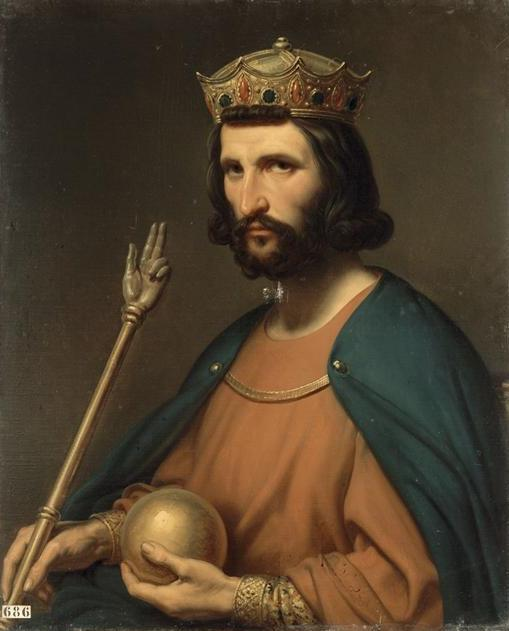
Hugh Capet was a lay abbot of 5 monasteries before he became a king

A lay abbot (Latin: abbatocomes, abbas laicus, abbas miles, lit. 'abbot-count, lay abbot, abbot-soldier') was a layman on whom a king or someone in authority bestowed an abbey as a reward for services rendered; he had charge of the estate belonging to it, and was entitled to part of the income. The custom existed principally in the Frankish Empire from the eighth century until the ecclesiastical reforms of the eleventh.

== Background ==
Numerous synods held in France in the sixth and seventh centuries passed decrees against this abuse of church property. The Merovingians had bestowed church lands on laymen, or at least allowed them their possession and use, though not ownership. The Merovingian kings were also in the habit of appointing abbots to monasteries which they had founded; moreover, many monasteries, though not founded by the king, placed themselves under royal patronage in order to share his protection, and so became possessions of the Crown.

== History ==
This custom of the Merovingian rulers was taken as a precedent by the French kings for rewarding laymen with abbeys, or giving them to bishops in commendam. Charles Martel was the first to bestow outright extensive existing ecclesiastical property upon laymen, political friends and soldiers. St. Boniface and later Hincmar of Reims picture most dismally the consequent downfall of church discipline, and though Boniface tried to reform the Frankish Church, the bestowal of abbeys on secular abbots was not abolished.

Charlemagne also frequently gave church property, and sometimes abbeys, in feudal tenure. The abbey of Saint-Riquier (Centula) in Picardy had secular abbots from the time of Charlemagne, who had given it to his friend Angilbert, the poet and the lover of his daughter Bertha, and father of her two sons. After Angilbert's death in 814, the abbey was given to other laymen.

Louis the Pious aided St. Benedict of Aniane in his endeavours to reform the monastic life. In order to accomplish this it was necessary to restore the free election of abbots, and the appointment as well of blameless monks as heads of the monastic houses. Although Louis shared these principles, he continued to bestow abbeys on laymen, and his sons imitated him. Although not a cleric, Einhard was lay abbot of the monastery of St. Bavo in Ghent and at his own foundation at Michelstadt.

Various synods of the ninth century passed decrees against this custom; the Synod of Diedenhofen (October, 844) decreed in its third canon, that abbeys should no longer remain in the power of laymen, but that monks should be their abbots In like manner the Synods of Meaux and Paris (845-846) complained that the monasteries held by laymen had fallen into decay, and emphasized the king's duty in this respect. But abbeys continued to be bestowed upon laymen, especially in France and Lorraine, e.g. St. Evre near Toul, in the reign of Lothair I. Lothair II, however, restored it to ecclesiastical control in 858, but the same king gave Bonmoutier to a layman; and the Abbeys of St. Germain and St. Martin, in the Diocese of Toul, were also given to secular abbots. In the Diocese of Metz, the Abbey of Gorze was long in the hands of laymen, and under them fell into decay. Stavelot and Malmedy, in the Diocese of Liège, were in the eleventh century bestowed on a certain Count Raginarius, as also St. Maximin near Trier on a Count Adalhard, etc. In 888 a Synod of Mainz decreed (canon xxv) that the secular abbots should place able provosts and provisors over their monasteries.

In a synod held at Trosly, in the Diocese of Soissons, in 909, sharp complaints were made (ch. iii) about the lives of monks; many convents, it was said, were governed by laymen, whose wives and children, soldiers and dogs, were housed in the precincts of the religious. To better these conditions it was necessary, the synod declared, to restore the regular abbots and abbesses; at the same time ecclesiastical canons and royal capitularies declared laymen quite devoid of authority in church affairs.

Lay abbots existed in the tenth century, also in the eleventh. Crínán of Dunkeld (d. 1045) was the lay abbot of the monastery of Dunkeld. While the title of Hereditary Lay Abbot was a feudal position that was often exercised in name only, Crinán seems to have acted as Abbot in charge of the monastery in his time. He was thus a man of high position in both clerical and secular society.

Gosfred, Duke of Aquitaine, was Abbot of the monastery of St. Hilary at Poitiers, and as such he published the decrees issued (1078) at the Synod of Poitiers. It was only through the so-called investitures conflict that the Church was freed from secular domination; the reforms brought about by the papacy put an end to the bestowal of abbeys upon laymen.

== See also ==
- Commendatory abbot
- Proprietary church
- Lay cardinal
