= Upper Burgundy =

Frankish kingdom from 888 to 933

- 888–933
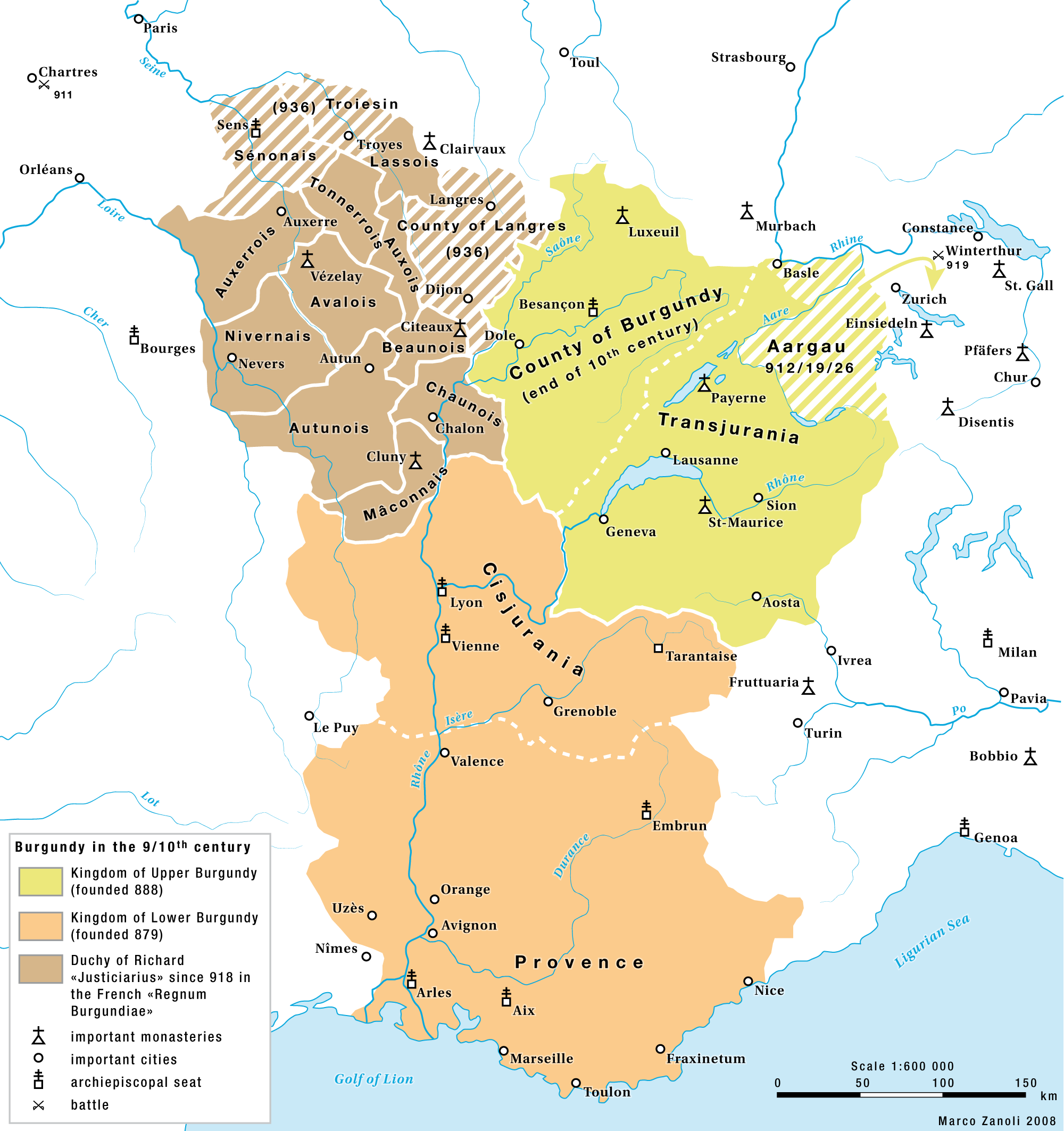
- Upper Burgundy and other Burgundian regions, at the end of 9th and the beginning of 10th century Upper Burgundy Lower Burgundy Duchy of Burgundy
- Common languages: Vulgar Latin; Old French; Old High German
- Government: Kingdom
- Historical era: Early Medieval
  - Established: 888
  - Disestablished: 933
Preceded by	Succeeded by
Carolingian Empire	Kingdom of Arles

Upper Burgundy (Latin: Burgundia superior; French: Bourgogne supérieure) was a historical region in the early medieval Burgundy, and a distinctive realm known as the Kingdom of Upper Burgundy, that existed from 888 to 933, when it was incorporated into the reunited Kingdom of Burgundy, that lasted until 1032. During those periods, the region of Upper Burgundy was encompassing the entire Juran Burgundy (French: Bourgogne jurane), including the County of Burgundy (modern region of Franche-Comté). The Kingdom of Upper Burgundy was established in 888 by the Welf king Rudolph I within the territory of former Middle Francia. Under his son and successor, king Rudolph II, Upper Burgundy was reunited with Lower Burgundy in 933 to form the Kingdom of Burgundy, that existed until 1032.

== Terminology ==
The adjective 'upper' in the name of the region designates its geographical location in the upstream sections of the Rhône river basin. That part of historical Burgundy is thus distinct from the Lower Burgundy (located further downstream), and also from the neighboring Duchy of Burgundy (located to the west of the Saône river). Upper Burgundy is also referred as Juran Burgundy, or Jurassian Burgundy, since it was encompassing regions on the both sides of the Jura Mountains. The more specific terms such as Transjuran Burgundy (fr. Bourgogne transjurane, lat. Transiurania) or Ultrajuran Burgundy are also used for all of those regions of Upper Burgundy that are located to the southeast of the Jura Mountains (Latin: trans or Latin: ultra in the sense of being located 'beyond' the Juran mountain range).

== History ==
Upper Burgundy within the Kingdom of Lotharingia, after the Treaty of Prüm (855)

Transjurania originally was a duchy of the Carolingian Empire, covering the Central Plateau from the Jura Mountains up to the Great St Bernard Pass in the Western Alps. It thereby roughly corresponded to western Switzerland, i.e. the parts west of the Brünig-Napf-Reuss line, including the Romandy with the cities of Geneva, Lausanne and Sion, as well as the cantons of Aargau, Bern and Valais and adjacent parts of the French départements Haute-Savoie and Ain, as well as the Aosta Valley which today belongs to Italy. Together with the Burgundian comital estates around Besançon and Dole on the Doubs river northwest of the Jura range, the Transjuran territories became part of the short-lived Middle Frankish realm of Emperor Lothair I upon the 843 partition by the Treaty of Verdun.

=== Within the Kingdom of Lotharingia ===
Upon the second partition by the Treaty of Prüm and Emperor Lothair's death in 855, his second son Lothair II subsumed his portion of Upper Burgundy into his Middle Frankish kingdom of Lotharingia, while his younger brother Charles received Cisjuran Burgundy and the Kingdom of Provence. When Charles died in 863, Lothair II also gained some northern districts of the deceased's kingdom. The Provence territory in the south passed to the eldest brother King Louis II of Italy.

The Transjuran duchy was then ruled by Hucbert, a scion of the Bosonid dynasty, the younger son of Count Boso the Elder of Arles, and through his sister Teutberga brother-in-law to King Lothair II. Hucbert, however, fell out of favour after Lothair II divorced Teutberga, was defeated at the Battle of Orbe in 864 and replaced by Count Conrad II of Auxerre from the Elder House of Welf (Rudolfings), who from 866 ruled Transjurania as a margrave. When Lothair II died without heirs in 869, his Lotharingian realm was divided into a West and East Frankish part between his uncles Charles the Bald and Louis the German by the 870 Treaty of Meerssen. Upper Burgundy was to be politically close to East Francia.

=== Kingdom of Upper Burgundy ===
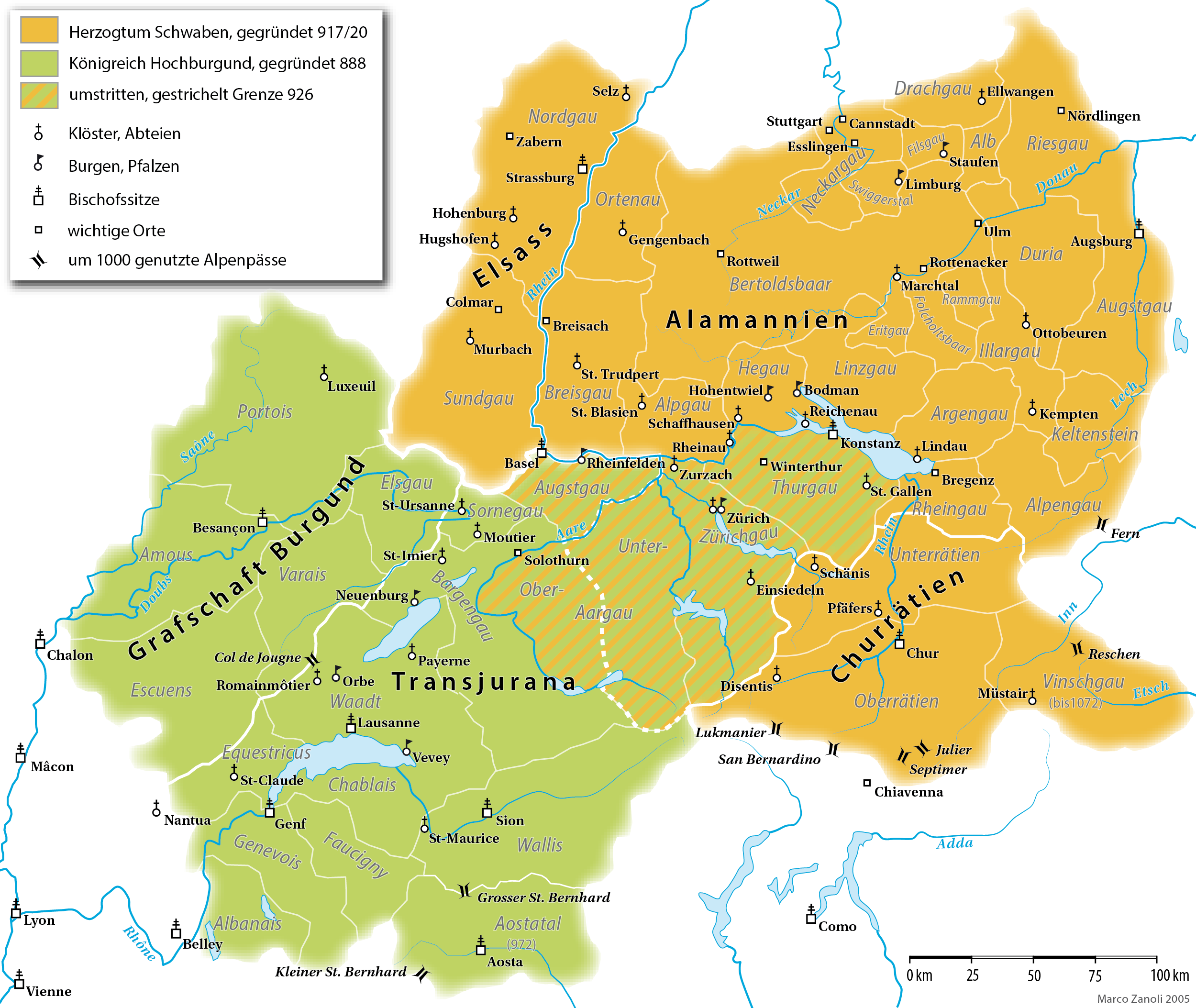
Upper Burgundy (green) and neighboring Alamannia (c. 1000)

Emperor Charles the Fat, son of Louis the German, by 884 had once again reunited all Carolingian territories, except for the Lower Burgundian Kingdom of Provence established by Boso of Vienne in 879. When Charles was deposed and died in 888, the Carolingian Empire disintegrated again. The nobles and leading clergy of Upper Burgundy assembled at the Abbey of St. Maurice, Agaunum and elected and crowned the Transjuran margrave Rudolph I as King, thus creating a distinctive realm, centered on upper Burgundy.

At first, King Rudolph I tried to re-unite the Lotharingian realm of late Lothair II, but strong opposition by the East Frankish king Arnulf of Carinthia forced him to focus on his territory of Transjurania and the western Franche-Comté estates. Arnulf acknowledged Rudolph's rule in Upper Burgundy, but finally declared his illegitimate son Zwentibold King of Lotharingia in 895.

Rudolph was married with Guilla of Provence (Willa), probably a daughter of the Lower Burgundian king Boso. After his death in 912, he was succeeded by his son Rudolph II. His widow secondly married Count Hugh of Arles, who succeeded as King of Lower Burgundy in 924.

Rudolph II attempted to enlarge his realm by attacking the adjacent territories of the German stem duchy of Swabia in the northwest. He advanced towards the Upper Rhine river and in 916 occupied the city of Basel. However, he again lost the Swabian estates of Thurgau and Zürichgau when he was defeated by the forces of Duke Burchard II in the 919 Battle of Winterthur. To make peace, he married Burchard's daughter Bertha.

From this point, Rudolph II began to campaign in the Kingdom of Italy, allied with the rebellious margrave Adalbert I of Ivrea and defeated Emperor Berengar I at Fiorenzuola in 923. The next year, he was crowned Italian king. His rule was, however, contested by insurgent nobles, and they summoned his stepfather, the Lower Burgundian king Hugh of Arles, who marched against Italy. In the tense situation, Rudolph's father-in-law Duke Burchard II of Swabia hurried to help, but was killed at Novara by the henchmen of Archbishop Lambert of Milan. Hugh had Rudolph expelled from Italy and gained the Iron Crown of Lombardy at Pavia in 926.

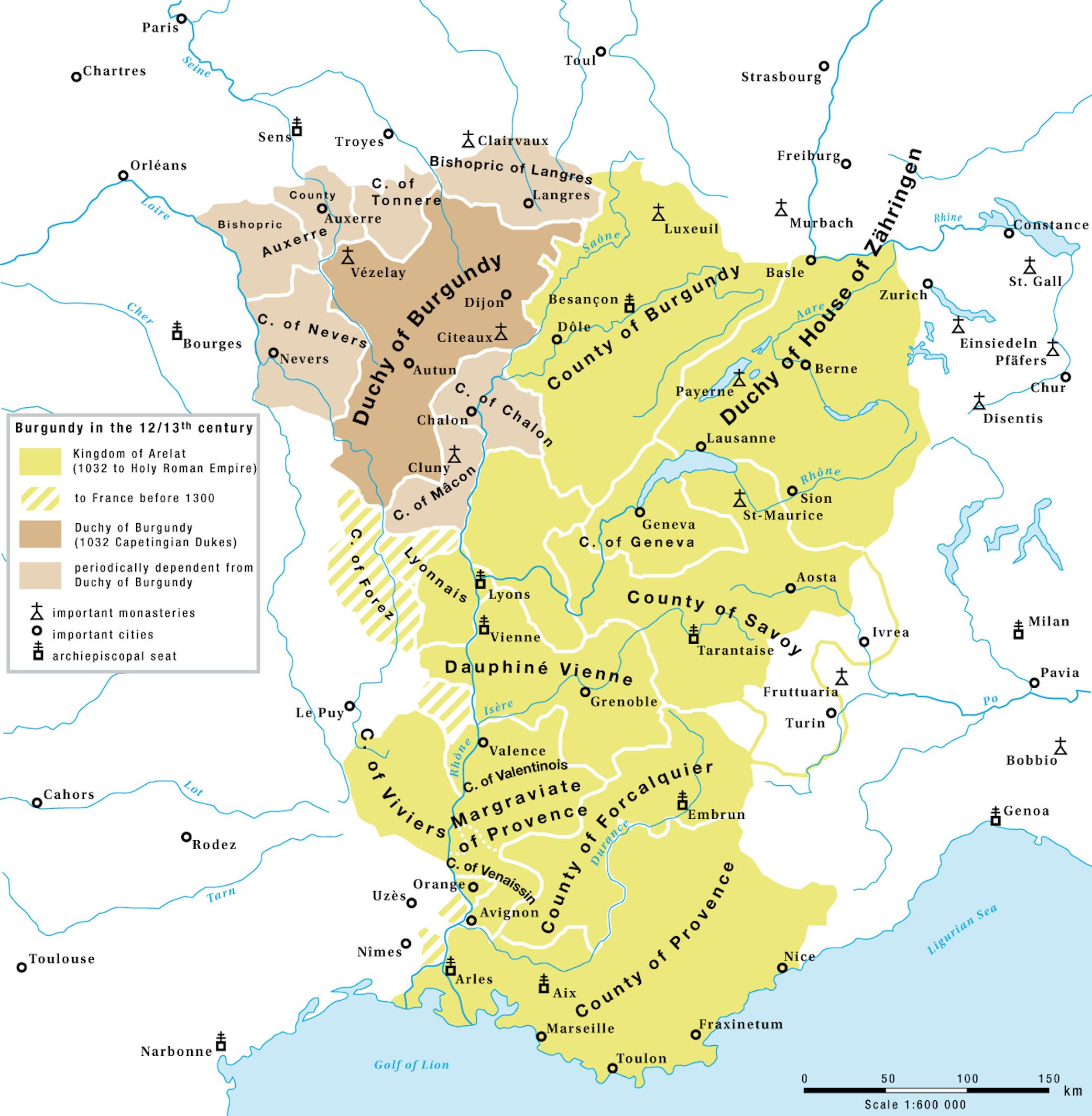
Burgundian lands about 1200 Imperial Kingdom of Burgundy-Arles Duchy of Burgundy

In 933 Rudolph II finally came to terms with Hugh: he waived all claims to Italy and in return gained Hugh's Lower Burgundian kingdom, thus re-uniting the two territories. Rudolph's descendants from the Elder House of Welf, Conrad the Peaceful (937–993) and Rudolph III (993–1032), succeeded him in this united Kingdom of Burgundy. By 982, western regions of Upper Burgundy were organized as the County of Burgundy, that later became known as the Free County (Franche-Comté).

Upon the extinction of the Welf line in 1032, Burgundy was incorporated by Emperor Conrad II as the third constituent kingdom of the Holy Roman Empire, after Germany and Italy, having defied claims raised by Count Odo II of Blois. Thereupon the King of the Romans and Holy Roman Emperor assumed the title of a Burgundian king. The title of a Burgundian 'rectorate', referring to the former Transjuranian margraviate, was re-created for the Swabian ducal House of Zähringen by King Lothair II of Germany in 1127.

== Rulers of Upper Burgundy ==
- Hucbert (?–864)
- Conrad II, Duke of Transjurane Burgundy (864–876)
- Rudolph I of Burgundy (876–912), king from 888
- Rudolph II of Burgundy (912–937), also King of Lower Burgundy from 933
- Conrad I of Burgundy (937–993), also King of Lower Burgundy
- Rudolph III of Burgundy (993–1032), also King of Lower Burgundy

Line extinct, Burgundian kingdom united with the Holy Roman Empire

== See also ==
- Burgundy (disambiguation)
- Kingdom of Burgundy
- Duchy of Burgundy

== Sources ==
- Bouchard, Constance B. (1987). Sword, Miter, and Cloister: Nobility and the Church in Burgundy, 980-1198. Ithaca and London: Cornell University Press. ISBN 0-8014-7526-0.
- Bouchard, Constance B. (1988). "The Bosonids or Rising to Power in the Late Carolingian Age". French Historical Studies. 15 (3): 407–431. doi:10.2307/286367. JSTOR 286367.
- Bouchard, Constance B. (1999). "Burgundy and Provence, 879–1032". The New Cambridge Medieval History. Vol. 3. Cambridge: Cambridge University Press. pp. 328–345. ISBN 978-0-521-36447-8.
- Hauff, Andrea (2017). "The Kingdom of Upper Burgundy and the East Frankish Kingdom at the beginning of the 10th century". History Compass. 15 (8) e12396: 1–12. doi:10.1111/hic3.12396.
- Hauff, Andrea (2018). "Carolingian Traditions and New Beginnings: The Coronation of Rudolph I of Upper Burgundy". Bulletin du centre d'études médiévales d'Auxerre. 22 (1): 1–13. Archived from the original on 2023-11-18.
- MacLean, Simon (2001). "The Carolingian response to the revolt of Boso, 879–887". French Historical Studies. 10 (1): 21–48. doi:10.1111/1468-0254.00078.
- MacLean, Simon (2003). Kingship and Politics in the Late Ninth Century: Charles the Fat and the end of the Carolingian Empire. New York: Cambridge University Press. ISBN 978-1-139-44029-5.
- McKitterick, Rosamond (1983). The Frankish Kingdoms Under the Carolingians, 751-987. Harlow: Longman. ISBN 978-0-582-49005-5.
- Riché, Pierre (1993). The Carolingians: A Family Who Forged Europe. Philadelphia: University of Pennsylvania Press. ISBN 0-8122-1342-4.
- Schneider, Jens (2018). "Spatializing Meersen: Monasteries in Jurassian Burgundy (6th-9th c.)". Bulletin du centre d'études médiévales d'Auxerre. 22 (1): 1–20. Archived from the original on 2025-05-31.
- West, Charles (2023). The Fall of a Carolingian Kingdom: Lotharingia, 855–869. Toronto: University of Toronto Press. ISBN 978-1-4875-4518-5.
