= Janet Nelson =

British historian (1942–2024)

Dame Janet Nelson DBE FRHistS FBA
- Nelson in 2019
- Born: Janet Laughland Muir; 28 March 1942; Blackpool, Lancashire, England
- Died: 14 October 2024 (aged 82)
- Other name: Jinty Nelson
- Spouse: Howard Nelson (m. 1965; div. 2010)
- Children: 2

Academic background
- Education: Newnham College, Cambridge
- Thesis: Rituals of Royal Inauguration in Early Medieval Europe (1967)
- Doctoral advisor: Walter Ullmann

Academic work
- Discipline: History
- Sub-discipline: Medieval history
- Institutions: King's College London
- Doctoral students: Alex Burghart; Paul Fouracre; Sarah Hamilton; Alice Rio
- Main interests: Medieval kingship

Dame Janet Laughland Nelson (née Muir; 28 March 1942 – 14 October 2024), also known as Jinty Nelson, was a British historian and professor of medieval history at King's College London.

== Early life and education ==
Janet Muir was born on 28 March 1942 in Blackpool, Lancashire, the daughter of William Wilson Muir and Elizabeth Barnes Muir (née Laughland). She had a sister, Christine. She was educated at Keswick School, Cumbria, and at Newnham College, Cambridge, where she received her BA degree in 1964. She studied for a PhD under Professor Walter Ullmann on early medieval inauguration ritual, which was presented in 1967. Ullman did not approve of the way Nelson's thesis turned out, and their relationship was fraught for some time afterward. After they were no longer on speaking terms, Ullman reportedly told a fellow scholar who praised Nelson's work, "do not speak to me of that girl!".

== Career ==
After working briefly in the Foreign Office, Nelson was appointed a lecturer at King's College, London, in 1970, promoted to Reader in 1987, to Professor in 1993, and Director of the Centre for Late Antique and Medieval Studies in 1994, retiring in 2007.

Although Nelson had studied under Ullmann, in 1977 she published an article critiquing his work, which she saw as overly sympathetic to the Carolingian Empire's administrative bureaucracy. Instead, Nelson argued that Ullman had overestimated the Empire's ability or sophistication to reform itself as he had earlier proposed, thereby casting doubt on the decisiveness of the Carolingian Renaissance. She returned to the topic over her career, and while—in Paul Fouracre's words—"coming to appreciate the coherence of Carolingian thought, she also recognised that much of it was rhetorical".

Elected a Fellow of the Royal Historical Society in 1979, Nelson was appointed the Society's first female President in 2001. Her first biography, in 1992, was of the 9th-century Frankish King, Charles the Bald. She was President of the Ecclesiastical History Society (1993–94) and was a Vice-President of the British Academy (2000–01), which she had been elected to in 1996. In 2013 she gave the British Academy's Raleigh Lecture on History. The Jinty Nelson Award for Inspirational Teaching & Supervision in History was established by the Royal Historical Society in January 2018.

Nelson's research focused on early medieval Europe, including Anglo-Saxon England. She published widely on kingship, government, political ideas, religion and ritual, and increasingly on women and gender during this period. From 2000 to 2010 she co-directed, with Simon Keynes (of Cambridge University), the AHRC-funded project Prosopography of Anglo-Saxon England.

Nelson published over 140 papers—half of which were gathered into four volumes of collected essays—as well as book-reviews. She co-founded and co-edited, with Rosemary Horrox, the translation-series Manchester Medieval Sources from 1991 until 2009, and from 2011 was co-editor, with Henrietta Leyser, of The Oxford History of Medieval Europe.

Nelson's last book King and Emperor, a biography of Charlemagne, was published in 2019. Reviewing the book for the Financial Times, historian David Bates said, "Rigorous assessments of difficult evidence are mixed with what feels like invitations to conversation. Their effect is to transport readers away from the eighth and ninth centuries to the 21st — and into quite a few others as well — demonstrating the effectiveness of biography as a means to understand a seemingly remote age, a subject on which Nelson reflects insightfully."

Explaining her approach, Nelson said: ".. my research has centred on early medieval European themes: politics and ritual, women's history and gender, ecclesiastical, social and cultural history. As my publications suggest, I tend to stick to choices, once made. My preferred genres are articles rather than books, collaborative and interdisciplinary projects rather than solo ones."

== Personal life and death ==
In 1965 Muir married the anthropologist Howard Nelson, who specialised in Chinese culture, whom she had met at Cambridge. They had two children before divorcing in 2010. Nelson was a long-time member of the Campaign for Nuclear Disarmament and a supporter of the Labour Party.

Nelson had Alzheimer's disease in her final years, and died on 14 October 2024, at the age of 82. King's College London published a tribute, describing Nelson as "an immensely important figure in the department, and at King's more generally.

== Honours and awards ==
Nelson was appointed a Dame Commander of the Order of the British Empire (DBE) in the 2006 Birthday Honours and held honorary doctorates from the Universities of East Anglia (2004), St Andrews (2007), Queen's University Belfast (2009), York (2010), Liverpool (2010) and Nottingham (2010).

Nelson's book King and Emperor, a New Life of Charlemagne was awarded "History Book of The Year for 2019" by The Daily Telegraph and the BBC.

== Works ==
- —— (2019). King and Emperor: A New Life of Charlemagne. University of California Press. ISBN 978-0520-3142-07.
- ——; Kempf, D., eds. (2015). Reading the Bible in the Middle Ages. Bloomsbury Publishing. ISBN 978-1474-2457-39.
- —— (2007). Courts, Elites and Gendered Power in the Early Middle Ages. Aldershot: Routledge. ISBN 978-0754-6593-34.
- ——; Wormald, D., eds. (2007). Lay Intellectuals in the Carolingian World. Cambridge: Cambridge University Press. ISBN 978-0521-8345-37.
- ——; Reuter, Timothy, eds. (2007). Medieval Politics and Modern Mentalities. Cambridge: Cambridge University Press. ISBN 978-0511-4972-16.
- ——; Linehan, P., eds. (2003). The Medieval World. London: Psychology Press. ISBN 978-1138-8486-89.
- ——; Stafford, P.; Martindale, J., eds. (2001). Law, Laity and Solidarities: Essays in Honour of Susan Reynolds. Manchester: Manchester University Press. ISBN 978-0719-0583-63.
- ——; Theuws, F., eds. (2000). Rituals of Power from Late Antiquity to the Early Middle Ages. Leiden: Brill. ISBN 978-9004-1090-25.
- —— (1999). Rulers and Ruling Families in Earlier Medieval Europe. London: Routledge. ISBN 978-0860-7880-27.
- —— (1996). The Frankish World, 750–900. London: A&C Black. ISBN 978-1852-8510-57.
- —— (1992). Charles the Bald. London: Routledge. ISBN 978-0582-0558-41.
- —— (1991). The Annals of St-Bertin. Manchester: Manchester University Press. ISBN 978-0719-0342-51.
- —— (1986). Politics and Ritual in Early Medieval Europe. London: Bloomsbury. ISBN 978-0907-6285-90.

== Television ==
Nelson appeared on BBC television and radio, notably as an expert on Michael Wood's 2013 BBC TV series King Alfred and the Anglo Saxons.

Professional and academic associations
Preceded by David Loades	President of the Ecclesiastical History Society; 1993–1994	Succeeded by David M. Thompson
Preceded by P. J. Marshall	President of the Royal Historical Society; 2001–2005	Succeeded by Martin Daunton
