= Carolingian civil war =

840–843 European succession crisis

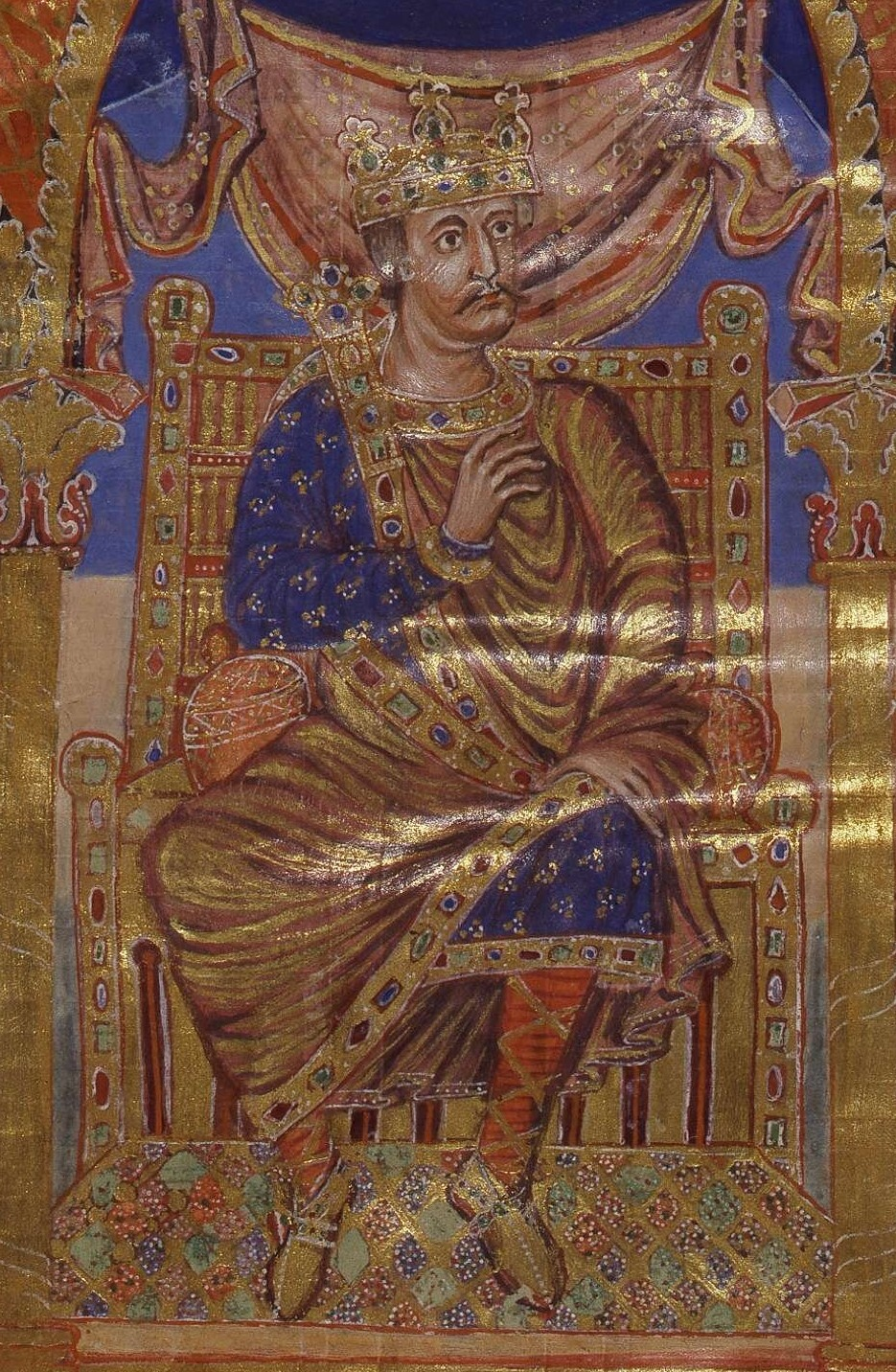
Charles the Bald
(Codex Aureus, 870)

Lothar I
(Evangeliary, 849–851)

Louis the German
(Martyrology, c. 855)

The three main competitors during the civil war. Lothar and Louis were full brothers, Charles their half-brother. They divided the empire between themselves at the war's conclusion.

The Carolingian civil war was a violent crisis over the succession to the Carolingian Empire following the death of Emperor Louis the Pious in June 840 and lasting until the Treaty of Verdun in August 843. Louis's eldest son, the emperor Lothar I, laid claim to an undivided empire, while his younger brothers Louis the German and Charles the Bald sought large kingdoms of their own on the basis of previous divisions planned by the late emperor. Their nephew, Pippin II, laid claim to Aquitaine.

After Louis the Pious's death, Lothar moved immediately to disregard the division of the empire and secure for himself his father's imperial position. He reached out to Pippin in Aquitaine for support against Charles. Not content with Bavaria alone, Louis the German occupied the Rhineland laying claim to all of Germania. The first military move of the budding civil war was Lothar's campaign that forced Louis from the Rhineland in August. It increased Lothar's prestige in the east, but ended in an armistice. Lothar then marched to the Seine in September, laying claim to Neustria, before reaching a truce with Charles.

The climax of the war was the spring of 841. Charles crossed the Seine and Lothar crossed the Rhine. After forcing Louis to retreat, Lothar turned to face Charles. On 13 May, while Charles and Lothar were manoeuvring, Louis defeated Lothar's occupying army in Alemannia at the battle of the Ries. He joined up with Charles in early June. At the same time, reinforcements from Aquitaine arrived in both camps. The battle of Fontenoy took place on 25 June. Lothar and Pippin were routed, but the battle was not decisive.

In August 841, Lothar attempted to cross the Rhine but was turned back by Louis. Charles invaded Aquitaine before reoccupying the lands east of the Seine. Lothar quickly reoccupied them, forcing Charles back beyond the Seine, but was unable to recreate the support in West Francia that he had formerly had. In early 842, Louis crossed the Rhine. He and Charles swore the Oaths of Strasbourg on 14 February before marching north. They met Lothar's army on the banks of the Moselle in March 842. Lothar retreated towards Burgundy, conceding the imperial capital of Aachen.

Following their success, Louis and Charles divided the empire between themselves, leaving Lothar only Italy. This prompted Lothar to seek a negotiated settlement. By June 842, a new tripartite division had been agreed in principle. During the subsequent truce, Charles took control of Aquitaine and Louis crushed a rebellion in Saxony, which Lothar had supported. The final negotiations, begun by 120 commissioners drawn from all sides in October, were delayed by the need to formally describe and inventory the empire. This was completed in July 843. In August, the three brothers signed the Treaty of Verdun ending the war.

== Background ==
Beginning in 830, the reign of Louis the Pious was troubled by a series of revolts involving his sons. The first began in February 830, when the army mutinied on the eve of a campaign against Brittany. Lothar, ruling Italy, and his brother, King Pippin I of Aquitaine, sided with the rebellious nobles. Pippin deposed Louis during a meeting at Compiègne and imprisoned Louis's second wife, Judith, the mother of Charles the Bald. Lothar left Italy to take charge, but the rebellion had collapsed by February 831. In the end, all were forgiven.

The second rebellion broke out in 833, spurred by Louis's decision to deprive Pippin I of Aquitaine and bestow it on Charles. This time, Louis the German joined Lothar and Pippin. In the armed confrontation of the so-called Field of Lies, Louis was captured along with Judith and Charles. Lothar ruled the empire for the next ten months, until Louis the German rescued his father from captivity and restored him to his throne in February 834. Lothar, Pippin and Louis were permitted, however, to remain kings in Italy, Aquitaine and Bavaria, respectively.

In 837, the emperor created a kingdom for Charles between the Meuse and the Seine with Burgundy. In 838, he added to it a part of Neustria. When Pippin died later that year, Louis disinherited Pippin II and granted his kingdom to Charles. This was the first break from the Ordinatio Imperii of 817. In 839, a new division of the empire was made between Lothar and Charles with Louis retaining Bavaria. This prompted Louis to rebel. His father defeated him, but died shortly after.

Louis the Pious died on 20 June 840. According to Agnellus of Ravenna and Andreas of Bergamo, celestial portents presaged Louis the Pious's death. The former reports the division of the empire, but remarks that "with Louis dead, there was always war between the brothers, or there was but unstable peace." Andreas records that "dissension arose among these three brothers, with Louis and Charles on one side, and Lothar on the other."

== Initial jockeying ==
Since his father had summoned him to Worms for early July, Lothar was in Italy preparing to cross the Alps when he received news of his father's death. According to the contemporary historian Nithard, he delayed his journey in order to find out "which way things would go before he crossed the Alps". On learning that he had strong support, he laid claim to "the whole empire", disregarding the partition plan of 839. Shortly before his death, Louis the Pious had sent the imperial sceptre and crown to his eldest son. This was the basis for his claim to the whole empire. His messengers threatened death to those who resisted his claims.

According to Nithard, "men were driven by greed and terror" to support one or another brother. Nithard himself joined Charles at Bourges in July. He may even have been the messenger who brought news of the emperor's death. As a result of his support for Charles, his lands were confiscated by Lothar. Thus, his portrayal of Lothar is negative throughout. The evidence of surviving charters, however, demonstrates that in the first two years of war Lothar was the most popular brother and his claims to the empire were taken seriously. Between the death of his father and the end of 841, he issued 22 charters, half of the confirmations requested by the recipients. This compares to five and seven charters for Louis and Charles, respectively.

On learning of the emperor's death, Charles sent messengers to Lothar in July to remind him of the 839 agreement and of his responsibilities as an elder brother and godfather. In response, Lothar asked Charles to "spare" their nephew, Pippin, whom Charles regarded as a rebel, "until he [Lothar] might have a chance to speak with him", intimating support for Pippin's claims. Pippin himself moved quickly to ingratiate himself with Lothar. Already on 29 July, he issued a charter dated to "the first imperial reign-year of Lothar".

== Lothar–Louis standoff ==
Louis the German responded to the news of his father's death by gathering an army along the Rhine. Crossing the river, he marched to Worms, where he installed a garrison before proceeding to Saxony.

Lothar, meanwhile, had arrived at Strasbourg by July 24. In August, he held an assembly at Ingelheim. It was well attended by bishops from west of the Rhine, including from Charles's kingdom, but no bishops from Bavaria, Louis's stronghold, attended. The assembly agreed to the release and reinstatement of the deposed archbishop Ebbo of Reims, one of Lothar's strongest supporters.

Lothar made the first military move, launching an attack on Worms. After a skirmish, Louis's garrison withdrew. Lothar then crossed the Rhine at Mainz. There, on 13 August, he granted some fiscal land at Rémilly to the abbey of Saint Arnulf in Metz where his father was buried. Marching on Frankfurt, he was met en route by Louis, coming from Saxony with a large army. The two exchanged messages and prepared for battle. At the last moment, they reached an armistice and agreed to meet again at the same place on 11 November.

The standoff with Lothar increased Louis's prestige. He followed it up by securing the support of Alemannia, Franconia, Thuringia and Saxony. In Alemannia, he expelled the pro-Lotharian abbots of Saint Gall, Reichenau and Kempten and installed his own candidates. By February 841, he had also successfully removed Abbot Hraban from control of Fulda.

== Contest for Neustria ==
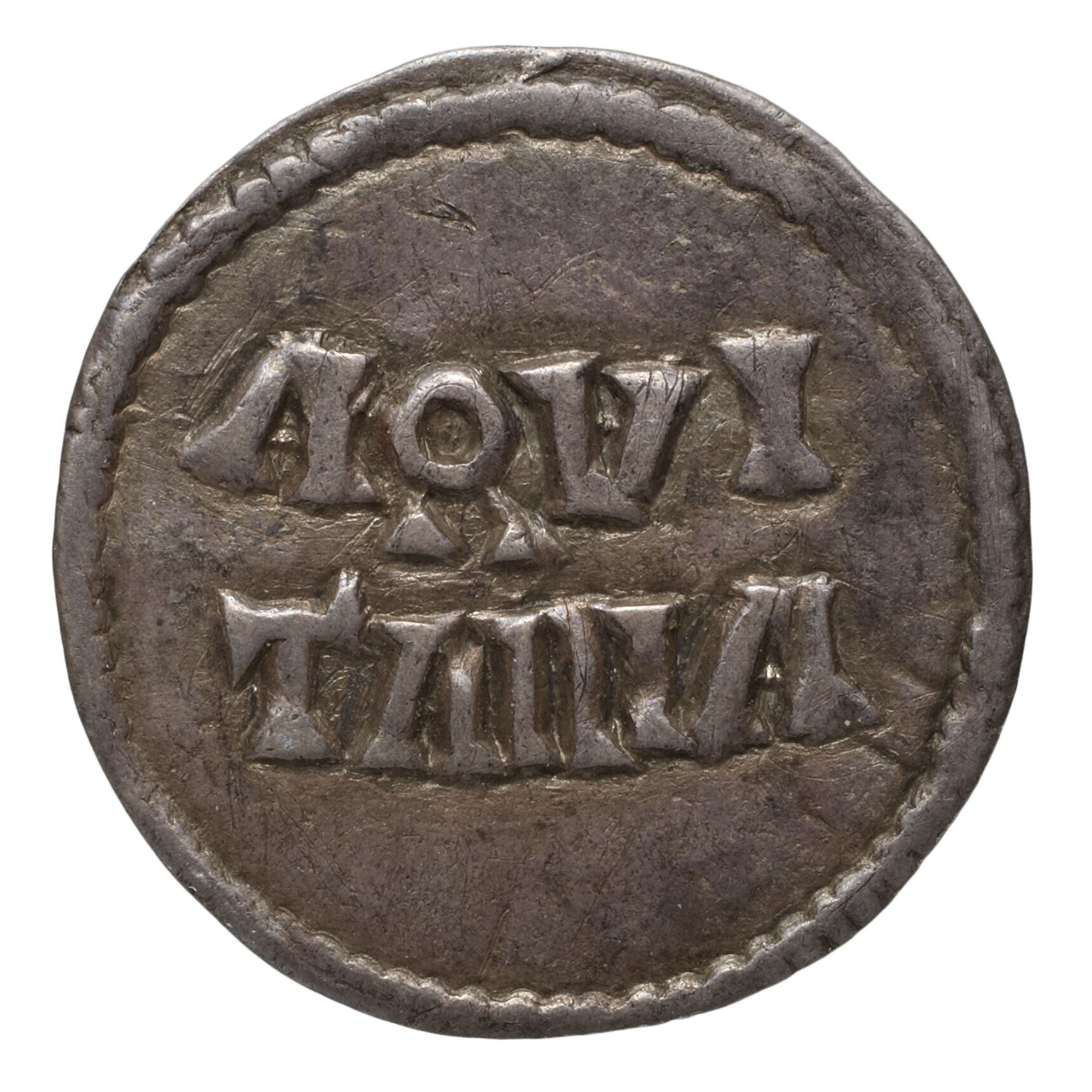
Reverse of a coin of Pippin II, which reads AQVI TANIA

Support for Lothar was high in the region between the Meuse and the Seine. At least one count, Odulf, did immediately defect. At the behest of his supporters in the region, Charles travelled from Bourges to Quierzy in August to shore up his position. He left his mother, Judith, in command at Bourges. When he was informed that Pippin II was preparing an assault on Bourges, he abruptly returned in time to surprise the Aquitanians and force their flight.

In late September, Lothar crossed the Meuse and stated his intention to reach the Seine. At this juncture, the abbot of Saint-Denis and the count of Paris threw their support to him, as did Lothar's cousin, Count Pippin of Vermandois. The monasteries of Faremoutiers, Saint-Maur-des-Fossés, Nesle-la-Reposte, Flavigny and Saint-Amand all recognized Lothar. Lothar re-established Ebbo in Reims. In October, he crossed the Seine into Neustria. His support extended into Brittany. His support was strongest on the coast and he controlled the port of Quentovic. In November, he met Charles at Orléans. Lothar agreed to a truce with Charles, which included a promise not to attack Louis. He recognized Charles's rule for the time being in Aquitaine, Septimania, Provence and a part of Neustria. The truce was to last until 8 May, when the two were to meet again at Attigny. According to Nithard, Lothar used the truce to woo supporters in Charles's realms, moving quickly towards Provence. As such, Charles's men regarded themselves as absolved of the oaths of Orléans almost immediately.

== First winter ==
When Lothar did not show up for the 11 November meeting, Louis returned to Saxony. He held an assembly in Paderborn, in defiance of its bishop, Badurad, who was with Lothar, and expelled the bishop of Osnabrück, Goswin, another supporter of Lothar. He granted an estate at Empelde confiscated from the margrave Banzleib to the abbey of Corvey, whose abbot, Warin, supported him. He refused, however, to confirm the abbey's exemption from military service, since he expected to need it.

In late 840, Pippin II was able to install his preferred candidate, Rodulf, in the archbishopric of Bourges. Charles returned to Bourges to meet Pippin in January 841, but Pippin himself did not show, sending Bernard of Septimania in his stead. Charles's men ambushed Bernard at his approach, but he managed to escape. His men were killed or captured and his baggage seized. Frightened by the affair, Bernard promised to "deliver" Pippin to Charles.

From Bourges, Charles went to Le Mans to restore Bishop Aldric. At the same time, the Breton ruler Nominoe switched his allegiance from Lothar to Charles.

== Spring 841 ==
=== Opening moves ===
In late March 841, Charles began marching from Le Mans towards Paris, although the Seine was in flood. Lothar's Neustrian supporters, Count Gerald of Paris and Archbishop Guntbold of Rouen, made preparations to prevent his crossing by destroying bridges and boats. Near Rouen, however, Charles succeeded in requisitioning 28 merchant vessels. He sent messengers ahead, declaring that he was merely making good his rights, announcing an amnesty for all who supported him now and ordering all those loyal to Lothar to leave his kingdom. He affixed the cross on which the oaths of 839 had been sworn to his prow and crossed the river on 31 March. According to Nithard, Gerald and Guntbold watched the crossing before retreating. Charles could not pursue them because of delays in getting his horses across. He visited the monasteries of Saint-Denis and Saint-Germain-des-Prés but did not or could not enter Paris.

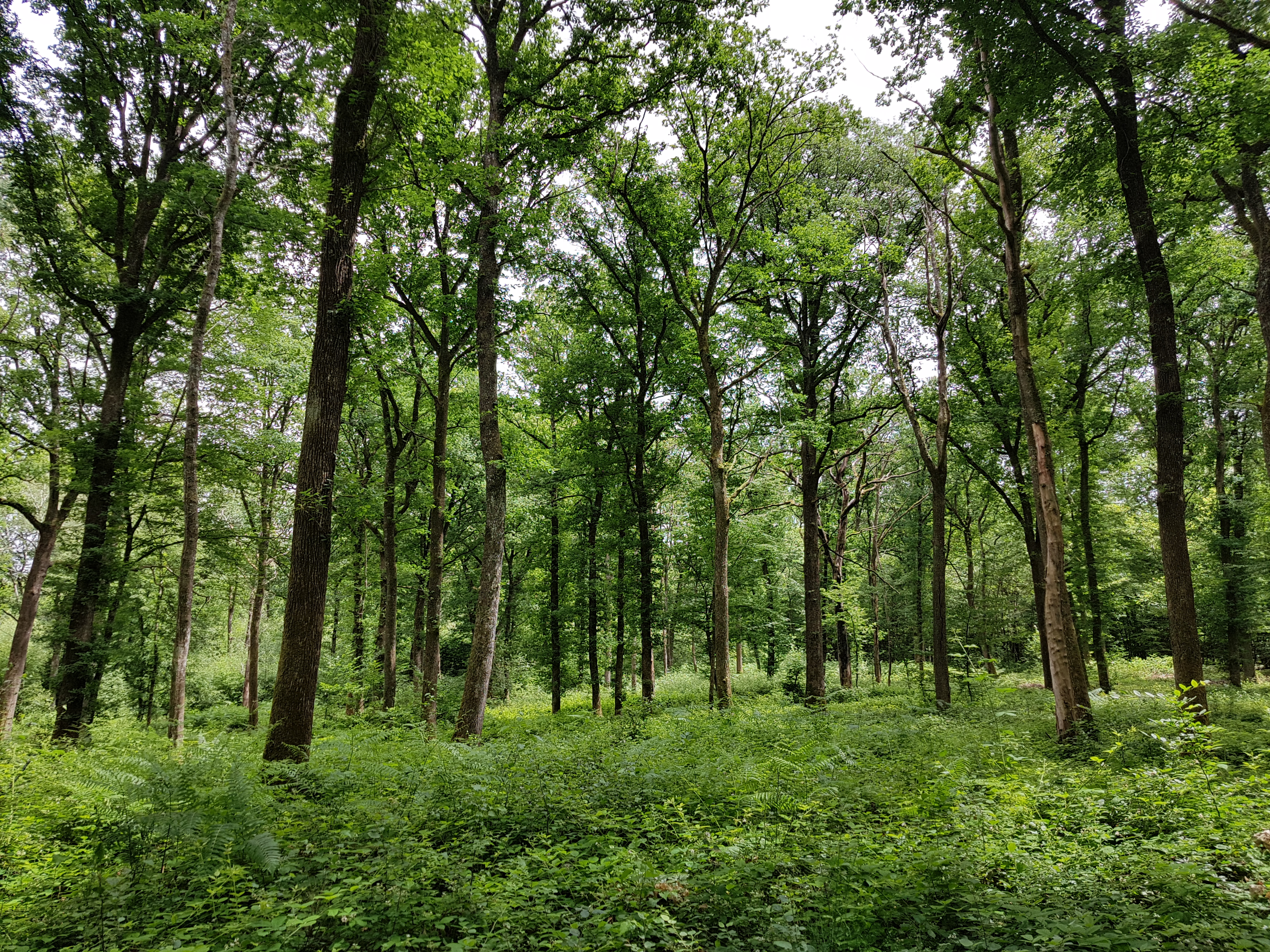
Forest of Othe, where Charles attempted to ambush the count of Paris and archbishop of Rouen in April 843

At the same time, Lothar, at the urging of Archbishop Otgar of Mainz and Count Adalbert of Metz, moved against Louis. According to Nithard, Otgar and Adalbert, who had only recently recovered from a long illness, nursed a personal hatred of Louis and wished to see him dead. Lothar managed to turn some of Louis supporters and secretly crossed the Rhine with a large army in April. Some of Louis's followers betrayed and attempted to capture him, but he escaped to Bavaria. Lothar then returned across the Rhine, leaving Adalbert in charge with the title of dux (commander) of Austrasia and ordering him to take oaths from the east Frankish nobility.

On 13 April, Charles the Bald left Sens intending to ambush Gerald and Guntbold in the Forest of Othe. They received a warning, however, and managed to escape. Having force-marched his army so far, Charles had to rest his men and animals at Troyes, where he spent Easter (15–18 April). Around the time he crossed the Seine, he informed his Aquitanian supporters of his intentions and instructed them to join him. Envoys from Judith met him at Troyes with treasure while she herself was preparing to march north with reinforcements. On 18 April at Troyes, Lothar's envoys warned Charles not to advance further, while Abbot Lupus of Ferrières urged Charles to seek "a bloodless victory". The next six weeks were characterized by manoeuvre warfare between Lothar and Charles.

=== Battle of the Ries ===
In April, Charles sent an urgent message to Louis in Bavaria. Unable with his small Bavarian army to confront head on the army of Adalbert guarding the road through Alemannia, Louis decided to cross the Danube and lead his enemies into the Ries. This was a region of small rivers and streams that flow into the Wörnitz, which in turn flows into the Danube. Louis's intention was probably to dissipate Adalbert's army in many separate river crossings, leaving him vulnerable to an ambush while buying himself time.

The armies met on Friday, 13 May. From contemporary descriptions, Adalbert crossed the Wörnitz to attack Louis. He was probably caught by surprise before his men could be ready for battle. The battle was a rout. Adalbert himself was killed in the fighting. Louis's Bavarians stripped the slain of their valuable arms and armour. Thereafter, they formed the elite nucleus of his growing army.

News of the battle of the Ries and of the death of Adalbert spread quickly. Nithard records that Charles's army rejoiced when they learned that Louis had broken out of Bavaria. Louis's march west took another three weeks and he arrived at Auxerre with his elite Bavarian army short of horses.

=== Battle of Fontenoy ===
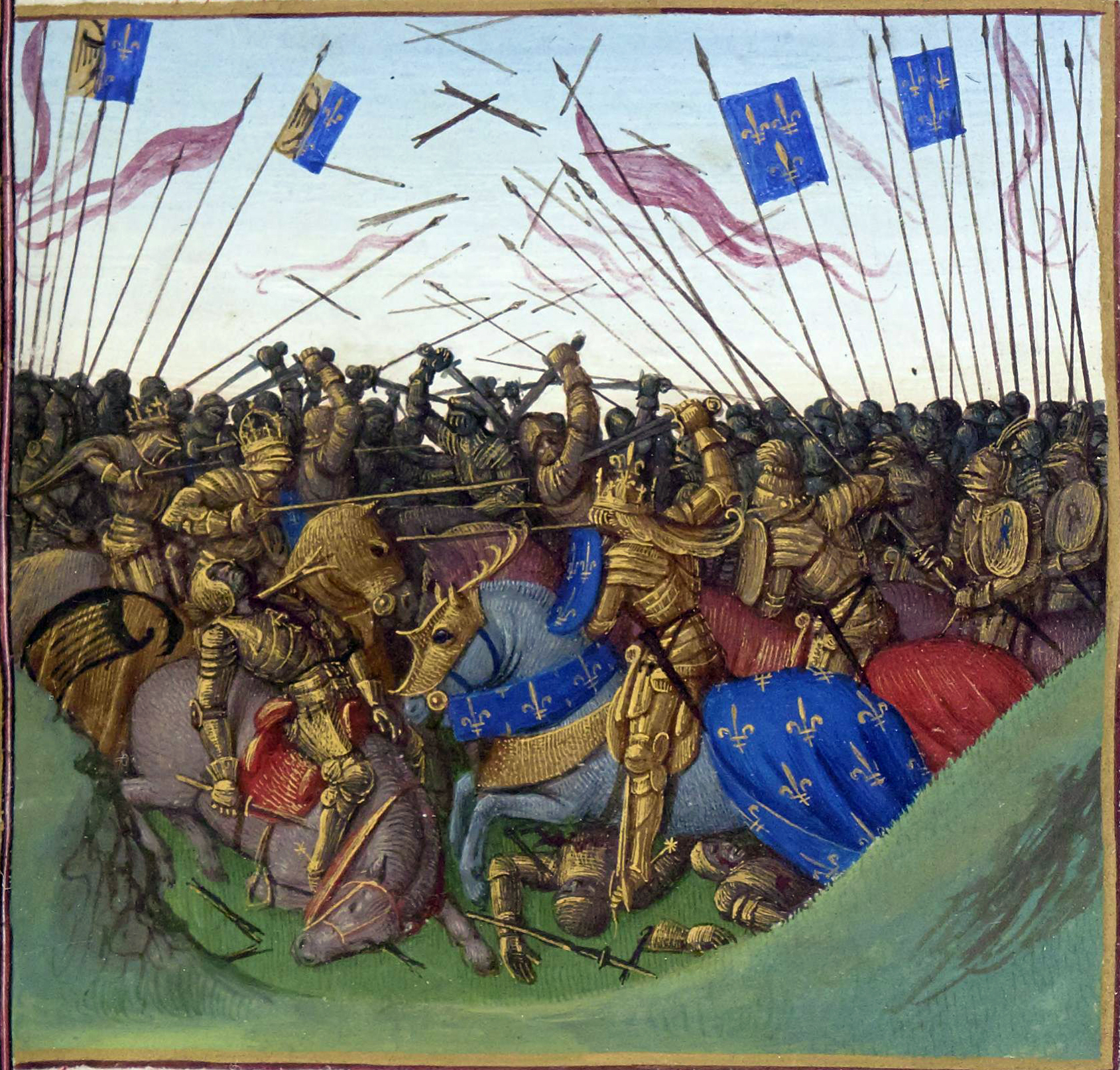
The battle of Fontenoy as depicted by Jean Fouquet in a 15th-century copy of the Grandes Chroniques de France

In June, Judith had joined Charles at Châlons with reinforcements from Aquitaine. They met up with Louis at Auxerre shortly after. On 21 June, their army and Lothar's were in sight of one another. Charles and Louis ordered fasting and prayers. On 22 June, Lothar withdrew to Fontenoy while Charles and Louis moved to Thury. They offered Lothar a division of the empire that would have given him Franconia west of the Rhine and the land between the Charbonnière Forest (roughly the river Scheldt) and the Meuse. To demonstrate their desire to avoid bloodshed, they offered Lothar all the wealth they had with them save their arms and horses.

According to Agnellus, legates sent by Pope Gregory IV "to Francia to make peace between the brothers" were in the camp of Lothar at Fontenoy. Archbishop George of Ravenna, whom Agnellus portrays as a partisan of Lothar, had accompanied them. According to both Nithard and the Annales Bertiniani, Lothar was waiting at Fontenoy for Pippin II. The feeling in his camp was confident. According to Agnellus, Archbishop George told the king that "Charles should be tonsured tomorrow", an indication that for at least some of Lothar's followers the goal was to deprive Charles of a kingdom entirely. On 23 June, Louis and Charles announced that they would celebrate the nativity of John the Baptist the following day and join battle on 25 June at eight in the morning. Pippin arrived at Fontenoy on 24 June and Lothar restated his claim to the undivided empire, rejecting Charles and Louis's ultimatum.

In the ensuing battle of Fontenoy, Lothar and Pippin were routed, although both escaped. The brunt of the fighting was taken by the Aquitanians. Bernard of Septimania, who had promised to betray Pippin to Charles, refused to enter the battle. According to Andreas of Bergamo, the devastation of the Aquitanian nobility left their lands at the mercy of Vikings. The number of fatalities on both sides was shocking to contemporaries, but the battle was not decisive. To counteract the effects of defeat, Lothar and Pippin spread rumours that Charles had been killed and Louis wounded. Bernard's son, William, joined Charles' camp at Fontenoy, completing his change of sides.

== Shoring up ==
At Fontenoy, Charles and Louis agreed to meet at Langres on 1 September. Each king then attended to regions of their own kingdoms where they were weakest. Charles chased Pippin towards Aquitaine before breaking off and turning north to occupy Paris, Soissons and Reims, forcing Ebbo into exile. He visited Attigny before returning to Paris in early September.

Louis left Fontenoy late in June heading eastward. In mid-August, he was at his palace in Salz, where he put an end to the rumour that he had been injured. In the words of the Annales Fuldenses, he cajoled the Thuringians, Alemans and Saxons into supporting him "partly through terror tactics and partly through grants of favour".

Lothar, meanwhile, was at the palace of Aachen in late July and at Mainz in late August. He crossed the Rhine but was quickly turned back by Louis. Leaving Otgar of Mainz to guard the Rhine against a crossing by Louis, he turned west and marched to the Seine, forcing Charles to retreat to Saint-Cloud on the left bank. Nithard says that Lothar's army included Saxons, Alemans and Austrasians, indicating that he still had significant support east of the Rhine. Lothar stayed at Saint-Denis before returning to Aachen. He "spent the whole winter in wasted effort", per the Annales Fuldenses, trying to reconstruct his network of support in Neustria, Brittany and Aquitaine. Fontenoy had not erased his international standing, however. On 1 September, at the request of Duke Pietro Tradonico, he issued a charter confirming Venetian property in the empire. Nevertheless, there is a clear change in Lothar's status as a result of his military defeat. Whereas before June 841 his charters are mostly responses to supplicants, thereafter they are grants to supporters.

== Strasbourg–Aachen campaign ==
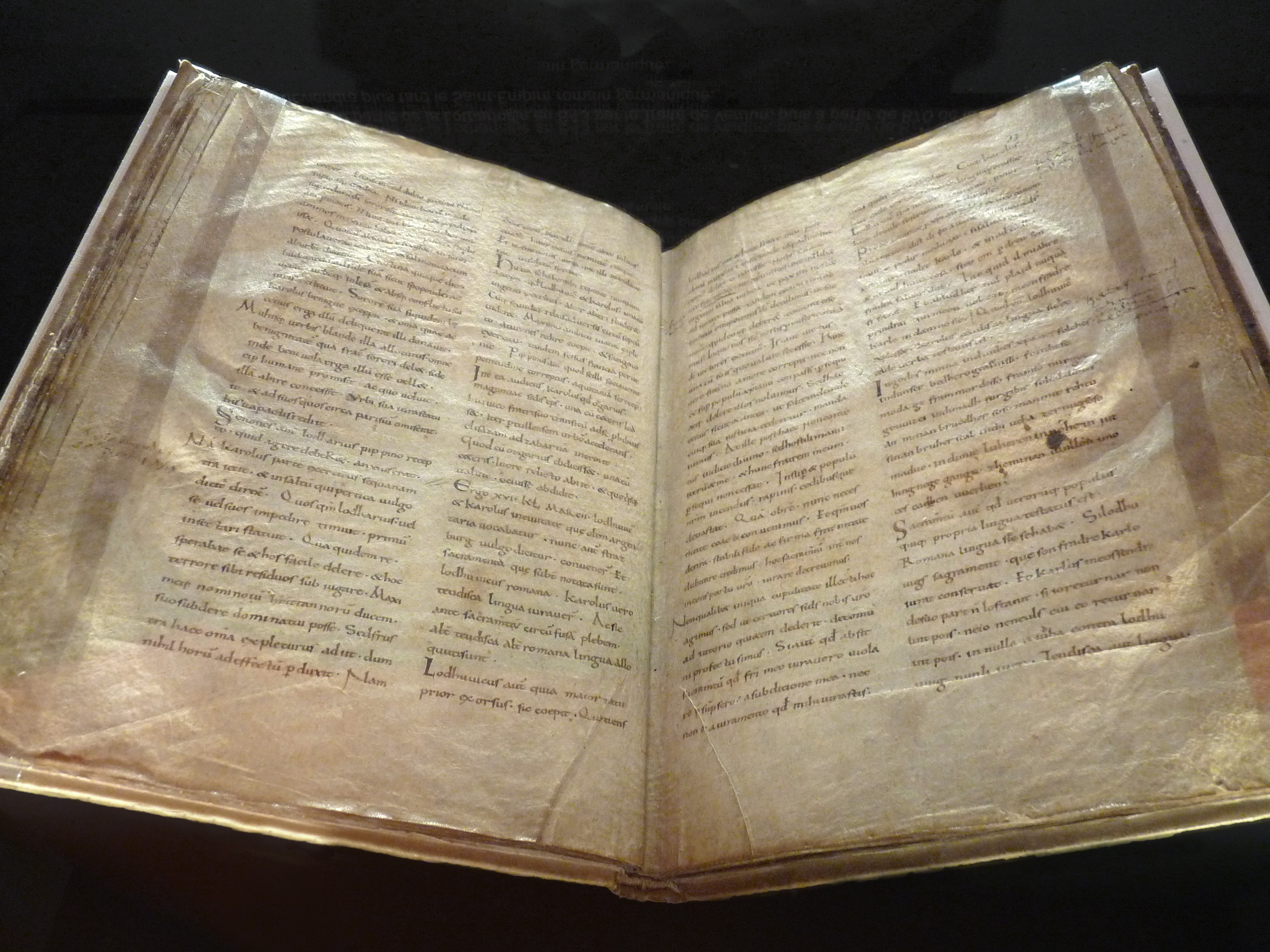
10th-century copy of the Oaths of Strasbourg

In early 842, Charles pushed back Otgar's army along the Rhine, allowing Louis to cross over. On 14 February, Louis and Charles met at Strasbourg. There they swore the famous Oaths of Strasbourg, Louis in Romance and Charles in German so that their respective armies could understand them. The armies then swore complementary oaths in their own languages. Nithard recorded the oaths in both vernaculars. The oaths committed Charles and Louis to their alliance against Lothar and committed the nobles to withdraw support for any brother who broke his oath.

After Strasbourg, Louis and Charles took the surrender of the cities of Speyer, Worms and Mainz. The Annales Xantenses accuse the armies of causing great damage in the Rhineland. At Worms, the brothers accepted the adherence of many east Frankish nobles. Bishop Drogo of Metz, their uncle and one of Lothar's staunchest supporters, surrendered. Reinforcements from Bavaria and Alemannia arrived, led nominally by Louis's eldest son, the twelve-year-old Carloman.

Armed with the Oaths of Strasbourg, Louis and Charles again sought a negotiated settlement, but were rebuffed. Lothar marched his forces from Aachen to the Moselle prepared for battle. Among his remaining supporters were Otgar of Mainz and Count Hatto of Nassau. Louis moved his forces down the Rhine by ship while Charles marched overland through the Hunsrück. The two armies joined up at Koblenz on 18 March, where they celebrated Mass in the basilica of Saint Castor. When they crossed the Moselle by ship, Lothar's forces retreated to Aachen. There he used the imperial treasure to bribe his supporters before heading southwest towards Burgundy. The Annales Bertiniani describe how he destroyed a silver table that had belonged to his grandfather, Charlemagne:

He took ... a silver plate of wonderful size and beauty. On it there shone a map of the whole world and it also showed the stars and the various movements of the planets at proportionate distances from each other, with the more important signs of the Zodiac. Lother had this great plate cut up into pieces and distributed amongst his men - who despite being induced by such a large bribe, still continued to desert in droves from every section of his army.

In late March, the allied brothers occupied Aachen. In the words of Nithard, this was "the end of Lothar's second contest". It was a relatively bloodless victory.

== Ending the war ==
=== New division ===
The ancient Charbonnière Forest, a traditional frontier between Neustria and Austrasia

In late March 842, Louis and Charles held an assembly at Aachen, incorrectly believing that Lothar had fled to Italy. The assembled bishops, accusing Lothar of lacking "the knowledge of how to govern the state" and having fled "first from the battle-field and then from his own realm", turned to the victorious brothers to "admonish, ask, and command you to receive the kingdom and rule it according to God's will". In answer to the bishops, who were acting in any case under their direction, the two kings divided the empire north of the Alps to the exclusion of Lothar. Each selected twelve men as commissioners to draw up the boundary between the kingdoms. The goal was that the kingdoms be approximately equal in size and wealth, but also that noble families (affinitas) not be divided between kingdoms.

The details of this new division have not survived and may never have been finalized. The Meuse was probably the main border. Louis certainly acquired Frisia and the city of Aachen, where he issued a charter on Palm Sunday (26 March). From Aachen, he marched to Cologne, where he took the city's submission and celebrated Easter.

Following the new division of the empire, Lothar sent messengers to his brothers to open negotiations. In the initial negotiations, Lothar was offered the region between the Rhine and the Meuse. He was subsequently able to extract the lands between the Charbonnière Forest (roughly the Scheldt) and the Meuse. An agreement was reached in principle by June 842. That month, taking advantage of the civil war, Vikings sacked Quentovic in the kingdom of Charles. They were bought off with danegeld. The brothers then agreed to a truce until 1 October, when they would meet at Metz, where their father was buried, to finalize the details.

=== Final truce ===
During the truce, Lothar shored up his support in the region between the Scheldt and the Meuse. At Trier in August 842, he granted the abbey of Mettlach to Archbishop Hetti and received an embassy from the Byzantine Empire, which was important to perceptions of his standing. His grant to Hetti seems to acknowledge that mistakes were made:

For if we shall inquire into those things which we have done against the usage of reason and divine admonition on account of [the necessity] of human affairs, and shall study with highest diligence to lead them to amendment, without doubt we do not distrust that it [will] lead to the stability of our reign...

Meanwhile, Charles crossed the Loire into Aquitaine to crush Pippin II. With a largely Burgundian army, he chased him as far as Agen by 23 August, but failed to capture him. He installed Egfrid as count of Toulouse and left Aquitaine under the command of Egfrid and Duke Warin.

Louis marched to Saxony where the Saxons peasants, calling themselves Stellinga ('comrades in arms'), had renounced Christianity and "rose up violently against their lords", in the words of the Annales Xantenses. Lothar had offered to respect the rebels' traditional rights and customs, but this had merely pushed the Saxon nobility and church towards Louis. According to the Annales Bertiniani, in the summer of 842, Louis "captured all the leaders of that unholy scheme", "punished 140 of them with beheading, hung fourteen on the gallows" and completely put an end to the Stellinga. In fact, according to Nithard, there was a second rebellion some months later that was easily crushed by the Saxon nobility without royal intervention.

=== Final negotiations ===
Division of the empire under the Treaty of Verdun

As arranged, each brother sent 40 commissioners to Metz in early October. The proximity of Lothar's palace at Thionville, however, concerned Louis and Charles, who demanded hostages for their commissioners' safety. The 120 commissioners eventually relocated to Koblenz, meeting by day in the basilica of Saint Castor and spending the nights on opposite sides of the Rhine to prevent outbreaks of violence.

Louis and Charles soon requested a delay in the proceedings so that they could make a detailed description of the empire, since they lacked complete knowledge of royal resources. Lothar objected. The question was submitted to the bishops but they could not agree. Neither could the commissioners, who made a truce until 5 November and adjourned. This truce was made "without the authority of their lords", according to Nithard. Owing to a poor harvest, however, all three kings were eager to prevent the expiration of the truce. Charles and Louis sent envoys to Lothar at Thionville, where it was agreed that a formal description of the empire be made and the division determined on that basis. Lothar would have his pick of the divisions. The deadline for the description was 14 July 843.

The description—the Latin word is descriptio—would have been produced by missi (envoys) sent throughout the empire to describe and inventory bishoprics, monasteries, royal palaces, manors, benefices and markets. No copy of it survives.

Louis the German spent the winter of 842–843 in Bavaria. In January 843, Charles the Bald campaigned in Aquitaine against Pippin II, now definitively excluded from the division. The three brothers met at Verdun in August 843. By 10 August, they had agreed to a division in the Treaty of Verdun. No written copy of this agreement survives, but the division of the empire can be reconstructed from the chroniclers' accounts.

== Poetry ==
There are two surviving Latin poems lamenting the civil war from different perspectives. Angelbert's Battle of Fontenoy is an account of the eponymous battle, in which he fought in the army of Lothar. He laments the bloodshed but praises Lothar, blaming his defeat on treachery.

Florus' Lament. The translated passage begins midway down the page: Huic etenim cessit etiam gens Romula genti ('Even the race of Romulus yielded before this people').

There has been no worse massacre on the field of battle.
Christian law is violated; blood flows in waves;
and in hell the maw of Cerberus opens with glee.
The hand of almighty God protected Lothar
who himself put up a valiant struggle.
Had the rest fought like him swift victory would have been won.
But even as Judas once betrayed the Saviour,
so, Sire, your generals abandoned you in the struggle.
Be careful lest you be deceived like the lamb before the wolf.

Florus of Lyon's Lament on the Division of the Empire is a sermonizing poem. It links the civil war to a decline in morality and ecclesiastical authority. It urges repentance and holds up the reign of Charlemagne as an exemplar.

Even the race of Romulus yielded before this people
and Rome, fine mother of kingdoms, gave place;
there the prince of this realm was crowned
by the gift of the pope, relying on Christ's protection.
O happy would that kingdom have been, had it known its good fortune,
with Rome as its capital and, as its guardian, the keeper of heaven's keys;
its immortal protector was the timeless ruler of the skies,
who can raise kingdoms on earth into the heavens.
But now that pinnacle of power, fallen from its great heights,
like a garland of flowers cast down from the head,
once splendid with the different scents of sweet-smelling herbs,
is trodden underfoot by all, stripped of its crown.
It has lost both the name and the distinction of empire,
and the united kingdom has fallen to three lots,
for there is no one at all who is recognised as emperor, a petty king
supplants a monarch, the fragments of a kingdom replace a realm.

Florus also mentions "terrible comets ... forboding disaster", one of which "shining brightly with a tail of flame, gleamed for almost an entire month with its grim light". This is probably the comet X/841 Y1 that Nithard records as visible from December 841 until February 842. According to Nithard, it disappeared after the Oaths of Strasbourg. The Annales Fuldenses record the same comet as appearing in Aquarius on Christmas Day 841.

Although Florus' perspective is different from Angelbert's, his lament of "division" may reflect a similarly pro-Lotharian sentiment.

== Bibliography ==
- Berto, Luigi Andrea, ed. (2021). Franks and Lombards in Italian Carolingian Texts: Memories of the Vanquished. Routledge.
- Deliyannis, Deborah Mauskopf, ed. (2004). Agnellus of Ravenna: The Book of the Pontiffs of the Church of Ravenna. The Catholic University of America Press.
- Gabriele, Matthew; Perry, David M. (2024). Oathbreakers: The War of Brothers That Shattered an Empire. HarperCollins.
- Godman, Peter (1985). Poetry of the Carolingian Renaissance. University of Oklahoma Press.
- Goldberg, Eric J. (2006). Struggle for Empire: Kingship and Conflict under Louis the German, 817–876. Cornell University Press.
- McKitterick, Rosamond (1983). The Frankish Kingdoms under the Carolingians, 751–987. Longman.
- Nelson, Janet L., ed. (1991). The Annals of St-Bertin. Manchester University Press.
- Nelson, Janet L. (1992). Charles the Bald. Longman.
- Nelson, Janet L. (1996). "The Search for Peace in a Time of War: The Carolingian Brüderkrieg, 840–843". Vorträge und Forschungen. 43: 87–114.
- Reuter, Timothy, ed. (1992). The Annals of Fulda. Manchester University Press.
- Scholz, Bernhard Walter, ed. (1970). Carolingian Chronicles: Royal Frankish Annals and Nithard's Histories. University of Michigan Press.
- Screen, Elina (2004). "The Importance of the Emperor: Lothar I and the Frankish Civil War, 840–843". Early Medieval Europe. 12 (1): 25–51. doi:10.1111/j.0963-9462.2003.00120.x.
- Sicoli, Piero; Cesario, Marilina; Gorelli, Roberto (2022). "Comets and Political Anxieties in the First Half of the Ninth Century: New Light on Comets X/839 B1 and X/841 Y1". Journal of Astronomical History and Heritage. 25 (2): 213–226. doi:10.3724/SP.J.1440-2807.2022.02.04.
- Smith, Julia M. H. (1992). Province and Empire: Brittany and the Carolingians. Cambridge University Press.
