= Battle of the Ries =

The battle of the Ries of 13 May 841 was a major engagement of the Carolingian civil war of 840–843. King Louis the German surprised and routed the army of Count Adalbert of Metz on the banks of the river Wörnitz in the Ries. Adalbert, who had been charged by the emperor Lothar I with preventing Louis from breaking out of Bavaria, was killed in the fighting. The victory allowed Louis to join up with King Charles the Bald and defeat Lothar in the battle of Fontenoy-en-Puisaye in late June.

== Background ==
Notice in the Grimalt Codex mentioning the battle of the Ries

The battle of the Ries is recorded in many sources: the Annales Bertiniani, Annales Fuldenses, Annales Iuvavenses and Auctarium Garstense, the Grimalt Codex, the Casus sancti Galli of Ratpert and the Historiae of Nithard.

In early 841, Lothar I forced Louis the German to retreat into Bavaria. He stationed a large army in Alemannia to block the Roman roads and prevent Louis from joining up with Charles the Bald. He placed Adalbert of Metz in charge of this army. Other counts are mentioned but not named by the Annales Fuldenses. According to Nithard, "if Louis should attempt to come to Charles, in no way should he be allowed [to do so]." Ratpert also reports Lothar's order that "Louis ought not be allowed to enter the borders of [the Alemmanians], and they ought to prevent him."

Adalbert's army was larger than Louis's and drawn from all over the empire. Louis's army was primarily composed of Bavarians and had been frequently on the move since 838. Having received an urgent message from Charles, he decided to break out of Bavaria.

== Engagement ==
Louis probably first followed the Via Istrum on the right (south) bank of the Danube towards Alemannia, where Adalbert would have guarded the road. Adalbert was probably stationed on the left (west) bank of the river Lech, a southern tributary of the Danube. Louis would have crossed the Danube and headed north on the left (east) bank of the Wörnitz, effectively leaving three major rivers between himself and Adalbert. Learning of Louis's movements, Adalbert must have crossed the Danube and headed north on the opposite bank of the Wörnitz.

The Ries contains numerous small rivers and streams that empty into the Wörnitz, which in turn flows into the Danube. Louis's intention was probably to force Adalbert to break up his army in many separate crossings, leaving him vulnerable to an ambush. This strategy is discussed in Vegetius' De re militari. The Annales Iuvavenses record that the battle took place "across the river Wörnitz" (ultra ripam Werinza). If this refers to the other side of the Wörnitz relative to Salzburg, where the annals were written, then it would seem that Louis crossed the river to surprise Adalbert. It is more likely, however, that Adalbert crossed to attack Louis.

The battle took place on Friday, 13 May. Adalbert's forces were caught by surprise. They may have been ambushed in mid-crossing. According to the Annales Bertiniani, Louis's forces charged, presumably following a volley of arrows: "Louis then hurled his men on the troops which Lothar had stationed to resist him, slew many of them and put the rest to flight." The Annales Fuldenses record that Lothar's men, "arriving at the point of the lances", turned and fled. These contemporary reports indicate that Louis opened the fighting with a cavalry charge.

According to the Annales Fuldenses, an "uncountable number of men" of Lothar were killed. Adalbert was among them.

== Aftermath ==
Louis's Bavarian army stripped the slain of their valuable arms and armour. Thereafter, they formed the elite nucleus of his growing army.

News of the battle of the Ries spread quickly. The death of Adalbert is also widely noted in the chronicles. Nithard records that Charles's army rejoiced when they learned that Louis had broken out of Bavaria. Charles was at Châlons, where he waited for over a month for Louis to arrive. The two armies probably met at Châlons in mid-June. On 25 June, they defeated the combined armies of Lothar and King Pippin II of Aquitaine in the battle of Fontenoy.

Abbot Hrabanus Maurus and his brother, Count Guntram, were among the survivors of Adalbert's army. On 20 May at the family estate of Rohrbach, Guntram ceded all his lands to the Abbey of Fulda and received back some lands west of the Rhine as precaria. These transactions were intended to prevent the confiscation of his estates by Louis.

== Bibliography ==
- Coon, Lynda L. (2011). Dark Age Bodies: Gender and Monastic Practice in the Early Medieval West. University of Pennsylvania Press.
- Flynn, Christopher Patrick (2020). "Unconquered Louis Rejoiced In Iron": Military History in East Francia under King Louis the German (c. 825–876) (PhD diss.). University of Minnesota.
- Goldberg, Eric J. (2006). Struggle for Empire: Kingship and Conflict under Louis the German, 817–876. Cornell University Press.
- Nelson, Janet, ed. (1991). The Annals of St-Bertin. Manchester University Press.
- Reuter, Timothy, ed. (1992). The Annals of Fulda. Manchester University Press.
- Scholz, Bernhard Walter, ed. (1970). Carolingian Chronicles: Royal Frankish Annals and Nithard's Histories. University of Michigan Press.
- Verbruggen, Jan Frans (1997). The Art of Warfare in Western Europe During the Middle Ages: From the Eighth Century to 1340. Translated by Sumner Willard and R. W. Southern (2nd ed.). Boydell Press.
