= George of Ravenna =

George (died 20 January 846) was the archbishop of Ravenna from about 837 until his death. He strove for autocephaly (independence from the Papacy) and sought support from the Emperor Lothar I, with whom he sided in the Carolingian civil war. He was captured at the Battle of Fontenoy in 841 but released and sent back to Ravenna. In the imperial–papal dispute of 844, he was quick to side with Lothar.

== Early pontificate ==
The main source for George's life is the Liber pontificalis ecclesiae Ravennatis of Andreas Agnellus, which he was writing during George's pontificate and after. It is not an unbiased source. Although Agnellus claims that he and George "were like brothers" before George became archbishop, their falling out leads him to "portray George in as bad a light as possible". He records one incident from their early friendship. When George was still just a priest in Classe, he helped Agnellus discover the lost tomb of Bishop Peter II there.

The biography of George is the last in the Liber and is incomplete. It is also focussed almost entirely on George's political intrigues with foreigners and has little to say about his administration of the archdiocese. George succeeded Petronax, who died in 837. Unlike Petronax, George belonged to the "antipapal faction" that sought autocephaly. According to Agnellus, George was young with curly hair and big eyes at the time of his election. He was consecrated in Rome by Pope Gregory IV. Agnellus accuses him of immediately plundering the crypts of Ravenna for treasure. and of quarrelling with his clergy. At some point before 839, he deprived Agnellus of the monastery of Saint Bartholomew "without cause" and gave it to another priest, although he was forced to give it back.

In 838, George sued a certain Bruning, a vassus dominicus (imperial vassal), over the possession of estates that George claimed belonged to the basilica of Sant'Apollinare in Classe. The record survives of the placitum (public court) held on 1 May 838 at Rovigo, through which Bruning conceded his claim to George.

Agnellus records that, on 7 May 839, the San Michele in Africisco in Ravenna was dedicated.

== Relations with Lothar ==
=== Baptism of Rotrude ===
Sometime between 837 and 839, George travelled to Pavia to stand as godfather to Rotrude, daughter of Emperor Lothar I. Agnellus accompanied him to assist in the ceremony. George paid for this privilege and brought a large amount of treasure to Pavia. Becoming a compater of Lothar created reciprocal obligations between George and the emperor. After the baptism, George said Mass in San Michele Maggiore in the presence of the royal couple—after downing a vial of wine, according to Agnellus. He also purchased baptismal vestments from the royal palace in Pavia, which were probably made in a workshop attached to the palace.

=== Battle of Fontenoy ===
According to Agnellus, after the outbreak of the civil war between Lothar and his brothers in 840, George asked Lothar to have the pope send a delegation including himself to make peace, although Agnellus denies that the pope conferred apostolic authority on George. George travelled with 300 horses loaded with treasure and with the charter of privilege granted to his predecessor, Maurus of Ravenna, hoping to have his autocephaly confirmed. Matthew Gabriele and David Perry note that it was "probably a bad idea to carry so much wealth into a war zone", but that George's presence in Lothar's camp may have been intended to impress his adversaries with the breadth of Lothar's ecclesiastical (and thus divine) support. Edward Schoolman agrees that George "had no business near the battlefield in the first place".

George and the Roman envoys were in the camp of Lothar when the Battle of Fontenoy occurred on 25 June 841. Although he would later claim that "we came to seek peace, not to bear arms against" Lothar's brother Charles the Bald, he was accused of having predicted on the eve of battle that he would bring Charles back to Ravenna a monk. The Annals of Saint-Bertin, a northern source compiled for this year by Prudentius of Troyes, claims that George took his peace mission seriously and it was Lothar who tried to coopt it: "[George] had been sent by Pope Gregory to Lothar and his brothers to arrange a peace, but he had been detained by Lothar and not allowed to go on to his brother."

In the battle, Lothar's forces were defeated. George was thrown from his horse, stripped of his vestments and led before Charles, who held him captive for three days. The treasure he had brought was looted and his priests scattered. The three Roman envoys, however, were not taken prisoner. Although Charles initially intended to impose exile on George, his mother Judith intervened for his release and he was sent back to Ravenna. Charles even had some of what could be recovered of the treasure of Ravenna returned to the church, but the privilege of Maurus and other documents were "cast into the mud and ... pierced by sharp lances". Probably only a tiny fraction of the captured wealth was ever returned, since it would have been needed to reward followers. Among the lost pieces was a crown said to have been admired by Charlemagne. The loss of the documents may have trouble George's clergy as much as or even more than the loss of wealth. Judith gave George a small silver vase out of pity. Finally, George was forced to say Mass for Charles and his army in a sign of his subjection. The Annals of Saint-Bertin, again, offer a different account than Agnellus, claiming that George, after being captured, was "sent hom with due honour". No mention is made of his loss of treasure or documents. Thomas Noble considers the Annals more reliable than Agnellus for events at Fontenoy.

== Return and death ==
The accounts of the Battle of Fontenoy found in the Italian sources—the Liber pontificalis ecclesiae Ravennatis and Andreas of Bergamo's Historia—are probably based on the eyewitness accounts of those who accompanied George. According to Agnellus, upon his return to Ravenna, George solemnly vowed not to repeat his past mistakes or to mistreat his clergy, but he soon reneged.

In 844, Pope Gregory died and the Romans elected and consecrated Pope Sergius II without the approval of the emperor, in contravention of the Constitutio Romana of 824. Lothar sent his son, Louis II, and his uncle, Archbishop Drogo of Metz, to deal with the crisis. According to the Liber pontificalis, the first Italian bishop to side with Louis and Drogo was George. He and Archbishop Angilbert II of Milan subsequently co-led the imperial delegation to Rome.

George's death was preceded by signs. The bread of Ravenna turned to mud and the communion host turned black. Agnellus claimed that these were warnings. He probably intended the dire sermon on the Olivet Discourse in chapter 166 to refer to George's episcopate. George died after a serious illness on 20 January in 846. The Ravennate clergy refused to attend his funeral. Although Agnellus presents the clergy and deacons as universally opposed to and oppressed by George, he must have had the support of some faction.

George was succeeded by Deusdedit.
