= Comet of 841–842 =

Parabolic comet

X/841 Y1 (Nithard)
- Nithard's account of the comet – stella cometis, seventh line from the top, capital S

Discovery
- Discovery date: 17 December 841

Orbital characteristics
- Observation arc: ~2 months
- Eccentricity: ~1.000
- Last perihelion: 22 December 841

Physical characteristics
- Apparent magnitude: 1.0 (841 apparition)

Comet X/841 Y1, also called the Comet of Nithard, was a comet that was visible in China and Europe between December 841 and February 842. The Japanese monk Ennin and the Frankish historian Nithard provide contemporary records of the comet from opposite ends of Eurasia. The comet is recorded in several other Chinese and European sources.

The comet appeared around the time of the winter solstice in the constellation Piscis Austrinus and it disappeared almost two months later in Camelopardalis. As its appearance coincided with a Frankish civil war, several European sources imbue it with ominous significance.

== Primary sources ==
=== Asian sources ===
The Japanese monk Ennin, during a stay in the Chinese city of Chang'an, recorded in his diary the appearance of a comet during the winter solstice festival on 17 December, noting that "several days later the comet gradually grew larger" and that "officials asked the various monasteries to read scriptures". He records that from 23 January 842, "the comet gradually disappeared". The Zoku Nihon goki mentions the appearance of the comet on 22 December and notes that it was seen again on 6 January.

Three Chinese histories—Jiu Tangshu (945), Tang Huiyao (961) and Xin Tangshu (1060)—record the appearance of a "broom star" on 22 December 841 (Huichang era). The comet appeared next to the star Fomalhaut (α Piscis Austrini) low in the southwest sky. It later moved into the constellation Shi and then the Zigong enclosure. It "went out of sight" after 56 days on 9 February 842. The comet is cataloged in the Wenxian Tongkao of Ma Duanlin.

The Dai Nihonshi, a Japanese work completed in 1715, reads: "On the sixth day in the 11th month of the eighth year of the Shōwa reign-period a comet appeared lasting until the 26th day." This gives the appearance of the comet as lasting from 22 December to 11 January, that is, from the 6th to the 26th day of the 11th month, which would mean that the comet vanished from view a month earlier in Japan than China. It is possible that the text should be corrected to say the 26th day of the 12th month, which matches the data given by Ennin.

=== European sources ===
The Frankish historian Nithard, writing his Four Books of Histories around 843, records that a comet appeared in the sky from December 841 until February 842. It disappeared after the "conference of dignitaries", that is, the meeting between Kings Charles the Bald and Louis the German whereat they swore the Oaths of Strasbourg on 14 February. Of its path, Nithard writes that it "ascended through Pisces at the center, and disappeared after the end of this meeting between the constellation which is called Lyra by some and Andromeda by others and the darker Arcturus." It is more likely that it passed through Andromeda than Lyra. Piero Sicoli, Marilina Cesario and Roberto Gorelli interpret the reference to Arcturus as indicating that the comet vanished near the north celestial pole.

While Nithard is the most detailed, several other sources from the Frankish Empire record the comet. Nithard's contemporary, Florus of Lyon, in his poem Querela de divisione imperii, mentions "terrible comets ... forboding disaster", one of which "shining brightly with a tail of flame, gleamed for almost an entire month with its grim light". This is almost certainly the same comet as reported by Nithard. The Annales Fuldenses record a comet as appearing in Aquarius on Christmas Day 841. According to the Annales Fontanellenses, the comet was visible for 37 days from 7 January to 13 February. The Annales Xantenses, written around 873, place the comet ("a star ... in the west with a longer than usual ray towards east") somewhat later, during Lent, which began on 15 February. In his Chronica from 1111, Sigebert of Gembloux, probably drawing on earlier sources, notes the appearance of a comet in Aquarius under 842.

== Interpretations ==
=== Contemporary ===
In Europe, the comet appeared during the Carolingian civil war and was viewed as an omen, an interpretation which owed much to classical writings, such as Virgil's Georgics. Nithard does not explicitly treat the comet as an omen. He notes the coincidence that the comet disappeared after the Oaths of Strasbourg but does not comment on it. In Florus' poem, the comet is clearly a portent of the division of the empire as a result of the civil war. The laconic Annales Xantenses, mostly written by a certain Gerward, juxtaposes celestial events with wordly events in such a way as to strongly imply a connection. After noting the comet of 842, the continuation of the civil war is noted.

Ennin records Chinese views of the portentous nature of comets and efforts to mitigate the danger in conjunction with the comet of 838. Of that of 841–842, he notes that scriptures were ordered to be read in the monasteries.

=== Modern ===
The X in the conventional comet name X/841 Y1 "denotes a well-documented comet that does not have enough information to allow a reliable orbital calculation". Nevertheless, Sicoli, Cesario and Gorelli have attempted to approximate its orbit. The comet appeared in the constellation Piscis Austrinus and then travelled through Aquarius, Pisces, Andromeda, Perseus and Camelopardalis, where it disappeared from view. The Chinese references to Shi cannot be synchronized with Nithard's account. Sicoli, Cesario and Gorelli reject the view that the comet entered Pegasus, preferring to read the Chinese reference to Shi as referring to the celestial longitude of the comet.

The apparent magnitude of the comet has been estimated. It was at its maximum between about 30 December and 5 January, with an apparent magnitude slightly less than 1.

No clear reference to the comet of 841–842 has been found in sources from the Islamic world. The sufyānī al-Mubarqaʿ launched a rebellion in Palestine against the Abbasid Caliphate in early 842, however, and the historian David Cook has tentatively linked his messianic movement to the appearance of the comet.

It has been suggested that the comets reported for 20 March 840 in the Xin Tangshu and for July–August 841 in the Xin Tangshu and Jiu Tangshu are erroneously catalogued doublets of the comet of 841–842.

== Bibliography ==
- Ashley, Scott (1994). "The Power of Symbols: Interpreting Portents in the Carolingian Empire". Medieval History. 4: 34–50.
- Cooijmans, Christian (2022). "Annales Fontanellenses" (PDF). Apardjón Journal for Scandinavian Studies. Special Volume 2.
- Cook, David (2000). "Messianism and Astronomical Events during the First Four Centuries of Islam". Revue des Mondes Musulmans et de la Méditerranée. 91–94: 29–52.
- Dutton, Paul Edward (2004). Charlemagne's Mustache and Other Cultural Clusters of a Dark Age. Palgrave Macmillan.
- Godman, Peter (1985). Poetry of the Carolingian Renaissance. University of Oklahoma Press.
- Ho Peng Yoke (1962). "Ancient and Mediaeval Observations of Comets and Novae in Chinese Sources". Vistas in Astronomy. 5: 127–225. doi:10.1016/0083-6656(62)90007-7.
- Kronk, Gary W. (1999). Cometography: A Catalogue of Comets. Vol. I: Ancient–1799. Cambridge University Press.
- Pankenier, David W.; Zentao Xu; Yaotiao Jiang (2008). Archaeoastronomy in East Asia: Historical Observational Records of Comets and Meteor Showers from China, Japan, and Korea. Cambria Press.
- Reischauer, Edwin O., ed. (1955a). Ennin's Diary: The Record of a Pilgrimage to China in Search of the Law. Ronald Press.
- Reischauer, Edwin O. (1955b). Ennin's Travels in T'ang China. Ronald Press.
- Reuter, Timothy, ed. (1992). The Annals of Fulda. Manchester University Press.
- Scholz, Bernhard Walter, ed. (1970). Carolingian Chronicles: Royal Frankish Annals and Nithard's Histories. University of Michigan Press.
- Sicoli, Piero; Cesario, Marilina; Gorelli, Roberto (2022). "Comets and Political Anxieties in the First Half of the Ninth Century: New Light on Comets X/839 B1 and X/841 Y1" (PDF). Journal of Astronomical History and Heritage. 25 (2): 213–226.
