= Lambert of Nantes =

Lambert of Nantes may refer to:

- Lambert I of Nantes, Count of Nantes (818–831) and Duke of Spoleto (834–836)
- Lambert II of Nantes, Count of Nantes (843–851)
- Lambert III of Nantes, pretender to the County of Nantes (lived 830–882)
