= Hugh of Tours =

French noble

- Born: c. 765
- Died: 837; Italy
- Noble family: Etichonids
- Spouse: Ava of Morvois
- Issue: Ermengard; Adelaide; Liutfrid
- Father: Luitfrid II
- Mother: Hiltrude of Wormsgau

Hugh (or Hugo) (c. 765 – 837) was the count of Tours and Sens during the reigns of Charlemagne and Louis the Pious, until his disgrace in February 828.

Hugh had many possessions in Alsace, as well as the County of Sens. He also held the convent of Saint-Julien d'Auxerre. He appeared in 811 as an envoy or ambasciator to Constantinople with Haido, Bishop of Basel, and Aio, Duke of Friuli, to renew the Pax Nicephori. In 821, he allied himself by marriage to the royal family; his daughter Ermengard married Louis' son Lothair. In 824, he took part in an expedition in Brittany and, in 826, he accompanied the Empress Judith to the baptism of Harald Klak in Ingelheim. His other daughter, Adelaide, married Conrad I, Count of Auxerre (died 862). (Note: The Miraculis Sancti Germani records the marriage of Adheleid with Chuonradus princeps.) She was dead by 886, when Walahfrid Strabo included her epitaph in a poem of his.

In 827, Hugh, along with Matfrid of Orléans, was commissioned by Louis to recruit an army with his son Pepin I of Aquitaine and repel the invasion of the Marca Hispanica by the Moslem general Abu Marwan. Hugh and Matfrid delayed until the threat had passed. For this he was given the nickname Timidus or the Timid. Barcelona being the greatest military accomplishment of Louis' career, the Spanish March meant much to him and Hugh and Matfrid found themselves greatly disfavoured at court. They were deposed in February of the next year.

He remained very influential as the father-in-law of Lothair. He joined Matfrid in inciting Lothair to rebellion and had all his lands confiscated in Gaul. He remained highly influential in Italy, where Lothair created him "duke of Locate" (dux de Locate). He became a benefactor of the cathedral of Monza. According to the Annales Bertiniani, he and Lambert of Nantes died during an epidemic in Italy in 837. News of their deaths—and that of Wala of Corbie in an earlier Italian epidemic in the fall of the previous year—greatly distressed Louis the Pious, but the opponents of Lothair interpreted it as divine judgement.

== Sources ==
- Bouchard, Constance Brittain (1999). "Burgundy and Provence, 879-1032". In Reuter, Timothy (ed.). The New Cambridge Medieval History: Volume 3, C.900-c.1024. Vol. III. Cambridge University Press.
- Duckett, Eleanor Shipley (1962). Carolingian Portraits: A Study in the Ninth Century. The University of Michigan Press.
- Hummer, Hans J. (2005). Politics and Power in Early Medieval Europe: Alsace and the Frankish Realm, 600–1000. Cambridge University Press.
- Nelson, Janet L. (1991). The Annals of St-Bertin. Manchester: Manchester University Press.
