= Angelbert =

"Battle of Fontenoy" from MS BnF Lat. 1154

Angelbert was a Frankish soldier and poet, possibly from Aquitaine. His "Verses on the Battle that was Fought at Fontenoy" are a first-hand description of the Battle of Fontenoy of 25 June 841, in which he participated with the army of Lothair I. They are an important piece of battle literature from the twilight of the Carolingian Renaissance. Historian Bernard Bachrach has examined them as a source for the emotional effects of battle during the ninth century.

According to his poem, Angelbert fought on the front line, stationed on a hill overlooking a stream. He was the only survivor (solus de multis remani) of the men in his unit. The night after the battle is "especially terrible". The day after the battle he cannot hold back tears, but he urges the other survivors to hold them back. This battle, he says, should be forgotten: Laude pugna non est digna, nec canatur melode ("The battle does not deserve to be praised or to be the subject of fine song").

Two major streams of interpretation of Angelbert's poem exist. The first sees it as a "ballad of victory" rooted in vernacular Germanic poetry. Angelbert is assumed to have spoken Old High German, and the imagery of birds and beasts consuming the corpses of the dead has been assumed to be borrowed from Old High German literature. There is no such surviving literature with such imagery and it is supposed to have existed on analogy with Old English and Old Norse traditions of the same. The imagery is also found in other Carolingian poetry, e.g. of Radbod of Utrecht and Florus of Lyons, and it probably reflects the reality of battle, not Germanic tradition

The breaking of family bonds mentioned by Angelbert is common to the Hildebrandslied, but the themes of mistaken identity and heroic duty are absent from Angelbert and Carolingian Latin poetry in general. The "Battle of Fontenoy" also differs from vernacular Germanic literature, like the Ludwigslied, as it has much historical detail. Angelbert wrote "in order to describe the actual events of his own lifetime," which has more in common with contemporary Latin trends.

The latinity of the "Battle of Fontenoy" is learned, and it has the marks of a planctus in the Carolingian tradition. It has the interesting features of citing David's lament of the death of Saul in II Samuel (1:21), and its effect on nature, which Paulinus II of Aquileia cites in his planctus on the death in battle of Eric of Friuli. Rhythmically, the poem is an imitation of Venantius Fortunatus' Pange, lingua, gloriosi proelium certaminis. The strophes begin with the letters of the alphabet from A to P as a mnemonic device aiding recitation.

Angelbert's poem is preserved in manuscript BnF lat. 1154, originally from Saint Martial of Limoges in Aquitaine; Pippin I of Aquitaine was an ally of Lothair. The poem presents the partisan viewpoint of Lothair and Pippin's men; Florus of Lyons represents the view of the other side, of Charles the Bald and Louis the German, in his "Lament on the Division of the Empire".
