= Guntbold =

Guntbold (French: Gombaud) was the archbishop of Rouen from 836 until his death in 849.

At the start of 841, Guntbold and Count Gerald of Paris had thrown their support behind the Emperor Lothair in the civil war that was fast developing in the Frankish empire. In March 841, they moved to block Lothair's brother and rival, Charles the Bald, from crossing the flooded Seine by destroying boats and bridges. Nonetheless Charles managed to impress twenty-eight boats at Rouen and cross the Seine on March 31. Gerald appears to have had more luck preventing Charles from entering Paris.

In April 846 Guntbold headed the council convened at Trier by Pope Sergius II to resolve the disputed legality of the election of Hincmar to the Archdiocese of Reims while its previous bishop, Ebbo, was still living. When Hincmar, King Charles and the papal legates did not show, Guntbold assumed the prerogative to call another council to meet in Paris and summon Ebbo to appear there. When he did not, his deposition was confirmed.

Guntbold took part in the reformist councils of 848 in Paris and Meaux.

== Sources ==
- Fisquet, Honoré (1864). La France pontificale (Gallia Christiana): histoire chronologique et biographique...Metropole de Rouen: Rouen (in French). Paris: Étienne Repos. pp. 44–46.
- McKeon, Peter R. (1974). "Archbishop Ebbo of Reims (816–835): A Study in the Carolingian Empire and Church". Church History. 43 (4): 437–47. doi:10.2307/3164920.
- Nelson, J. L. (1985). "Public Histories and Private History in the Work of Nithard". Speculum. 60 (2): 251–93. doi:10.2307/2846472.
- Nelson, J. L. (1992). Charles the Bald. London: Longman.
