= Ermengarde of Tours =

Carolingian empress from 821 to 851

Empress of the Carolingian Empire
- Tenure: October 821 – 20 Mar 851

Queen consort of Italy
- Tenure: October 821 – 20 Mar 851

Queen consort of Middle Francia
- Tenure: August 843 – 20 Mar 851
- Born: c. 810
- Died: 20 March 851 (aged 40-41); Erstein, France
- Spouse: Lothair I
- Issue: Louis II of Italy; Helletrud; Bertha; Ermengarde; Gisla; Lothair II; Rotrud; Charles of Provence
- House: Etichonids
- Father: Hugh of Tours
- Mother: Ava of Morvois

Ermengarde of Tours (c. 810 – 20 March 851) was a Carolingian Empress consort and queen of Italy. She was the daughter of Hugh of Tours and Ava of Morvois.

== Marriage and issue ==
In October 821 in Thionville, Ermengarde married the Carolingian Emperor Lothair I of the Franks (795–855).

Ermengarde used her bridal gift to found the abbey Erstein in the Elsass, in which she is buried. Ermengarde died in 851.

Lothair and Ermengarde had:

- Louis II of Italy
- Helletrud (Hiltrud) (c. 826–after 865/866) m. Count Berengar (d. before 865/866)
- Bertha (c. 830–after 7 May 852, probably 877), became before 847 Abbess of Avenay, perhaps Äbtissin of Faremoutiers
- A daughter of unknown name (b. probably 826/830), called Ermengarde in later sources, kidnapped 846 by Gilbert, Count of the Maasgau, who then married her
- Gisla (c. 830–860) 851–860 Abbess of San Salvatore in Brescia
- Lothair II
- Rotrud (baptized 835/840 in Pavia) m. around 850/851 Lambert, Margrave of Brittany, Count of Nantes (Widonen), who died 1 May 852
- Charles of Provence

== Appearance ==
The contemporary poet Sedulius Scottus wrote "Men despise the zither's harmonious music whenever they hear your angelic and golden voice... Your face shines like ivory and blushes like a rose, and excels the beauty of Venus and the nymphs. A dazzling crown of golden hair adorns you, and splendid topaz, as a glittering diadem... Your milk-white neck glistens with beauty, shining with the lustre of lilies or ivory. Your soft white hands dispense myriad gifts, whence they sow on earth to reap in heaven.

== Sources ==
- Bouchard, Constance Brittain (2001). Those of My Blood: Creating Noble Families in Medieval Francia. University of Pennsylvania Press.102
- Heidecker, Karl (2010). The Divorce of Lothar II: Christian Marriage and Political Power in the Carolingian World. Translated by Guest, Tanis M. Cornell University Press.
- Riche, Pierre (1993). The Carolingians:A Family who forged Europe. Translated by Allen, Michael Idomir. University of Pennsylvania Press.

Royal titles
Preceded by Luitgard	Queen consort of Italy; 821–851	Succeeded by Engelberga
Preceded by Judith of Bavaria	Queen of Middle Francia; 843–851	Succeeded by Engelberga
Preceded by Judith of Bavaria	Carolingian empress 821–851	Succeeded by Engelberga
