= Rotruda (daughter of Lothair I) =

9th-century Carolingian princess

Rotruda (also Rotrude, Ruotrud or Rotrudis) was the daughter of the Emperor Lothair I and Empress Ermengarde. She was baptized sometime between 837 and 839. An account of her baptism is provided by a participant, Andreas Agnellus, who assisted Archbishop George of Ravenna. According to him, George paid Lothair for the privilege of sponsoring Rotruda as godfather at her baptism and becoming Lothair's compater, a spiritual co-father connected to the emperor by reciprocal obligations. The ceremony took place in San Michele Maggiore in Pavia and the baptismal vestments were purchased from the royal palace. Agnellus describes how George

received the daughter of the said emperor, by the name of Rotruda, whom he handed to me, and with my hands I clothed her and decorated her feet with shoes ornate with gold and jacinth, and afterward he celebrated mass for the emperor. Likewise, the Empress Ermengard, attended by her maids, wearing a shining robe, surrounded by a gold fringe, hair bound with fillets, with blue gems, her face veiled, her appearance dripping with sard, emeralds, and gold.

According to Deborah Deliyannis, nothing else is known of Rotruda beyond what Agnellus writes. She is not mentioned in any other narrative source. She may be the Rotruda listed with other women of Lothair II's family in the Liber memorialis of Remiremont sometime after 861. She would have been Lothair II's sister. In 889, the Emperor Arnulf made a donation to the abbey of Saint-Arnould at the request of his relative, Rotruda, and a certain Otto. This may be Lothair I's daughter and Otto her husband. According to another theory, she was the mother of Count Witbert, who in 870 made a donation to the abbey of Saint-Philibert de Tournus for the souls of his parents, Lambert and Rotrudis. The former has been identified as Count Lambert III of Nantes.

== Bibliography ==
- Bouchard, Constance B. (2001). Those of My Blood: Creating Noble Families in Medieval Francia. University of Pennsylvania Press.
- Brown, Tom (2020). "A Byzantine Cuckoo in the Frankish Nest? The Exarchate of Ravenna and the Kingdom of Italy in the Long Ninth Century". In Clemens Gantner; Walter Pohl (eds.). After Charlemagne: Carolingian Italy and its Rulers. Cambridge University Press. pp. 185–197.
- Deliyannis, Deborah Mauskopf, ed. (2004). Agnellus of Ravenna: The Book of the Pontiffs of the Church of Ravenna. The Catholic University of America Press.
- Gaillard, Michèle (2003). "Monastères et pouvoirs à travers les actes en Haute-Lotharingie au IX^{e} siècle et au début du X^{e} siècle". Les actes comme expression du pouvoir au Haut Moyen Âge: Actes de la Table Ronde de Nancy, 26–27 novembre 1999. Brepols. pp. 69–97.
- Hlawitschka, Eduard (1969). "Waren die Kaiser Wido und Lambert Nachkommen Karls des Grosses?". Quellen und Forschungen aus italienischen Archiven. 49: 366–388.
- Martínez Pizarro, Joaquín (1995). Writing Ravenna: The Liber Pontificalis of Andreas Agnellus. University of Michigan Press.
- Mathieu, Jean-Noël (2007). "Recherches sur Ermengarde, mère de Guillaume le Pieux, duc d'Aquitaine". Revue belge de philologie et d'histoire. 85 (3): 577–607.
- Schoolman, Edward M. (2022). "Representations of Lothar I in the Liber pontificalis Ravennatis" (PDF). In Gianmarco De Angelis; Francesco Veronese (eds.). Networks of Bishops, Networks of Texts: Manuscripts, Legal Cultures, Tools of Government in Carolingian Italy at the Time of Lothar I. Firenze University Press. pp. 111–129.
- West, Charles (2023). The Fall of a Carolingian Kingdom: Lotharingia, 855-869. University of Toronto Press.
