= Stellinga =

The Stellinga (Old Saxon for "companions, comrades") or Stellingabund (German for "Stellinga league") was a movement of Saxon frilingi (freemen) and lazzi (freedmen) between 841 and 843. These were the middle two Saxon castes, below the nobility and above the unfree. The aim of the Stellinga was to recover those rights the two castes had possessed before their forced conversion from Germanic paganism to Christianity in the 770s. At that time they had still possessed political privileges, but Charlemagne, having won over to his cause the Saxon nobility, had reduced them to mere peasants. The Stellinga thus despised the Lex Saxonum (law of the Saxons), which had been codified by Charlemagne, preferring to live in accordance with ancient and unwritten tribal custom. The movement was violently resisted by the uppermost caste, the nobiles (nobility), not always with the support of the Frankish kings.

== Saxon conditions 838–841 ==
During the civil war of 840–843 in the Carolingian Empire, between the heirs of Louis the Pious, the Stellinga had the support of Lothair I, who promised to grant them the rights they had had when formerly pagan and whom they in turn promised to support for the throne of East Francia. Saxony, on the eve of the Stelling uprising, was divided into two noble factions: the Saxons supportive of Hattonid influence (and thus of imperial unity) and the Saxones sollicitati, who were allied with Louis the German in his invasion of Alemannia in 839.

When Louis the Pious died, the German Louis deposed the Hattonid leader Banzleib from his royal offices and bestowed them on the Abbey of Corvey. Among Louis's chief supporters in Saxony were the Ecbertiner and the Bardonids. Having patronised new families and removed from power old ones, Louis the German made the Saxon aristocracy his organ of government there and forced his foes, such as Lothair, to look to the lower classes for support in Saxony.

== Uprising ==
The chief sources for the Stellinga are the Annales Xantenses, Annales Bertiniani (written by Prudentius of Troyes), Annales Fuldenses (written by Rudolf of Fulda), and the Historiae of Nithard. Gerward, author of the Annales Xantenses, wrote under the year 841 that "throughout all of Saxony the power of the slaves rose up violently against their lords. They usurped for themselves the name Stellinga . . . [a]nd the nobles of that land were violently persecuted and humiliated by the slaves." Both Nithard and the Annales Bertiniani indicate that an anti-Christian reaction was prevalent among the Stellinga.

At Speyer late in 841, Lothair and his young son Lothair II met the leaders of the Stellinga uprising, among other Saxon notables who were loyal to him. Louis the German, however, marched against the Saxon "freedmen seeking to oppress their lawful lords" and "crushed [them] ruthlessly by sentencing the ringleaders to death". The Saxon nobilies themselves disarmed the movement with a brutal action in 843.

== Historiography ==
Modern historiography has often seen parallels between the Stellinga uprising and earlier Saxon resistance to Charlemagne, the near contemporary self-defence league formed by the peasantry of the Seine basin and crushed by the nobility in 859, and the later Liutizi uprising in 983 in favour of Slavic paganism. It was the only popular revolt recorded in Europe between the sixth century, when Gregory of Tours records several riots in protest of Merovingian taxation, and the tenth century and the 983 rebellion.

The Stellinga uprising has been studied extensively and in detail by Marxist historians in East Germany. The Marxists formed two camps, those who saw the Stellinga as probably feudal dependents trying to free themselves from their obligations and those who saw them as essentially free men seeking to ward off the Feudalisierungsprozeß, the feudalisation of Germany. According to scholar Eric Goldberg, Marxist analysis has tended to ignore the simultaneous civil war in the Carolingian kingdoms and has mostly failed to explain why "exploitation" or "oppression" did not incite more revolts during the Middle Ages.

== Sources ==
- Flierman, Robert (July 13, 2017). Saxon Identities, AD 150–900. Bloomsbury Publishing. ISBN 1-350-01946-1.
- Goldberg, Eric J. (1995). "Popular Revolt, Dynastic Politics, and Aristocratic Factionalism in the Early Middle Ages: The Saxon Stellinga Reconsidered". Speculum. 70 (3): 467–501. doi:10.2307/2865267. ISSN 0038-7134.
- Reuter, Timothy (1992). The Annals of Fulda. Manchester ; New York : New York, NY, USA: Manchester University Press. ISBN 0-7190-3458-2.
