= Oaths of Strasbourg =

842 military alliance made by the kings of East and West Francia

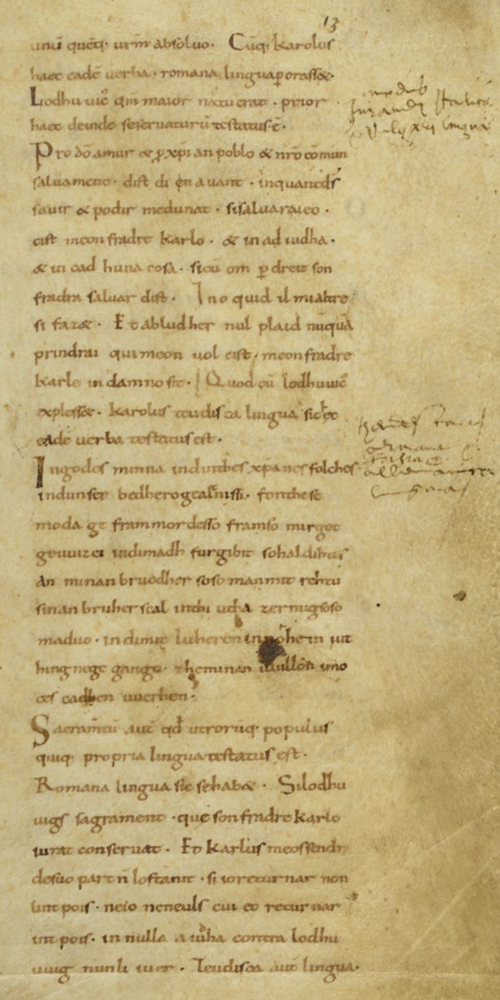

The Oaths of Strasbourg were a military pact made on 14 February 842 by Charles the Bald and Louis the German against their older brother Lothair I, the designated heir of Louis the Pious, the successor of Charlemagne. One year later the Treaty of Verdun was signed, with major consequences for Western Europe's geopolitical landscape.

Louis the German swore his oath in an early form of Old French so that the soldiers of Charles the Bald could understand him. Likewise, the latter recited his in Old High German so that Louis's soldiers would understand.

The section of the Oaths written in a language resembling French is of special importance to historical linguistics, as it is the oldest extant document in France that was written deliberately and consistently in a form of Romance language.

== Context ==
Centuries after the fall of the Western Roman Empire, Charlemagne, who had conquered much of its former territory, announced its restoration. Upon his death, he passed this realm to his son Louis the Pious, who in turn passed it to his firstborn son Lothair I. However, the latter's brothers—Charles and Louis—refused to recognize him as their suzerain. When Lothair attempted to invade their lands, they allied against him and defeated him at the Battle of Fontenoy in June 841. Charles and Louis met in February 842 near modern Strasbourg to affirm their alliance by swearing a joint oath against Lothair. The following year the civil war ended with the Treaty of Verdun, in which the three claimants partitioned the Empire amongst themselves.

The Oaths were not preserved in their original form, but were copied by the historian Nithard, another grandson of Charlemagne, in a work titled De Dissensionibus Filiorum Ludovici Pii "On the Quarrels of Louis the Pious's Sons". This was a firsthand account, as Nithard had campaigned alongside his cousin Charles the Bald. It was however biased, reflecting the perspective of the allies and casting Lothair as an aggressor and villain.

Louis and Charles swore their oaths not as kings—a term which is never used—but rather as lords, with their respective entourages acting as witnesses. Ostensibly they were acceding to Lothair I's demands as his future 'subjects'.

Although the Oaths are of little political importance, given that they were superseded by the more comprehensive Treaty of Verdun, they are of significant importance to the field of linguistics. As the scholar Philippe Walter wrote:

"This is the oldest extant French text. It is political in nature, not literary, and is important in that it marks the written debut of the 'vulgar' tongue."

== Manuscript ==
Nithard's text of the Oaths is in two manuscripts at the National Library of France.

The older manuscript was copied around the year 1000, probably for an abbey in Picardy (either that of Saint-Médard or Saint Riquier). In the fifteenth century it was in the possession of the Abbey of Saint Magloire in Paris. Around 1650 it was bought by the Swedish Queen Christina and transferred to Rome; after her death it was acquired by the Vatican Library. After Napoleon's forces captured Rome, it was transferred back to Paris along with various other historical manuscripts. Napoleon later returned most of the others, but kept this one. It is currently in the National Library of France under the call number Latin 9768; the Oaths are found on folio #13.

The other manuscript, which is in the same library under the call number Latin 14663, is a copy of the former that was made in the fifteenth century.

== Romance portion ==
Louis the German's oath is recorded as follows:

Pro Deo amur et pro christian poblo et nostro commun saluament, d'ist di en auant, in quant Deus sauir et podir me dunat, si saluarai eo cist meon fradre Karlo, et in adiudha et in cadhuna cosa, si cum om per dreit son fradra saluar dist, in o quid il mi altresi fazet. Et ab Ludher nul plaid nunquam prindrai qui meon uol cist meon fradre Karle in damno sit.

For the love of God and Christiandom and our joint salvation, from this day onward, to the best of my knowledge and abilities granted by God, I shall protect my brother Charles by any means possible, as one ought to protect one's brother, insofar as he does the same for me, and I shall never willingly enter into a pact with Lothair against the interests of my brother Charles.

The army of Charles the Bald swore that:

Si Lodhuvigs sagrament, que son fradre Karlo iurat conservat, et Karlus meos sendra de suo part non los tanit, si io returnar non l'int pois, ne io ne neuls, cui eo returnar int pois, in nulla aiudha contra Lodhuvig nun li iv er.

If Louis keeps the oath which he has sworn to his brother Charles, and my lord Charles on the other hand breaks it, if I cannot dissuade him from it, then neither I nor anyone else whom I could dissuade from it shall render him any aid against Louis.

== Germanic portion ==
The language reflects an early form of Ripuarian Frankish. Charles the Bald is recorded as saying:

In Godes minna ind in thes christianes folches ind unser bedhero gealtnissi, fon thesemo dage frammordes, so fram so mir Got geuuizci indi madh furgibit, so hald ih tesan minan bruodher, soso man mit rehtu sinan bruodher scal, in thiu, thaz er mig sosoma duo; indi mit Ludheren in nohheiniu thing ne gegango, zhe minan uuillon imo ce scadhen uuerhen.

This is a close translation of Louis's oath, except that an equivalent to et in aiudha et in cadhuna cosa appears to be missing. The soldiers of Louis the German replied:

Oba Karl then eid, then er sinemo bruodher Ludhuuuige gesuor, geleistit, indi Ludhuuuig min herro, then er imo gesuor, forbrihchit, ob ih inan es iruuenden ne mag, noh ih noh thero nohhein, then ih es iruuenden mag, uuidhar Karle imo ce follusti ne uuirdit.

This, in turn, was equivalent to the oath sworn by Charles's soldiers.

== Linguistic features ==
Several scholars consider the Romance portion of the Oaths to have been translated from an unattested Latin original, while others maintain that the existing Romance text is the untranslated original.

According to Hall, the text does not contain any particular features that would mark it as belonging to the future Oïl or Oc groups, with the possible exception of the form tanit 'keep' < *tɛ́ni̯at, which is characteristic of Lorraine. Hall describes the language of the text as "nearly undifferentiated conservative Pre-French".

The difficulty of discerning a particular dialect in the text may be due to a deliberate effort by the author to write in a sort of regional koiné. Cerquiglini further observes that "No Old French text, not even any of the oldest ones, shows dialectal features consistent with only one particular region."

Nevertheless, various other scholars have suggested that the Oaths were written in an early form of Picard, Lyonnais, Lorraine, or Poitevin.

== Transcriptions ==
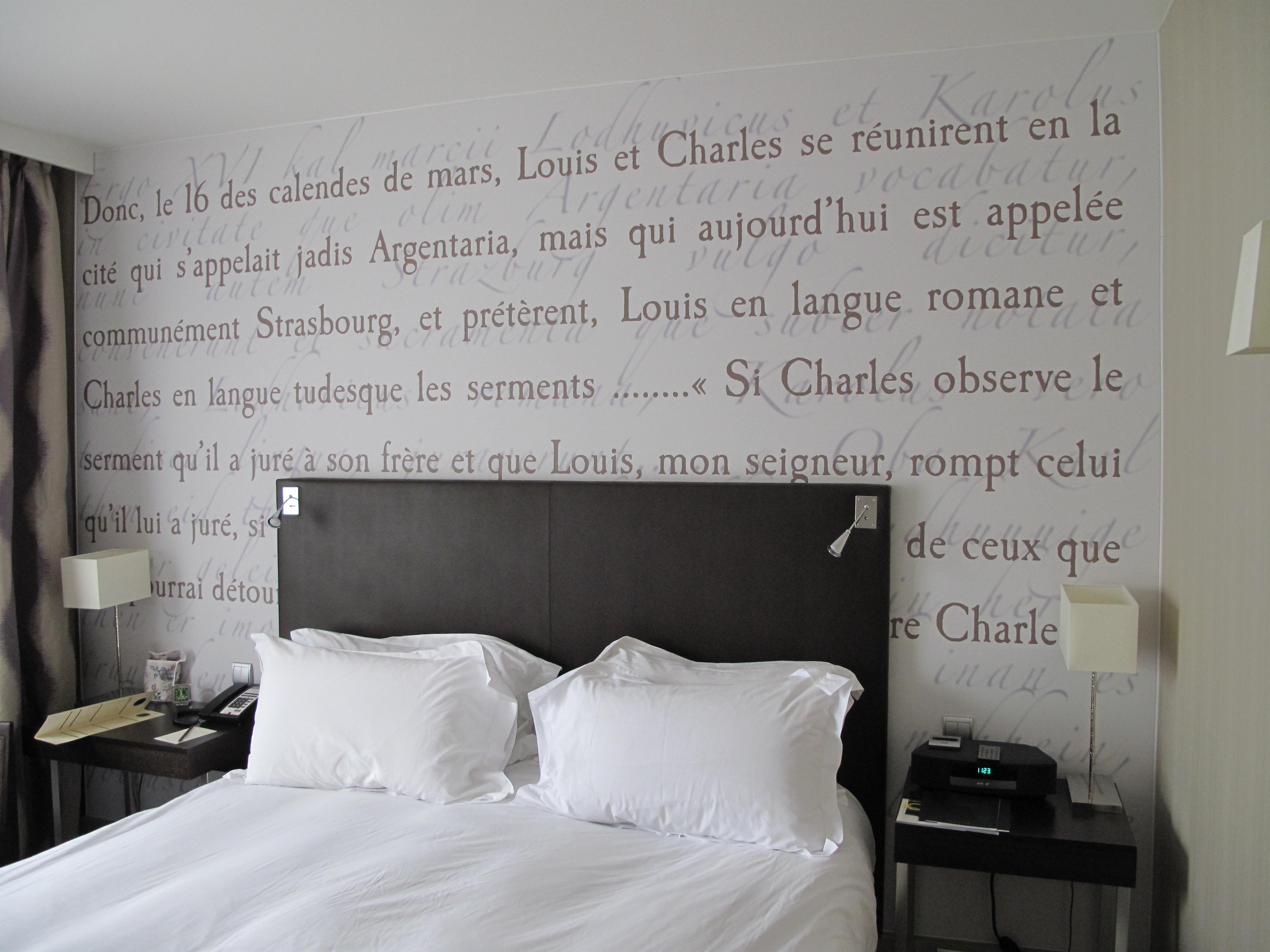
Hotel room in Strasbourg with oath text in Modern French

The following is a reconstructed pronunciation of Louis's oath and that of Charles's soldiers:

pro dɛ́ə amór e pro krístjan pɔ́blə e nɔ́strə komún salvamɛ́nt
dést dí en avánt
en kánt dɛ́əs savér e poðér mə dónat
sí salvarái̯ ɛ́ə
tsést məon fráðrə karlə
eð en ajúða
eð en kaðúna kɔ́za
sí kóm ɔ́m pər dréi̯t son fráðrə salvár déft
en ɔ́ keð íl mí altresí fátsət
eð a loðér núl plai̯t nónka prendrái̯
kí məon vɔ́l tsést məon fráðrə kárlə en dámnə sét

sí loðuvíks saɣramɛ́nt
kə son fráðrə kárlə dʒurát konsɛ́rvat
e kárləs mɛ́əs sɛ́ndrə də sóə párt non lə s tánət
sí jɔ́ rətornár non lént pɔ́i̯s
nə jɔ́ nə nəúls kui ɛ́ə rətornár ént pɔ́i̯s
en núla ajúða kɔ́ntra loðuvíg nón li iv ɛ́r

Here are the Romance sections of folio 13r along with digital facsimiles:

== Partitions of Charlemagne's empire ==
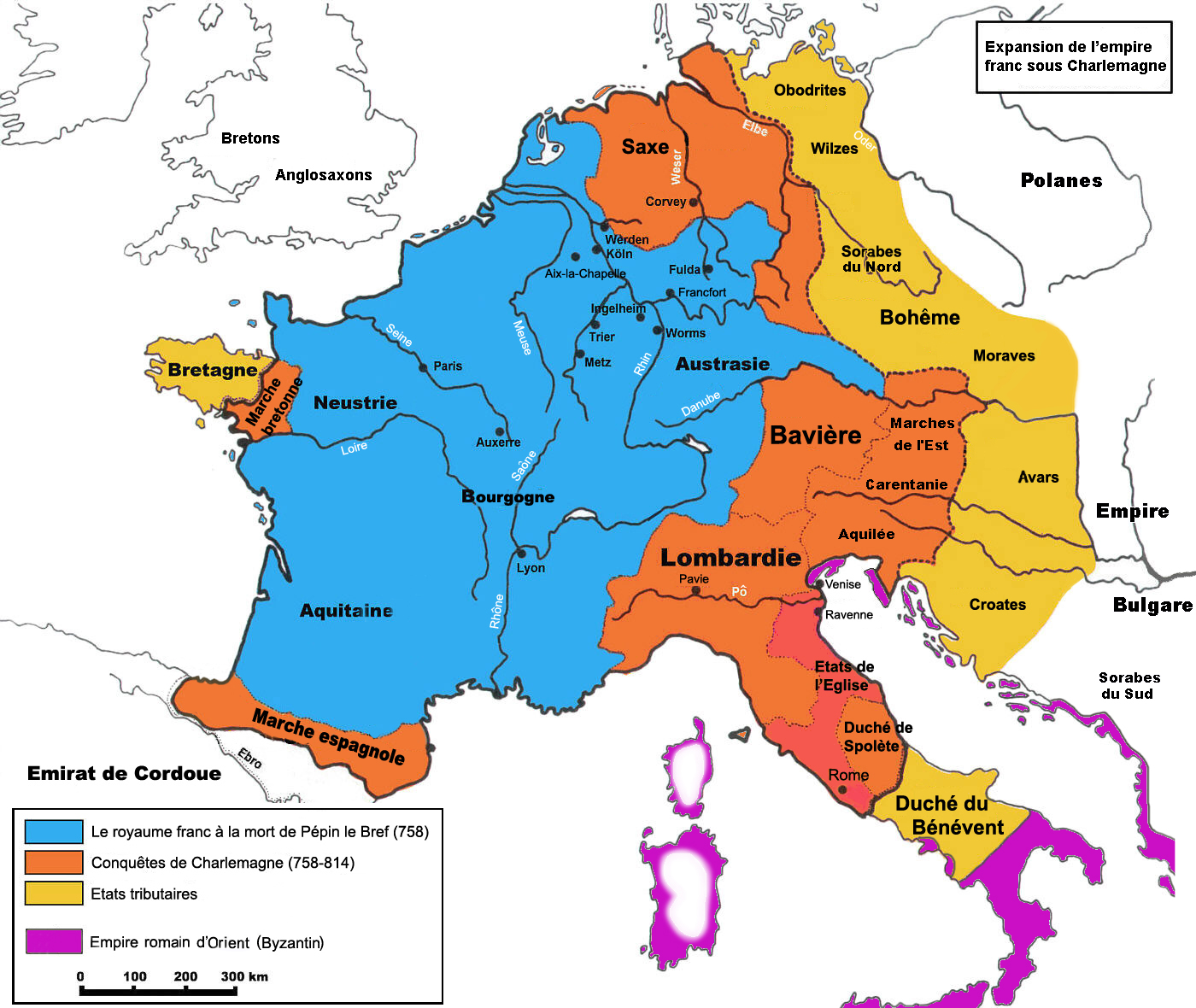
Conquests during the reign of Charlemagne, 758–814.

Partition of the Empire according to the Treaty of Verdun, 843.

Treaty of Prüm, 855.

Treaty of Mersen, 870.

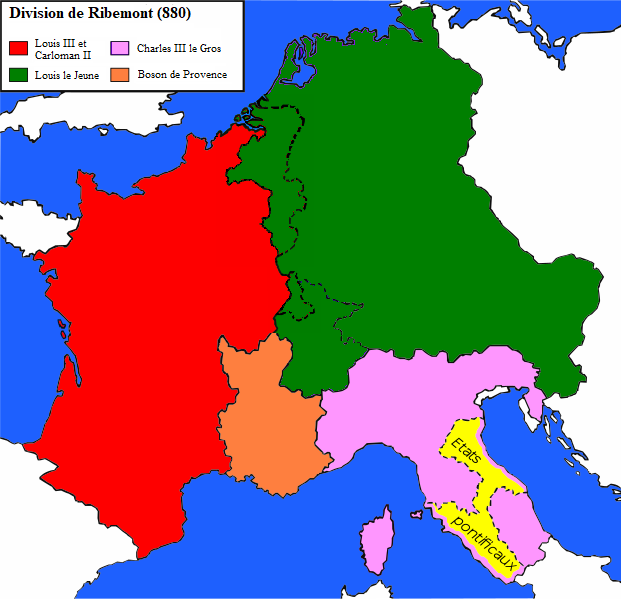
Treaty of Ribemont, 880.

== See also ==
- Kassel conversations
- Reichenau Glossary
