= Fontenoy, Yonne =

Fontenoy
- Commune
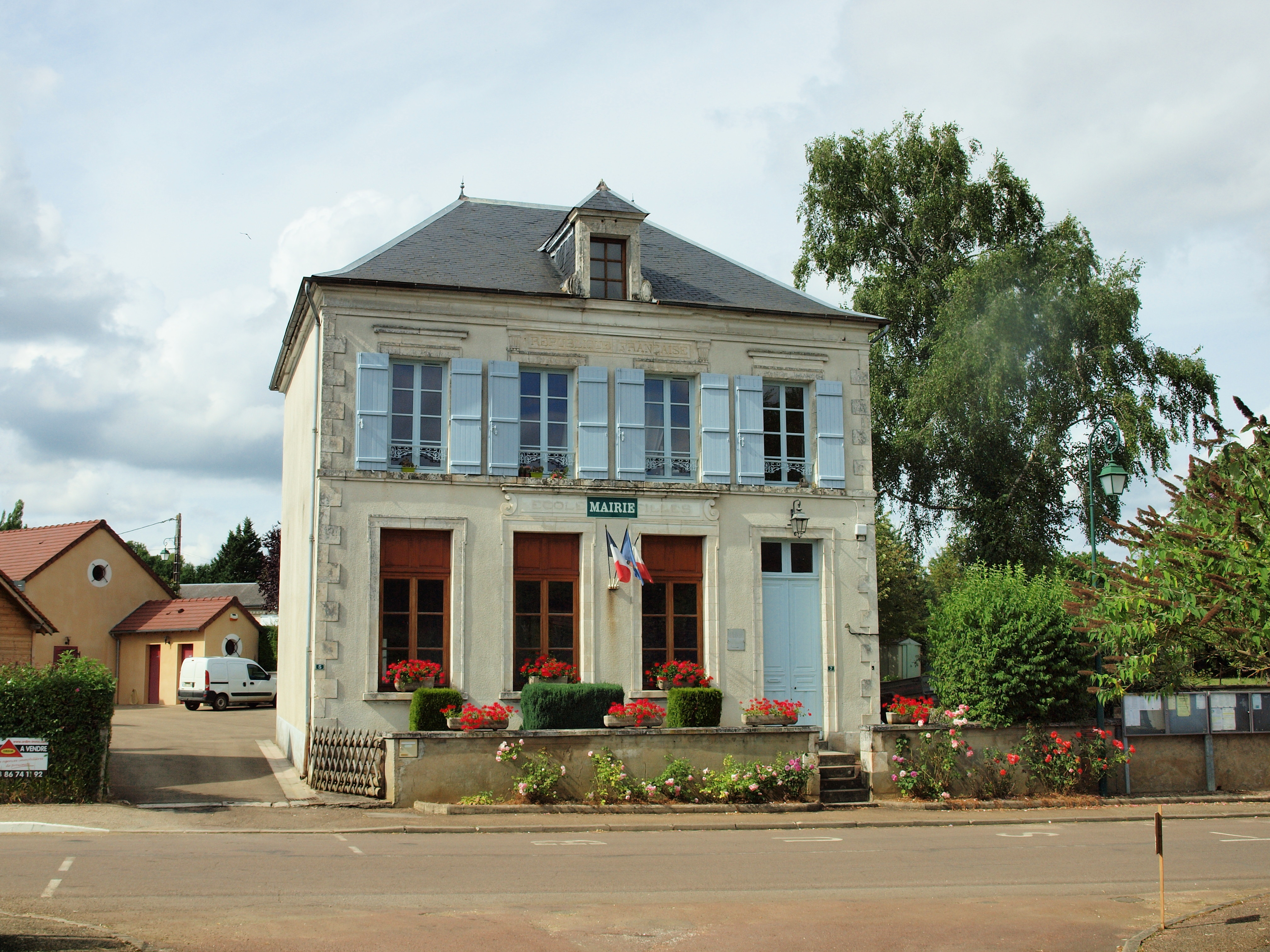
- The town hall in Fontenoy

- Coat of arms
- Location of Fontenoy
- Location within France Location within Bourgogne-Franche-Comté
- Coordinates: 47°38′59″N 3°18′28″E
- Country: France
- Region: Bourgogne-Franche-Comté
- Department: Yonne
- Arrondissement: Auxerre
- Canton: Vincelles

Government
  - Mayor (2020–2026): Benoît Perrier
- Area^{1}: 15.90 km^{2} (6.14 sq mi)
- Highest elevation: 307 m (1,007 ft)
- Lowest elevation: 213 m (699 ft)
- Population (2023): 305
  - Density: 19.2/km^{2} (49.7/sq mi)
- Time zone: UTC+01:00 (CET)
  - Summer (DST): UTC+02:00 (CEST)
- INSEE/Postal code: 89179 /89520
- ^{1} French Land Register data, which excludes lakes, ponds, glaciers > 1 km^{2} (0.386 sq mi or 247 acres) and river estuaries.

Fontenoy (French pronunciation: [fɔ̃tnwa]) is a commune in the Yonne department in Bourgogne-Franche-Comté in north-central France. It lies on the boundary between the natural regions of Puisaye and Forterre. It gave its name to the Battle of Fontenoy (841).

== See also ==
- Communes of the Yonne department
