= Lambert III of Nantes =

Lambert III
- Pretender to the County of Nantes
- Born: c. 830
- Died: 882
- Spouse: Rotrude of Italy
- Issue: Wipert of Nantes
- Father: Lambert II of Nantes
- Mother: Tetrata of Lombardy

Lambert III (c. 830–882) was pretender to the County of Nantes. Lambert was the son of Lambert II of Nantes, at whose death in 851, the administration of the region fell effectively to the Dukes of Brittany. After his father's death, Lambert III became a pretender to the County of Nantes. His mother was Tetrata of Lombardy, a daughter of Pepin of Italy, eldest son of Charlemagne. Lambert III married Rotrude of Italy, a daughter of Holy Roman Emperor Lothair I. The Emperor was a first cousin of Lambert's mother, as both were grandchildren of Charlemagne. Lambert's and Rotrude's only son was Wipert of Nantes.
