= Battle of Fontenoy (841) =

Battle of the Carolingian Civil War

Coordinates: 47°39′N 3°18′E

- Part of the Carolingian civil war
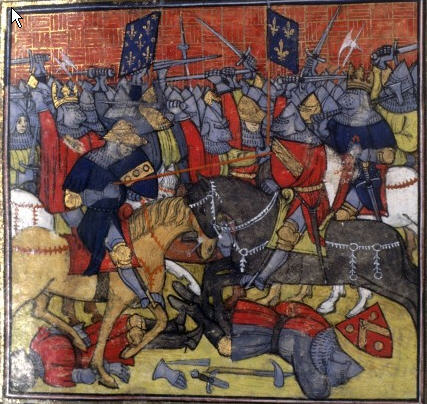
- The battle as depicted in a 15th-century copy of the Grandes Chroniques de France
Date	25 June 841
Location	Fontenoy, Yonne, Carolingian Empire
Result	Victory of Charles and Louis

Commanders and leaders
Lothair I Pepin II	Charles the Bald; Louis the German

Casualties and losses
Unknown	Unknown

The Battle of Fontenoy (25 June 841), also called the Battle of Fontenoy-en-Puisaye or Battle of Fontenay in older works, was the largest battle of the Carolingian civil war. Fought at Fontenoy in the Puisaye, the battle was a major defeat for the allied forces of Lothair I of Italy and Pepin II of Aquitaine, and a victory for Charles the Bald and Louis the German. It was not, however, decisive. Hostilities dragged on for another two years until the Treaty of Verdun.

== Background ==
The spring campaigning season of 841 began with both Charles and Lothair moving eastwards. In March, Charles crossed the Seine into the eastern part of the kingdom he claimed while Lothair's commanders steadily retreated, refusing to give battle. By late April, he was at Troyes. He was expecting his mother, the Empress Judith, to bring him reinforcements from his supporters in Aquitaine. At Troyes, Abbot Lupus of Ferrières urged him to seek "a bloodless victory".

Lothair crossed the Rhine in April, forcing Louis to retreat into Bavaria. He placed Adalbert of Metz in charge of the eastern lands and returned across the Rhine. After receiving messages from Charles, Louis broke out of Bavaria, crushing Adalbert's army in the Battle of the Ries on 13 May. In three weeks, Louis marched to Auxerre, but his army, dominated by battle-hardened Bavarians, was short of horses.

In June, Judith and the Aquitanians joined Charles's main army at Châlons and together they marched to Auxerre to join up with Louis.

According to Andreas Agnellus and the Annals of Saint-Bertin, a peace mission from Pope Gregory IV had recently arrived in Francia under Archbishop George of Ravenna. It was in Lothair's camp on the eve of battle, although Agnellus and the annalist differ as to the reason, with the former claiming that George was a Lotharian partisan and the annalist that Lothair refused to permit the mission to meet with his brothers.

== Battle ==
=== Opening manoeuvres ===
On 21 June, the allied army was in sight of Lothair's. Charles and Louis ordered fasting and prayers. On 22 June, Lothair withdrew to Fontenoy while Charles and Louis moved to Thury. They offered Lothair a division of the empire that would have given him Franconia west of the Rhine and the land between the Charbonnière Forest and the Meuse. To demonstrate their desire to avoid bloodshed, they offered Lothair all the wealth they had with them save their arms and horses.

Nithard and the Annals of Saint-Bertin both claim that Lothair was waiting at Fontenoy for Pepin II to arrive from Aquitaine. The feeling in his camp was confident. According to Agnellus, Archbishop George told the king that "Charles should be tonsured tomorrow", an indication that for at least some of Lothair's followers the goal was to deprive Charles of a kingdom entirely and not merely shrink his division of the empire. On 23 June, Louis and Charles announced that they would celebrate the nativity of John the Baptist the following day and join battle on 25 June at eight in the morning. Pepin arrived at Fontenoy on 24 June and Lothair restated his claim to the undivided empire, rejecting Charles and Louis's ultimatum.

=== Combat ===
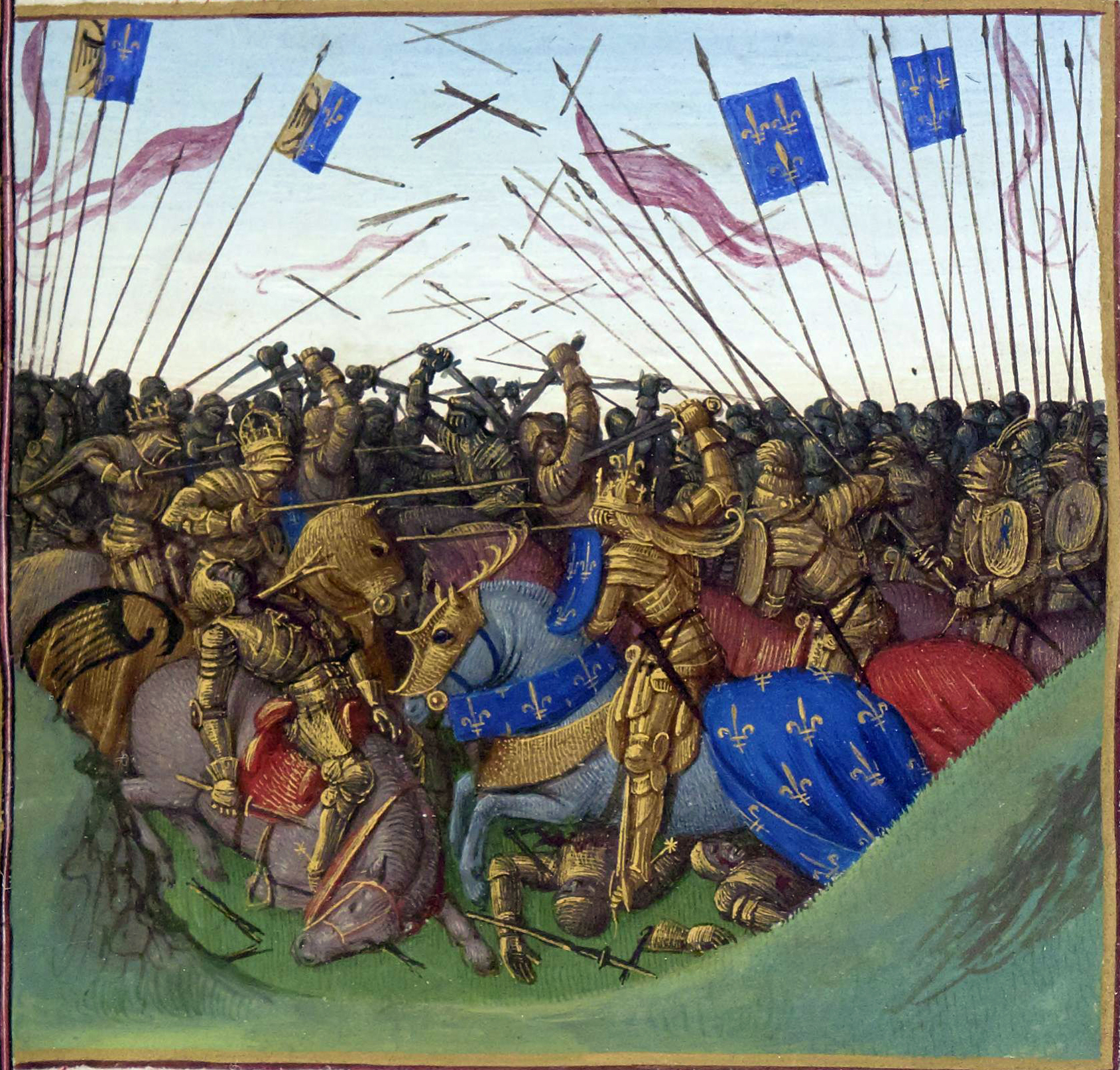
The battle of Fontenoy as depicted by Jean Fouquet in a 15th-century copy of the Grandes Chroniques

The two armies met on 25 June. According to tradition, Charles established his camp at Thury, on the hill of Roichat. Lothair and Pepin initiated battle and took the upper hand until the arrival of Guerin and his army of Provençals. While Pepin and his contingent continued to push back Charles' men, Lothair was slowly pushed back by Louis the German and the Provençals. Finally, when victory seemed sure for Charles, Bernard of Septimania entered the conflict on Charles's side and the victory became a rout. According to Agnellus of Ravenna a total of 40,000 men died, including Gerard of Auvergne and Ricwin of Nantes, who fell at Charles' side. Archbishop George, who was with Lothair, was captured.

"Neither dew nor showers nor rain ever fell again on that field where the most battle-hardened warriors had perished mourned by their mothers, their sisters, their brothers, and their friends. On Charles' side and Louis' too, the fields were white with the linen habits of the dead as they might have been with birds in the autumn."

In spite of his personal gallantry, Lothair was defeated and fled to his capital of Aachen. With fresh troops he entered upon a war of plunder, but the forces of his brothers were too strong for him, and taking with him such treasure as he could collect, he abandoned to them his capital.

The battle was not decisive.

== Angelbert's account ==
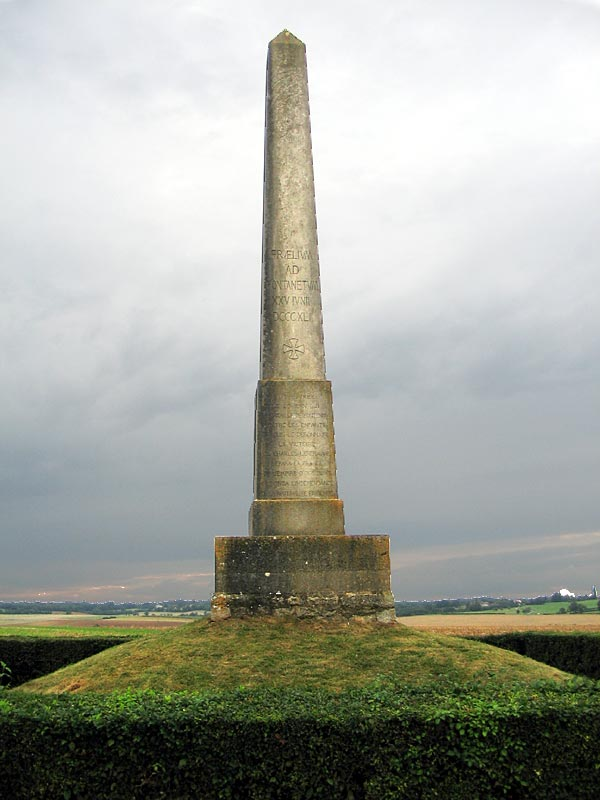
Obelisk commemorating the Battle of Fontenoy. On the pedestal is written: The victory of Charles the Bald separated France from the Western Empire, and founded the independence of French nationality.

Verses by Angelbert, who fought the battle on the side of Lothair are cited by historian Eleanor Shipley Duckett as the "Most striking of all these Latin records of the battle". The verses in English are...

Fontenoy they call its fountain, manor to the peasant known,
There the slaughter, there the ruin, of the blood of Frankish race;
Plains and forest shiver, shudder; horror wakes the silent marsh.

Neither dew nor shower nor rainfall yields its freshness to that field,
Where they fell, the strong men fighting, shrewdest in the battle's skill,
Father, mother, sister, brother, friends, the dead with tears have wept.

And this deed of crime accomplished, which I here in verse have told,
Angibert myself I witnessed, fighting with the other men,
I alone of all remaining, in the battle's foremost line.

On the side alike of Louis, on the side of Charles alike,
Lies the field in white enshrouded, in the vestments of the dead,
As it lies when birds in autumn settle white off the shore.

Woe unto that day of mourning! Never in the round of years
Be it numbered in men's annals! Be it banished from all mind,
Never gleam of sun shine on it, never dawn its dusk awake.

Night it was, a night most bitter, harder than we could endure,
When they fell, the brave men fighting, shrewdest in the battle's skill,
Father, mother, sister, brother, friends, the dead with tears have wept.

Now the wailing, the lamenting, now no longer will I tell;
Each, so far as in him lieth, let him stay his weeping now;
On their souls may He have mercy, let us pray the Lord of all.

== Bibliography ==
- Berto, Luigi Andrea, ed. (2021). Franks and Lombards in Italian Carolingian Texts: Memories of the Vanquished. Routledge.
- Brown, Peter (1975). "Society and the Supernatural: A Medieval Change". Daedalus. 104 (2): 133–151. JSTOR 20024334.
- Deliyannis, Deborah Mauskopf, ed. (2004). Agnellus of Ravenna: The Book of the Pontiffs of the Church of Ravenna. The Catholic University of America Press.
- Frassetto, Michael (2010). "Fontenay (Fontenoy), Battle of". In R. E. Bjork (ed.). The Oxford Dictionary of the Middle Ages. Oxford University Press.
- Gabriele, Matthew; Perry, David M. (2024). Oathbreakers: The War of Brothers That Shattered an Empire. HarperCollins.
- Gillmor, C. M. (2010). "Fontenoy, Battle of". In C. J. Rogers (ed.). The Oxford Encyclopedia of Medieval Warfare and Military Technology. Vol. 1. Oxford University Press. pp. 53–54.
- Godman, Peter (1985). Poetry of the Carolingian Renaissance. University of Oklahoma Press.
- Goldberg, Eric J. (2006). Struggle for Empire: Kingship and Conflict under Louis the German, 817–876. Cornell University Press.
- Halsall, Guy (2003). Warfare and Society in the Barbarian West, 450–900. Routledge.
- Nelson, Janet L., ed. (1991). The Annals of St-Bertin. Manchester University Press.
- Nelson, Janet L. (1992). Charles the Bald. Longman.
- Reuter, Timothy, ed. (1992). The Annals of Fulda. Manchester University Press.
- Scholz, Bernhard Walter, ed. (1970). Carolingian Chronicles: Royal Frankish Annals and Nithard's Histories. University of Michigan Press.
- Screen, Elina (2004). "The Importance of the Emperor: Lothar I and the Frankish Civil War, 840–843". Early Medieval Europe. 12 (1): 25–51. doi:10.1111/j.0963-9462.2003.00120.x.
