= Lothair I =

Carolingian Emperor from 817 to 855

- Emperor of the Romans
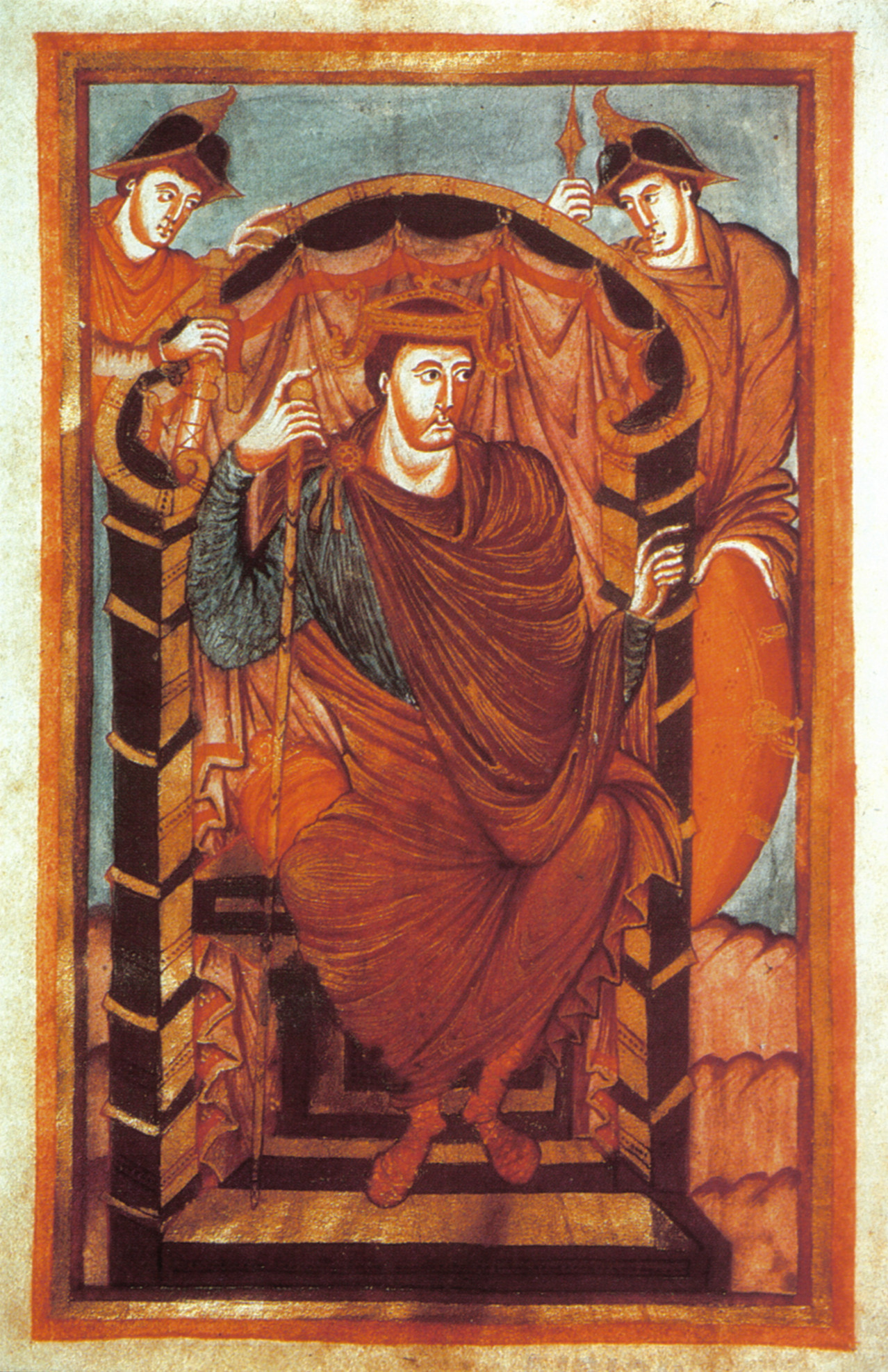
- Lothair I in the Gospels of Lothair, c. 849–851, now located in the Bibliothèque nationale de France

Emperor of the Carolingian Empire
- Reign: July 817 – 19 September 855
- Coronation: July 817, Aachen; 5 April 823, Rome
- Predecessor: Louis I the Pious
- Successor: Louis II of Italy

King of Italy
- Reign: 17 April 818 – 855
- Predecessor: Bernard of Italy
- Successor: Louis II of Italy

King of Middle Francia
- Reign: c. 10 August 843 – 855
- Predecessor: Louis I the Pious as King of the Franks
- Successor: Louis II (Italy); Lothair II (Lotharingia); Charles (Provence)
- Born: 795
- Died: 29 September 855 (aged 59–60); Prüm
- Burial: Prüm
- Consort: Ermengarde of Tours
- Issue more...: Louis II; Lothair II; Charles
- House: Carolingian
- Father: Louis I the Pious
- Mother: Ermengarde of Hesbaye

Lothair I (Frankish: Ludher and Medieval Latin: Lodharius; Dutch and Medieval Latin: Lotharius; German: Lothar; French: Lothaire; Italian: Lotario; 795 – 29 September 855) was a 9th-century Emperor of the Carolingian Empire (817–855, with his father until 840) and King of Italy (818–855) and Middle Francia (843–855).

Lothair I was the eldest son of the Carolingian emperor Louis I and his wife Ermengarde of Hesbaye, daughter of Ingerman the duke of Hesbaye. On several occasions, Lothair led his full-brothers Pepin I of Aquitaine and Louis the German in revolt against their father to protest against attempts to make their half-brother Charles the Bald a co-heir to the Frankish domains. Upon the father's death, Charles and Louis joined forces against Lothair in a three-year dynastic war (840–843). The struggles between the brothers led directly to the breakup of the Frankish Empire assembled by their grandfather Charlemagne, and laid the foundation for the development of modern France and Germany.

== Early life and reign ==
Division of the Carolingian Empire under the Treaty of Verdun (843)

Lothair was born in 795, to Louis the Pious and Ermengarde of Hesbaye. His father was the son of the reigning Emperor, Charlemagne. At the time of Lothair's birth, his father Louis was already the King of Aquitaine. Little is known of Lothair's early life, which was probably passed at the courts of his father and grandfather. In 814, the elderly emperor died, and left his sole surviving legitimate son Louis the Pious as successor to his vast empire. Being already of age, Lothair was sent to govern Bavaria for his father, the new emperor.

In 817, Louis the Pious drew up his Ordinatio Imperii. By that act, Louis designated Lothair as his principal heir and ordered that Lothair would be the overlord of Louis' younger sons Pippin of Aquitaine (who was 20) and Louis the German (who was 13), and also the presumptive overlord of the Kingdom of Italy, that was ruled at this time by their cousin, king Bernard of Italy. Lothair would also inherit their lands if they were to die childless. Lothair was then crowned joint emperor by his father at Aachen. At the same time, Aquitaine and Bavaria were granted to his brothers Pippin and Louis, respectively, as subsidiary kingdoms.

Following the death of Bernard (818), brought on by his plotting against and blinding by Louis the Pious, Italy was awarded to Lothair. In 821, Lothair married Ermengarde (d. 851), daughter of Hugh the Count of Tours. In 822, he assumed the government of Italy, and at Easter, 5 April 823, he received the royal crown of Italy, and was again crowned as emperor by Pope Paschal I, this time at Rome. In November 824, Lothair promulgated a statute, the Constitutio Romana, concerning the relations of pope and emperor, which reserved the supreme power to the secular potentate, and he afterwards issued various ordinances for the good government of Italy.

On Lothair's return to his father's court, his stepmother Judith won his consent to her plan for securing a kingdom for her son Charles, a scheme which was carried out in 829, when the young prince was given Alemannia as king. Lothair, however, soon changed his attitude and spent the succeeding decade in constant strife over the division of the Empire with his father. He was alternately master of the Empire, and banished and confined to Italy, at one time taking up arms in alliance with his brothers and at another fighting against them, while the bounds of his appointed kingdom were in turn extended and reduced.

== Division of the kingdom ==
Division of the Carolingian Empire under the Treaty of Prüm (855)

The first rebellion began in 830. All three brothers fought their father, whom they deposed. In 831, their father was reinstated and he deprived Lothair of his imperial title and gave Italy to Charles. The second rebellion was instigated by Angilbert II, Archbishop of Milan in 833, and again Louis was deposed in 834. Lothair, through the loyalty of the Lombards and later reconciliations, retained Italy and the imperial position through all remaining divisions of the Empire by his father.

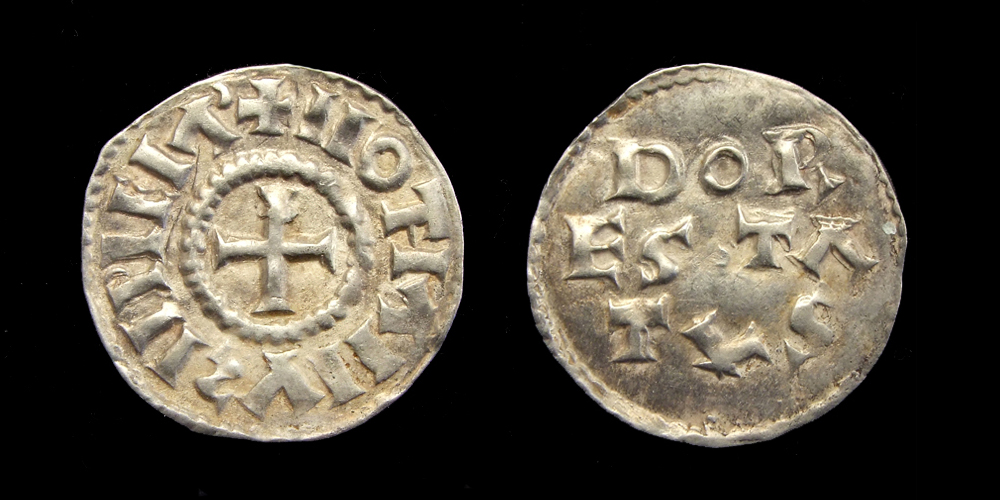
Denier of Lothair I, struck in Dorestad (Middle Francia) after 850

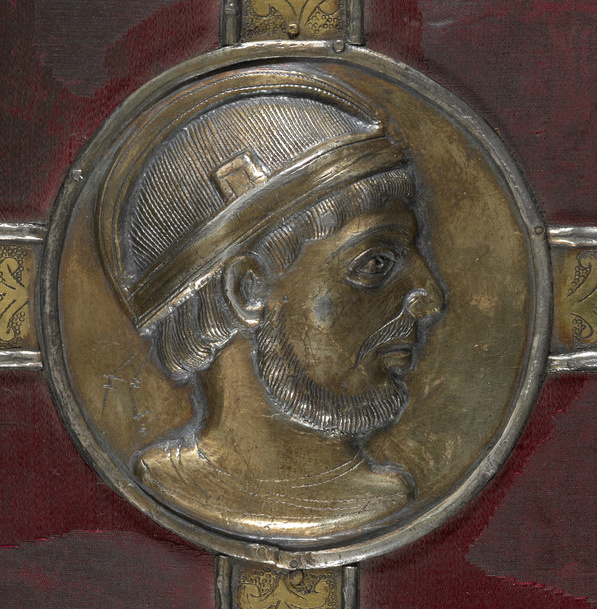
Medallion presumed to be of Lothair, from the binding of the Lothair Psalter in the British Library

When Louis the Pious was dying in 840, he sent the imperial insignia to Lothair, who, disregarding the various partitions, claimed the whole of the Empire. He was 45 years old when his father died. Negotiations with his brother Louis the German and his half-brother Charles, both of whom resisted this claim, were followed by an alliance of the younger brothers against Lothair. A decisive battle was fought at Fontenay-en-Puisaye on 25 June 841, when, in spite of his and his allied nephew Pepin II of Aquitaine's personal gallantry, Lothair was defeated and fled to Aachen. With fresh troops he began a war of plunder, but the forces of his brothers were too strong, and taking with him such treasure as he could collect, he abandoned his capital to them. He met with the leaders of the Stellinga in Speyer and promised them his support in return for theirs, but Louis and then the native Saxon nobility put down the Stellinga in the next years.

Peace negotiations began, and in June 842 the brothers met on an island in the Saône. They agreed to an arrangement which developed, after much difficulty and delay, into the Treaty of Verdun, signed in August 843. By this, Lothair received the imperial title as well as northern Italy and a long stretch of territory from the North Sea to the Mediterranean, essentially along the valleys of the Rhine and the Rhône; this territory includes the regions Lorraine, Alsace, Burgundy, and Provence. He soon ceded Italy to his eldest son, Louis, and remained in his new kingdom, engaging in alternate quarrels and reconciliations with his brothers and in futile efforts to defend his lands from the attacks of the Northmen (as Vikings were known in Frankish writings) and the Saracens (as those loyal to the various Fatimids, Umayyads and Abbasides are known in Frankish writings).

In 845 the count of Arles, Fulcrad, led a rebellion in Provence. The emperor put it down and the count joined him in an expedition against the Saracens in Italy in 846.

== Death and aftermath ==
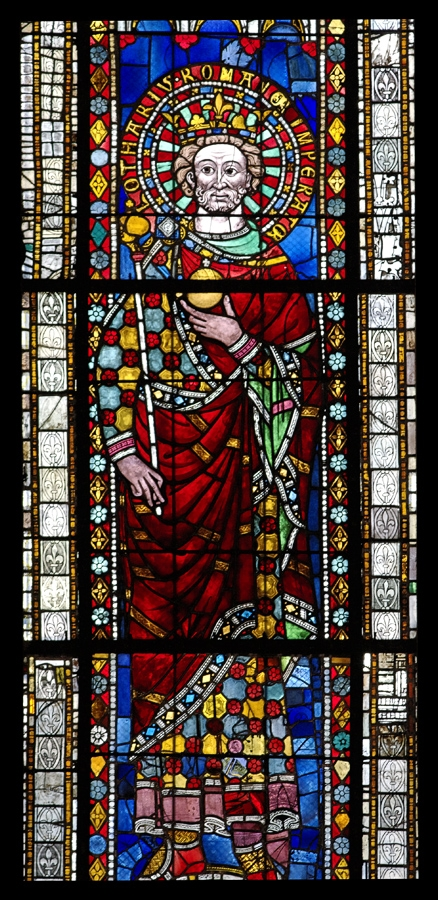
13th-century stained glass depiction of Lothair, Strasbourg Cathedral

In 855 he became seriously ill, and despairing of recovery renounced the throne, divided his lands among his three sons, and on 23 September entered the monastery of Prüm, where he died six days later. He was buried at Prüm, where his remains were found in 1860. It was at Prüm that Lothair was most commemorated.

The same year, Lothair's kingdom was divided between his three sons in a deal called the Treaty of Prüm: the eldest, Louis II, received Italy and the title of emperor; the second, Lothair II, received Lotharingia; the youngest, Charles, received Provence.

== Family ==
Lothair married Ermengarde of Tours in 821, who died in 851.

- Louis II (825–875) Crowned as King of Italy in 844 by Pope Sergius II. Crowned Emperor in 850. Married Engelberga
- Hiltrude (826–865) Married Berengar of Spoleto.
- Bertha (c. 830–852) Married to an unknown man, but later Abbess of Avenay.
- Gisela (c. 830–856) abbess of San Salvatore at Brescia.
- Lothair II (835–869) Succeeded his father. Married Teutberga, daughter of Boso the Elder, Count of Arles.
- Rotrude (c. 837) Married Lambert III of Nantes.
- Charles (845–863) Invested with Provence, Lyon and Transjuranian Burgundy

One illegitimate child is known.

- Carloman (? – d. 853)

== See also ==
- Middle Francia
- History of Italy
- History of Burgundy
- History of Provence

== Sources ==
- Bouchard, Constance B. (2001). Those of My Blood: Creating Noble Families in Medieval Francia. Philadelphia: University of Pennsylvania Press. ISBN 978-0-8122-0140-6.
- Bowlus, Charles R. (1995). Franks, Moravians, and Magyars: The Struggle for the Middle Danube, 788-907. Philadelphia: University of Pennsylvania Press. ISBN 978-0-8122-3276-9.
- Goldberg, Eric J. (2006). Struggle for Empire: Kingship and Conflict under Louis the German, 817-876. Ithaca, NY: Cornell University Press. ISBN 978-0-8014-3890-5.
- McKitterick, Rosamond (1983). The Frankish Kingdoms Under the Carolingians, 751-987. Harlow: Longman. ISBN 978-0-582-49005-5.
- Nelson, Janet L. (2019). King and Emperor: A New Life of Charlemagne. Oakland: University of California Press. ISBN 978-0-520-31420-7.
- Reuter, Timothy (1992). The Annals of Fulda. Manchester: Manchester University Press.
- Reuter, Timothy (2013) [1991]. Germany in the Early Middle Ages c. 800–1056. London and New York: Routledge.
- Riché, Pierre (1993). The Carolingians: A Family Who Forged Europe. Philadelphia: University of Pennsylvania Press.
- Scholz, Bernhard W., ed. (1970). Carolingian Chronicles: Royal Frankish Annals and Nithard's Histories. Ann Arbor, MI: University of Michigan Press. ISBN 0472061860.
- Schutz, Herbert (2004). The Carolingians in Central Europe, Their History, Arts, and Architecture: A Cultural History of Central Europe, 750-900. Leiden-Boston: Brill.
- West, Charles (2023). The Fall of a Carolingian Kingdom: Lotharingia, 855–869. Toronto: University of Toronto Press.

Lothair I Carolingian dynasty Died: 29 September 855
Regnal titles
Preceded by Louis the German	Duke of Maine; 817–831	Succeeded by Pepin I of Aquitaine
Preceded by Bernard	King of Italy; 818 – 23 September 855 with Louis II (844–855)	Succeeded by Louis II
Preceded by Louis the Pious as king of the Franks and emperor	Holy Roman Emperor; 817 – 23 September 855 with Louis the Pious (817–840); Louis II (850–855)	Succeeded by Louis II
Preceded by Louis the Pious as king of the Franks and emperor	King of Middle Francia; 843 – 23 September 855	Succeeded by Lothair II as king of Lotharingia
Preceded by Louis the Pious as king of the Franks and emperor	King of Middle Francia; 843 – 23 September 855	Succeeded by Charles as king of Provence
