= Irmgard of Chiemsee =

Beatified German nun (c.831-866)

Blessed Irmengard of Chiemsee
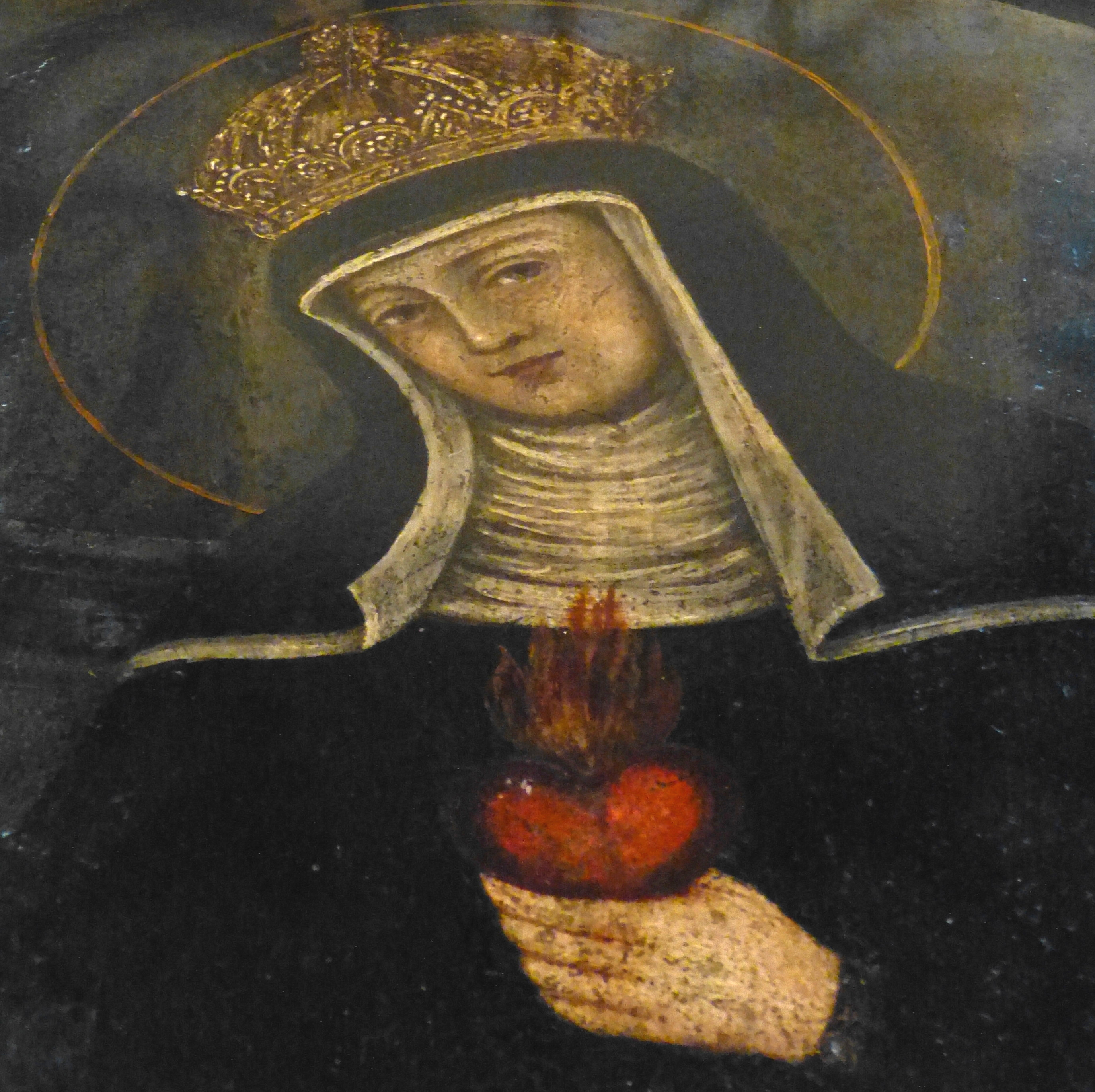
- Frecsco at the burial place of Bl. Irmengard in Frauenwörth minster
- Born: c. 830/833; Regensburg, Bavaria
- Died: 16 July 866; Frauenchiemsee
- Venerated in: Roman Catholic Church
- Beatified: 17 July 1929 by Pope Pius XI
- Feast: 16 July
- Attributes: crowned, in Benedictine habit with the crozier of an abbess, holding a flaming heart

Irmgard of Chiemsee (German: Selige Irmgard, also Irmengard; c. 831/833 – 16 July 866), a member of the Carolingian dynasty, was the second daughter of King Louis the German and his wife Hemma. She was the first abbess of Frauenwörth abbey from 857 until her death.

== Life ==
Born at King Louis' court in Regensburg, Bavaria, young Irmgard, like her sisters, was destined for a monastic life. She was raised at the Benedictine abbey of Buchau in Swabia, whose estates she later received from the hands of her father. She was known for her comprehensive education

About 850 Louis appointed Irmgard abbess of Frauenwörth, which had been founded by the last Agilolfing duke Tassilo III of Bavaria in 782 and held the status of an Imperial abbey since 788. During her leadership the decayed premises were restored and the former chapter for noble ladies developed into a Benedictine convent.

Since she was of Imperial descent, the incumbent abbess of Frauenwörth had the right to wear a thin golden hoop, resembling a little crown.

== Veneration ==
Irmgard was already venerated in the early 11th century, when abbot Gerhard had her head reliquary translated to Seeon Abbey in 1004. However, she was beatified only on 17 July 1929 by Pope Pius XI, on initiative of Cardinal Faulhaber. Her relics were re-unified during a festive ceremony in 2003.

Irmengard's feast is 16 July. In Frauenchiemsee, Irmengardstag is celebrated the Sunday nearest to 16 July. In paintings Irmgard is portrayed in a Benedictine habit either crowned with Bible and abbot's staff or with heart in her hand.

== Ancestry ==
Ancestors of Irmgard of Chiemsee

16. Pepin the Short
8. Charlemagne
17. Bertrada of Laon
4. Louis the Pious
18. Gerold of Anglachgau
9. Hildegard
19. Emma of Alamannia
2. Louis the German
20. Rodbert
10. Ingerman of Hesbaye
5. Ermengarde of Hesbaye
11. Hedwig of Bavaria
1. Irmgard of Chiemsee
6. Welf
3. Emma of Altdorf
7. Hedwig, Duchess of Bavaria
