= Hemma =

Queen of the Franks from 843 to 876

Emma of Altdorf
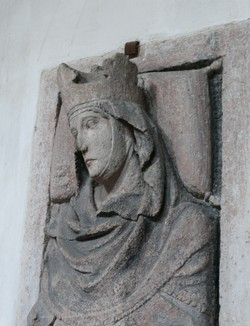
- Tomb effigy at St. Emmeram's Abbey

Queen consort of the Franks East Frankish queen
- Tenure: 843–876
- Born: c. 803
- Died: 31 January 876; Regensburg
- Spouse: Louis the German (m. 827)
- Issue more...: Louis the Younger; Irmgard of Chiemsee; Carloman of Bavaria; Charles the Fat
- House: Welf
- Father: Welf of Altdorf
- Mother: Hedwig of Saxony

Emma of Altdorf, also known as Hemma (c. 803 – 31 January 876), a member of the Elder House of Welf, was Queen consort of East Francia by marriage to King Louis the German, from 843 until her death.

== Life ==
Her father was Welf I (d. 825), Count of Altorf in Alamannia; her mother was Hedwig (Heilwig; c. 775 – after 833), a daughter of the Saxon count Isambart. Emma's elder sister was Judith, who in February 819 married the Carolingian emperor Louis the Pious, and thereby became Queen consort of the Franks and Holy Roman Empress. The marriage marked a crucial step forward in the rise of the Welf dynasty.

In 827, probably at the instigation of Judith, Hemma married Louis the German, the youngest son of Emperor Louis the Pious from his first marriage with Ermengarde of Hesbaye, and stepson of Hemma's sister Judith. The wedding ceremony possibly took place in Regensburg, where Louis the German resided as King of Bavaria subordinate to his father. In 833, Hemma received Obermünster Abbey in Regensburg from her husband.

Emperor Louis died in 840. After severe innerdynastic struggles, the Carolingian Empire eventually was divided according to the Treaty of Verdun in 843. The Kingdom of Bavaria was merged with Louis the German's Kingdom of East Francia (the predecessor of the Kingdom of Germany), and his wife Hemma became the first East Frankish queen.

Hemma is rarely mentioned in contemporary sources; she does not seem to have had much influence on her husband's rule. The Annales Bertiniani written by Archbishop Hincmar of Reims however reproach her for a pride which displeased the people of Italy. She is also said to have inordinately favoured her son Carloman, designated heir of his father in Bavaria, which led to a revolt by his brothers.

Hemma suffered a stroke in 874 and subsequently became paralyzed and speechless; King Louis visited her the last time in 875. She died on 31 January 876, a few months before her husband, and was buried in St. Emmeram's Abbey, Regensburg. Her tomb, erected around 1300, is considered a masterpiece of medieval sculpture.

== Family ==
By Louis, she had eight children:

- Hildegard (827–856)
- Carloman (828–880)
- Ermengard ( c. 830-866)
- Gisela, married to Berctolf, Count of Swabia. Grandmother of Cunigunde of Swabia, wife of Conrad I.
- Emma
- Louis the Younger (830–882)
- Bertha (died 877)
- Charles the Fat (839–888)

Her sons became Kings; three of her daughters became nuns.

| Preceded by vacant | Queen consort of Bavaria; 827–843 | Vacant Title next held by herself as Queen consort of East Francia |
| Preceded by herself as Queen consort of Bavaria | Queen consort of East Francia (Germany); 843–876 | Succeeded by Liutgard |
| Preceded by herself as Queen consort of Bavaria | Queen consort of East Francia (Germany); 843–876 | Succeeded by Richardis |
