= Isembard =

Isembard, also spelled Isembart, Isembert or Isambard, may refer to:

- Isembard (vassal of Charlemagne), a leader of the Reconquista campaign of 805
- Isembard, Count of Autun (floruit 850–59), Burgundian nobleman and count of Autun
- Isembart de Broyes, bishop of Orléans (1033–63)
- Isembert I, bishop of Poitiers (1021–47)
- Isembert II, bishop of Poitiers (1047–87)

== See also ==
- Gormond et Isembart, a medieval epic poem
- Isambard
- Isambart
