= Hedwig of Bavaria =

Saxon noblewoman

Hedwig
- Born: c. 778; Alamannia
- Died: c. 835; Bavaria
- Noble family: Elder House of Welf; Ecbertiner; Carolingian dynasty
- Spouse: Welf
- Issue Details...: Judith, Holy Roman Empress and Queen of the Franks; Conrad I, Count of Auxerre; Rudolph, Count of Ponthieu; Hemma, Queen of East Francia; Mathilda d'Andech von Altdorf
- Father: Isambart
- Mother: Thiedrada

Hedwig also Heilwig, (c. 778 – c. 835) was a Saxon noblewoman, abbess of Chelles, the wife of Count Welf, and mother-in-law of Emperor Louis the Pious through his marriage to Judith, her daughter.

== Life ==
Hedwig was possibly born at Altdorf in the Frankish lands of Alamannia (present-day Germany). According to Bishop Thegan of Trier, she was a member of the Ecbertiner family, a powerful Franco-Saxon Family. She was the daughter of Count Isambart and Thiedrada.

Upon her daughter's marriage to Louis the Pious, the family began benefiting from royal patronage, with the family possessing the previously royal estate of Schussengau in 819.

In 827, Hedwig's other daughter Hemma married Louis the German, making Hedwig mother-in-law to both Emperor Louis and his Son.

Hedwig was ordained the abbess of Chelles before 825, likely entering upon Welf's death. Under Hedwig, the abbey would become a significant abbey surrounding queenship, hosting the bones of Saint Balthild, a Merovingian queen consort. Hedwig would become an advocate for the cult of Balthild, being responsible for transferring the relics of Saint Balthild to Aachen on behest of Louis the Pious.

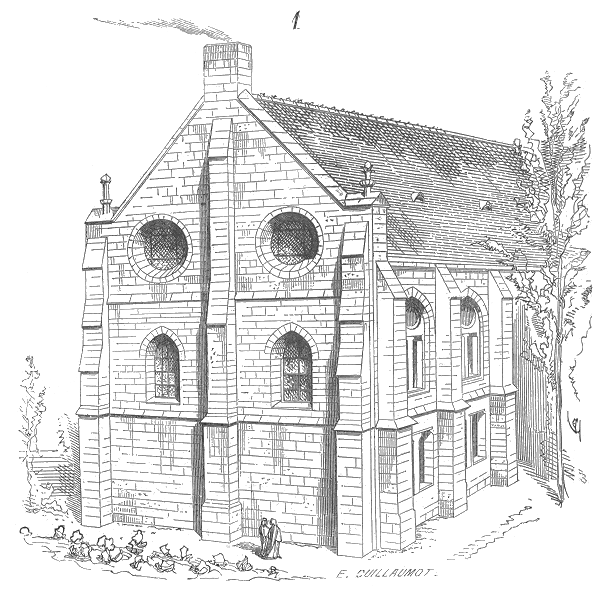
Eugène Viollet-le-Duc's reconstruction of the 13th-century dormitory at Chelles, Hedwig's Abbey.

Hedwig died in c. 835 and was buried in the Basilica of Saint Martin, in modern-day Baden-Wurttemberg.

== Family ==
Hedwig's parents were Isambart, Count of Thurgau, and his second wife Thiedrada.

Hedwig had a sister, Adalung des Franken; half-brother, Hunfrid I, Margrave of Istria; and a brother, Guelph, Count of Andechs.

== Marriage and issue ==
Hedwig was married to Count Welf I and together they had the following children:

- Judith of Bavaria (c. 797–843); married Louis the Pious, who was King of the Franks and co-emperor of the Holy Roman Empire with his father, Charlemagne
- Conrad I, Count of Auxerre c. 800–864; ancestor of the Welf kings of Burgundy
- Rudolph, Count of Ponthieu (c. 802–866)
- Hemma (c. 803–876); married Louis the German, King of East Francia and son of Louis the Pious
- Mathilda d'Andech von Altdorf

Through her marriage to Welf, she is the matriarch of the dynastic Welf family and is an ancestor of the Carolingian dynasty, the kings of Italy, Russia, Britain and the Bavarian Welfs.

== Gallery ==
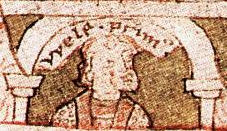
Husband Welf I

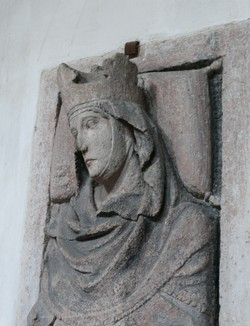
Tomb effigy of daughter Queen Hemma

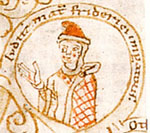
Daughter, Judith of Bavaria

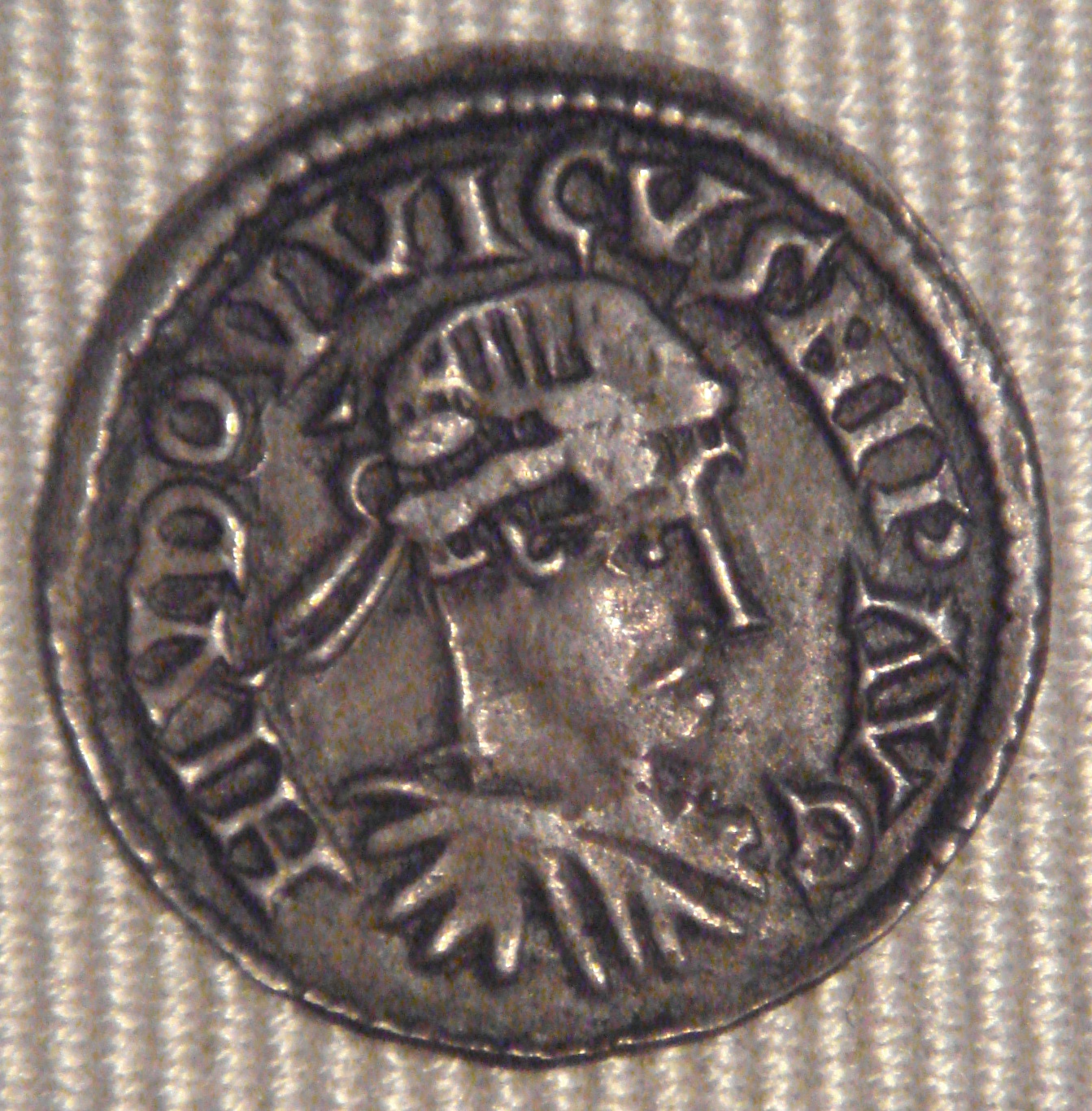
Son-in-law Louis on a denarius from Sens, c.818

== See also ==
- Hedwig Jagiellon, Duchess of Bavaria
