= Charles (archbishop of Mainz) =

Roman Catholic archbishop, Aquitain, 825/830 - 863

- Archbishop of Mainz
- Church: Catholic Church
- Diocese: Electorate of Mainz
- In office: 856–863
- Predecessor: Rabanus Maurus
- Successor: Liutbert

Personal details
- Died: 4 June 863

Charles (825/830 – 4 June 863) was the second son of Pepin I of Aquitaine and Engelberga.

He lived at the court of his uncle Lothair until 848, when, hearing of the deposition of his brother, he set out in March 849 with a band of followers to claim the Aquitainian realm. He was captured by Vivian, count of Maine at the Loire and sent to Charles the Bald. He was put in the monastery of Corbie as either a monk or a deacon.

He escaped in 854 to recruit an army to fight for his brother. He had little success and fled to the court of Louis the German, who made him the archbishop of Mainz and archchancellor on 8 March 856. He made a respectable bishop and died on 4 June 863 and was buried in St. Alban's Abbey, Mainz.

== Sources ==
- Dictionnaire de Biographie Française. Roman d'Amat and R. Limousin-Lamothe (ed). Paris, 1967.

Preceded by Rabanus Maurus	Archbishop of Mainz; 856–863	Succeeded by Liutbert

Ancestors of Charles (archbishop of Mainz)

16. Pepin the Short
8. Charlemagne
17. Bertrada of Laon
4. Louis the Pious
18. Gerold of Anglachgau
9. Hildegarde
19. Emma of Alamannia
2. Pepin I of Aquitaine
20. Rodbert
10. Ingerman of Hesbaye
5. Ermengarde of Hesbaye
11. Hedwig of Bavaria
1. Charles (Archbishop of Mainz)
6. Theodobert of Madrie
3. Ingeltrude of Madrie
