= Liutbert (archbishop of Mainz) =

Liutbert (or Ludbert) (died 889) was the Archbishop of Mainz from 863 until his death. He also became Abbot of Ellwangen in 874 and is reckoned the first Archchancellor of Germany. He was one of the major organisers—along with Henry of Franconia—of the vigorous and successful defence of East Francia against Viking attack during his last decade.

In May 868, Liutbert presided over the synod of Worms, which condemned the Greek church for heresy and laid down punishments for rebels. In 870, he became the archchaplain of Louis the German until 876 and thereafter of Louis the Younger until the latter's death in 882. Under Charles the Fat, however, he did not retain this position, rather it was preserved for Liutward of Vercelli. Liutbert did not accept his lack of position at court initially; he had himself referred to as "archchaplain," though he was not, in an 882 document of Weissenburg, another abbey of which he was abbot.

The Annales Fuldenses, from about the 860s, was being written in the circle of Liutbert and after 882 until 887 (the so-called "Mainz continuation") under his supervision. Because of the demotion he had suffered after the accession of Charles the Fat to all East Francia in 882, Liubert was a partisan opponent of the emperor's. It has even been suggested that the Mainz Annales' depiction of Liutbert and Liutward bears resemblance to the figures of Mordecai and Haman in the Book of Esther., based on the work of Geneviève Bührer-Thierry. Liutbert was also an opponent of Charles' plan to make his heir his bastard son Bernard.

In 871, the Moravians rebelled against Frankish overlordship and the Sorbs along the Elbe followed suit. An army under Liutbert's command defeated them at Waldaha (Vltava or Moldau). In 883, when Vikings sailed up the Rhine and took a great deal of plunder, Liutbert met them with a small force and retrieved their booty. He also rebuilt Cologne, which they had damaged. In late 884, the Vikings attacked West Francia and wintered in Hesbaye. Early in 885, in a campaign organised by Charles the Fat, Liutbert and Henry of Franconia surprised the Vikings and set them to flight.

Early in 887, Charles the Fat was forced to dismiss his chaplain and chancellor Liutward and replace him with Liutbert at the behest of the Alemannians. After regaining his high post, Liutbert's attitude toward the emperor significantly improved and he was able to draw more imperial largesse to Franconia.

== Notes ==
=== Sources ===
- Goldberg, Eric Joseph (2006). Struggle for Empire: Kingship and Conflict Under Louis the German, 817–876. Ithaca, NY: Cornell University Press.
- MacLean, Simon (2003). Kingship and Politics in the Late Ninth Century: Charles the Fat and the end of the Carolingian Empire. Cambridge University Press. ISBN 9780521044455.
- Reuter, Timothy (1991). Germany in the Early Middle Ages 800–1056. New York, NY: Longman. ISBN 9780582490345.
- Reuter, Timothy (1992). The Annals of Fulda. Manchester Medieval series, Ninth-Century Histories. Vol. II. Translated by Timothy Reuter. Manchester: Manchester University Press. ISBN 978-0-7190-3458-9.
- Thompson, James Westfall (1928). Feudal Germany. Vol. II. New York, NY: Frederick Ungar Publishing Co.

Preceded by Charles, Archbishop of Mainz	Archbishop of Mainz; 863–889	Succeeded by Sunderolt, Archbishop of Mainz
