= Synod of Worms =

Synod of Worms or Council of Worms may refer to:

- Synod of Worms (868)
- Synod of Worms (1076)
