= Rudolph, Count of Ponthieu =

9th-century Count of Ponthieu

Rudolph
- Died: 866
- Noble family: Elder House of Welf
- Spouse: Hruodun
- Issue among others...: Rudolf, Duke of Rhaetia
- Father: Welf
- Mother: Hedwig of Bavaria

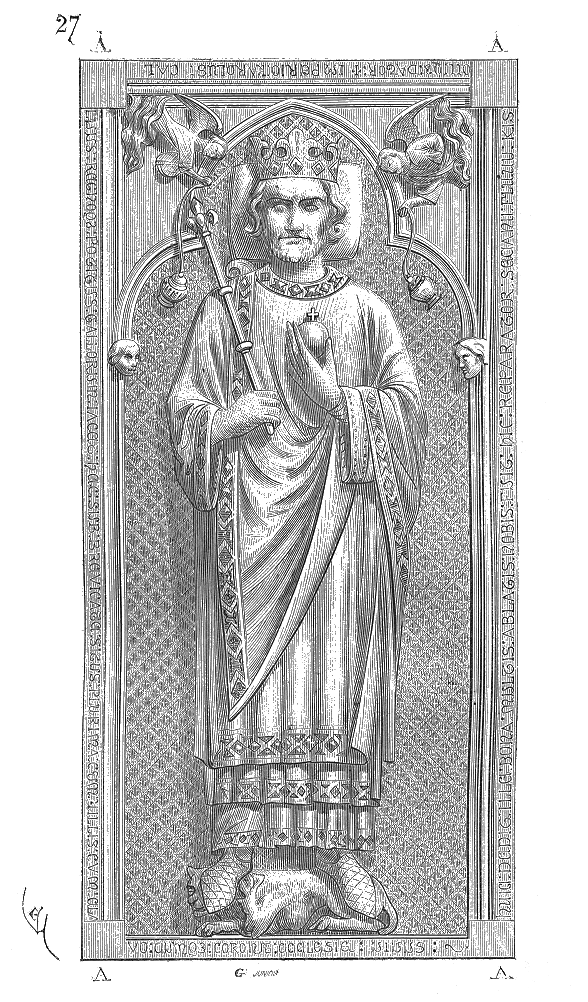
Charles the Bald, nephew of Rudolph. Charles liberated Rudolph from the monastery.

Count Rudolph (or Rudolf) of Ponthieu (died 866) was a son of Welf (also Hwelf or Welf I) by Hedwig of Bavaria, and thus a brother of Judith of Bavaria who was the second wife of Emperor Louis the Pious. Through Judith's influence, her brother Rudolph acquired and became lay abbot of the abbeys of Saint Riquier and Jumieges.

In April 830, Frankish nobility revolted against Emperor Louis in order to "liberate" him from the influence of his wife Judith. Louis was placed under house arrest, whilst Judith and her brothers Rudolph and Conrad I, Count of Auxerre, were imprisoned in Aquitanian monasteries. The two brothers were later freed when their nephew Charles the Bald assumed the throne.

== Marriage and children ==
Rudolph was married to Hruodun (died 867), who bore him:

- Conrad, Count of Paris and Sens (died 882)
- Welf, Abbot of Sainte-Colombe-de-Sens
- Hugh
- Rudolf, Duke of Rhaetia
