= Isambard =

Isambard is a given name. It is Norman, of Germanic origin, meaning either "iron-bright" or "iron-axe". The first element comes from isarn meaning iron (or steel). The second element comes from either biart-r (bright, glorious) or from barđa (a broad axe). It was used by:

- Marc Isambard Brunel (1769–1849), French-born engineer
- Isambard Kingdom Brunel (1806–1859), British engineer, son of Marc Isambard Brunel
- Isambard Owen (1850–1927), British physician and university academic, son of an employee of Isambard Kingdom Brunel
- Isambard Prince, a villain in seasons 3 and 4 of the television series Lexx
- Isambard Beerbohm Toad, a villain in the 1989 animated film A Tale of Two Toads

== See also ==
- Isembard (disambiguation)
- Isambard Brunel (disambiguation)
- Isambart (died after 806), Frankish count
