= Charles of Aquitaine =

Charles of Aquitaine may refer to:

- Charles (archbishop of Mainz) (d. 863), second son of Pepin II of Aquitaine
- Charles the Child (d. 866), king of Aquitaine, second son of Charles the Bald
