= Sunderolt =

- Archbishop of Mainz
- Church: Catholic Church
- Diocese: Electorate of Mainz
- In office: 889–891

Personal details
- Died: 25 June 891

Sunderolt (or Sunderhold) (died 25 June 891) was the Archbishop of Mainz from 889 until his death.

Sunderolt had not held the primatial see of Germany for long when a Viking invasion of West Francia attracted his attention. He led an army of Rhenish and Lotharingian troops against the Vikings. He was killed in the ensuing battle, for which the Annales Fuldenses castigated his rashness. He was succeeded by Hatto I of Reichenau.

== Sources ==
- The Annals of Fulda. (Manchester Medieval series, Ninth-Century Histories, Volume II.) Reuter, Timothy (trans.) Manchester: Manchester University Press, 1992.

Preceded by Liutbert	Archbishop of Mainz; 889-891	Succeeded by Hatto I
