= Isambard Brunel =

Isambard Brunel may refer to individuals from three generations of the engineering dynasty:

- Sir Marc Isambard Brunel (1769–1849), French-born engineer who settled in England
- Isambard Kingdom Brunel (1806–1859), English mechanical and civil engineer
- Isambard Brunel Junior (1837–1902), oldest son of Isambard Kingdom Brunel

== See also ==
- Isambard
