= Welf (father of Judith) =

Frankish noble

Welf I
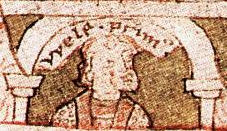
- Depiction in the Historia Welforum, about 1170
- Born: c. 776; Hall of Ramida
- Died: c. 825
- Noble family: Elder House of Welf
- Spouse: Hedwig of Bavaria
- Issue Details...: Judith, Queen of the Franks; Conrad I, Count of Auxerre; Rudolph, Count of Ponthieu; Hemma, Queen of East Francia

Welf I (or Hwelf; c. 776 – c. 825) is the first documented ancestor of the Elder House of Welf. He is mentioned as a count (comes) in the Frankish lands of Altdorf in Alamannia. He is the son of Rothard of the Argengau and grandson of Hardrad.

== Life ==
Welf originated from a distinguished dynasty of Franconian nobles. He is mentioned only once: on the occasion of the wedding of his daughter Judith to Emperor Louis the Pious in 819 at Aachen. His son Conrad later appeared as a dux (duke) in Alamannia and achieved a powerful position in the Upper Swabian estates he possibly had inherited from his mother Hedwig.

His family became politically powerful when Louis the Pious chose Welf's oldest daughter as his second wife upon the death of his consort Ermengarde of Hesbaye. Though Welf himself never became publicly prominent, his family became interwoven with the Carolingian dynasty.

== Marriage and issue ==
Welf married Hedwig (Heilwig), daughter of the Saxon count Isambart; Hedwig later became abbess of Chelles. The couple had the following children:

- Judith of Bavaria (c. 797–843); married Louis the Pious, who was King of the Franks and co-emperor with his father, Charlemagne.
- Conrad (c. 800–864), Count of Auxerre; ancestor of the Welf kings of Burgundy.
- Rudolph (c. 802–866), Count of Ponthieu.
- Hemma (c. 803–876); married King Louis the German, King of East Francia and son of Louis the Pious.

== Sources ==
- Riche, Pierre (1993). The Carolingians, A Family Who Forged Europe. Translated by Allen, Michael Idomir. University of Philadelphia Press.
