= Synod of Worms (868) =

The Synod of Worms of May 868 was a council of the church in East Francia, convoked by King Louis the German at the request of Pope Nicholas I. It condemned the Synod of Constantinople of 867 as heretical and condemned Great Moravia for rebelling against Louis.

The synod was attended by two archbishops, twenty bishops, a chorbishop and seven abbots. This was a high level of attendance for the ninth century in East Francia. It was under the presidency of Archbishop Liutbert of Mainz. Held in the aftermath of the Photian Schism, which had divided the Greek East and Latin West, it sought to uphold Western teaching and Papal primacy. It issued a Response against the Heresy of the Greeks (Latin Responsio contra Grecorum heresim) to refute the council of 867. In response to years of unrest in Moravia and the marches of Pannonia and Carantania, the synod authorized the confiscation of the rebels' private property and their excommunication. Rebellious clergy were to be deposed from their offices. It is probable that the synod had in mind the Byzantine missionaries Constantine and Methodius, who had been working in Moravia, but by 868 they had the support of Pope Hadrian II in Rome.

The synod issued 44 canons. Seven of them found their way into Gratian's Decretum, a higher number than for any other Frankish synod save the Synod of Tribur. The bishops at Worms were influenced by the councils of Toledo. On matters of episcopal authority, the canons cite the Collectio Hispana and not the False Decretals, either because the latter were unknown in East Francia or else were not considered authoritative there. Copies of the canons were regularly extended, however, so that some have as many as 80 canons (36 spurious). There are almost 100 surviving manuscript sources for the canons of Worms. Besides Gratian, they are also quoted in Regino of Prüm, Burchard of Worms, Bonizo of Sutri and Ivo of Chartres.

== Signatories ==
The signatories of the acts of the synod were:

- Liutbert of Mainz
- Adalwin of Salzburg
- Rimbert of Hamburg
- Altfrid of Hildesheim
- Gunzo of Worms
- Salomon I of Constance
- Anno of Freising
- Lantfrid of Säben
- Ermanrich of Passau
- Otgar of Eichstätt
- Witgar of Augsburg
- Ratold of Strasbourg
- Gebhard I of Speyer
- Arn of Würzburg
- Liutbert of Münster
- Theoderic of Minden
- Hildegrim II of Halberstadt
- Liuthard of Paderborn
- Gerolf of Verden
- Egibert of Osnabrück
- Esso of Chur
- Embricho of Regensburg
- Bernard, chorepiscopus
- Heito of Reichenau, abbot and priest
- Adalgar of Corvey, abbot and priest
- Theotroch of Lorsch, abbot and priest
- Thioto of Fulda, abbot and priest
- Brunward of Hersfeld, abbot
- Ascherich of Ellwangen, abbot
- Egilbert (of Utrecht?), abbot
