= Bernard (son of Charles the Fat) =

Frankish noble (c. 870 – 891/2)

Bernard or Bernhard (c. 870 – 891/2) was the only child of Emperor Charles the Fat. He was born of an unknown concubine and was thus considered illegitimate. Charles tried to make him his heir, but failed in two attempts.

Charles tried to have Bernard recognised as his heir in 885, but met the opposition of several bishops. He had the support of Pope Adrian III, whom he invited to an assembly in Worms in October 885, but who died on the way, just after crossing the river Po. Adrian was going to depose the obstructing bishops, as Charles doubted he could do this himself, and legitimise Bernard. Based on the disfavouring attitude of the chronicler of the Mainz continuation of the Annales Fuldenses, the chief of Charles' opponents in the matter was probably Liutbert, Archbishop of Mainz. Because Charles had called together the "bishops and counts of Gaul" as well as the pope to meet him at Worms, it seems likely that he planned to make Bernard King of Lotharingia. Notker the Stammerer, who considered Bernard as a possible heir, wrote in his Deeds of Charlemagne: "I will not tell you [Charles the Fat] of this [the Viking sack of the Abbey of Prüm] until I see your little son Bernard with a sword girt to his thigh." Perhaps Notker was awaiting Bernard's kingship, when Prüm would be avenged.

After the failure of his first attempt, Charles set about to try again, apparently having given up on having any legitimate children with his wife, Richardis. He had the term proles (offspring) inserted into his charters as it had not been in previous years, probably because he desired to legitimise Bernard. In early 886, Charles met the new Pope, Stephen V, and probably negotiated for the recognition of his son as his heir. When Stephen cancelled a planned meeting at Waiblingen on 30 April 887, Charles probably abandoned his plans for Bernard and instead adopted Louis of Provence as his son at Kirchen in May. It is possible, however, that the agreement with Louis was only designed to engender support for Bernard's subkingship in Lotharingia.

After his father's death, Bernard became the focus of revolt for some Alemannian magnates. In 890, he rebelled against Arnulf of Carinthia and prevented the king from going into Italy as requested by Pope Stephen V. Bernard had the support of Count Ulrich of the Linzgau and Argengau and Bernard, Abbot of Saint Gall. Probably, he fled Alemannia for Italy and the protection of Arnulf's rival, King Guy, as recorded by the late medieval historian Gobelinus, who may have had a lost Carolingian work as his source. By the winter of 891/2, Bernard had returned to Alemannia. The revolt was finally put down by Solomon III, Bishop of Constance, and Hatto, Abbot of Reichenau. Arnulf entered Alemannia in the summer to redistribute lands. Bernard was killed by Rudolf, Duke of Rhaetia, and only then did the unrest in Alemannia cease.

These events are not mentioned in the main East Frankish source, the Annals of Fulda, rather they come from brief notices in the Annales Alamannici and Annales Laubacenses, which record that in 890, "Bernard, Charles's son, barely escaped the net", and in 891 (which possibly should be 892), he "was killed by Rudolf", without specifying who Rudolf was.

== Sources ==
- Offergeld, Thilo (2001). Reges pueri: Das Königtum Minderjähriger im frühen Mittelalter. Vol. 2 vols. Hanover.
- Reuter, Timothy (1991). Germany in the Early Middle Ages, c. 800–1056. London: Longman.
- Reuter, Timothy, ed. (1992). The Annals of Fulda. Manchester Medieval Series, Ninth-Century Histories, Volume II. Manchester University Press.
- MacLean, Simon (2003). Kingship and Politics in the Late Ninth Century: Charles the Fat and the End of the Carolingian Empire. Cambridge University Press.
