= Rudolf, Duke of Rhaetia =

9th century Duke of Rhaetia

Rudolf (Latin: Ruadolfus) was a Frankish nobleman of the House of Welf, attested as the duke of Rhaetia in 890–892. He probably succeeded his cousin Conrad (died 876) as duke. He was one of fives sons of Rudolf, count of Ponthieu, and hroudun. He is sometimes numbered Rudolf II to distinguish him from his father.

In 864, Conrad was described as "duke of the Rhaetians and a part of the Jura" (Raeticarum vel Jurensium partium dux). In 890, Rudolf was described as simply "duke of the Rhaetians" (dux Raetionorum), although this might not be taken to exclude his rule in part of the Jura as well.

Between 870 and 885, Rudolf was count in the Thurgau and Zürichgau in Rhaetia. He may also have been count in Augstgau, east of the Lech in Bavaria, between 870 and 891. Although it is probable, it cannot be proved that the same Rudolf held each of these counties or that he was the same person as the later duke of Rhaetia; the evidence is too sparse.

He supported Arnulf of Carinthia's claim to the kingdom of East Francia after the deposition of Charles the Fat in 887. He was a close relative of the Ahalolfings, a prominent family in Alemannia. Richardis, the repudiated wife of Charles the Fat, was an Ahalolfing. It is possible that Rudolf's support for Arnulf stemmed from the treatment Richardis had received from Charles.

In 890, Charles's son Bernard rebelled against Arnulf in Alemannia. He was forced to flee to Italy later that year, but he returned in the winter of 891–892. At that time, Rudolf killed him; how and in what circumstances are unknown. These events are not mentioned in the main East Frankish source, the Annals of Fulda, rather they come from brief notices in the Annales Alamannici and Annales Laubacenses, which record that in 890, "Bernard, Charles's son, barely escaped the net", and in 891 (which possibly should be 892), he "was killed by Rudolf", without specifying who Rudolf was.

By 903 Rudolf had been succeeded in Rhaetia by Burchard I, who would expand ducal authority, leading to the creation of the duchy of Swabia. Rudolf was not related to Burchard, whose family, the Hunfridings, were Alemannian rivals of Rudolf's relatives, the Ahalolfings.

== Sources ==
- Borgolte, Michael (1986). Die Grafen Alemanniens in merowingischer und karolingischer Zeit: Eine Prosopographie. Thorbecke.
- Fleckenstein, Josef (1957). "Über die Herkunft der Welfen und ihre Anfänge in Süddeutschland". In Gerd Tellenbach (ed.). Studien und Vorarbeiten zur Geschichte des grossfränkischen und frühdeutschen Adels. E. Albert. pp. 7–136.
- Jackman, Donald C. (2008). Ius hereditarium Encountered, II: Approaches to Reginlint. Editions Enlaplage.
- Offergeld, Thilo (2001). Reges pueri: Das Königtum Minderjähriger im frühen Mittelalter. Vol. 2 vols. Hanover.
- Reuter, Timothy, ed. (1992). The Annals of Fulda. Manchester University Press.
- Schmid, Karl (1986). "Von Hunfrid zu Burkard: Bemerkungen zur rätischen Geschichte aus der Sicht von Gedenkbucheinträgen". In Ursus Brunold; Lothar Deplazes (eds.). Geschichte und Kultur Churrätiens: Festschrift für Pater Iso Müller OSB zu seinem 85. Geburtstag. Disentis. pp. 181–209.
- Schneidmüller, Bernd (2000). Die Welfen: Herrschaft und Erinnerung (819–1252). Kohlhammer.
- Tellenbach, Gerd (1957). "Exkurs über die ältesten Welfen im West- und Ostfrankenreich". In Gerd Tellenbach (ed.). Studien und Vorarbeiten zur Geschichte des grossfränkischen und frühdeutschen Adels. E. Albert. pp. 335–340.
