= Judith of Bavaria (died 843) =

Carolingian empress from 819 to 840

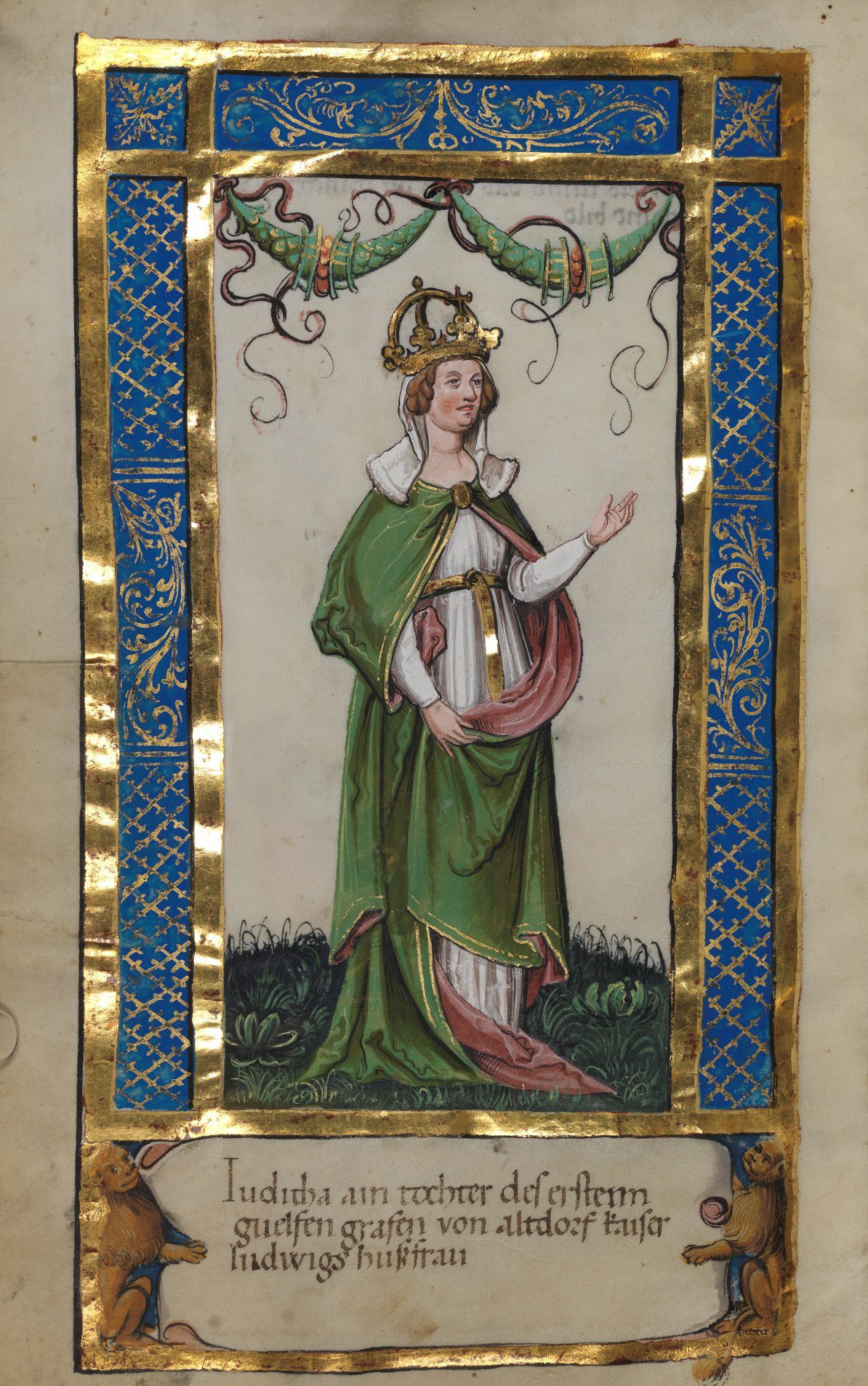

Empress consort of the Carolingian Empire
- Tenure: 819 – 20 June 840
- Born: c. 797–805
- Died: 19 April 843 (aged 37–46); Tours
- Burial: Basilica of Saint Martin, Tours
- Spouse: Louis the Pious
- Issue: Gisela; Charles
- House: Elder House of Welf
- Father: Welf
- Mother: Hedwig, Duchess of Bavaria

Judith of Bavaria (c. 797-805 – 19 April 843) was the Carolingian empress as the second wife of Louis the Pious. Marriage to Louis marked the beginning of her rise as an influential figure in the Carolingian court. She had two children with Louis, Gisela and Charles the Bald. The birth of her son led to a major dispute over the imperial succession, and tensions between her and Charles' half-brothers from Louis' first marriage. She eventually fell from grace when Charles' wife, Ermentrude of Orléans, rose to power. She was buried in 843 in Tours.

== Early life ==
Judith was the daughter of Count Welf of Bavaria and Saxon noblewoman Hedwig. No surviving sources provide a record of Judith's exact date and year of birth. Judith was probably born around 797-805. Most girls in the Carolingian world were married in adolescence, with twelve years as the minimum age; her marriage to the 41-year-old King Louis occurred in 819, when she was probably between 13 and 22 years old.

Though the Welfs were noble, they were not part of the '"Imperial Aristocracy'" (Reichsaristokratie) that dominated high office throughout the Carolingian empire. The Welf clan's leaders, having lost influence in their home region of Alemannia (present-day southwestern Germany and northern Switzerland) eventually rose to power through cementing familial ties with the Carolingian Imperial Aristocracy in the 770s. Nonetheless, they remained a part of the upper aristocracy (Hochadel) of their region, given the numerous appearances of the noble titles of ducal (duke) and comital (counts) in primary sources. This noble status made Judith a suitable marriage prospect for the imperial family, and the Welf clan as a whole saw its prestige and power increase after Judith's marriage to the Carolingian emperor Louis the Pious in 819.

== Courtship and marriage ==
After the death on 3 October 818 of Louis' first wife Queen Ermengard, mother of his sons Louis the German, Peppin and Lothar, Louis was urged by his counselors to remarry. Shortly after Christmas in 819 he married Judith in Aachen (North Rhine-Westphalia, Germany). Like many of the royal marriages of the time Judith was selected, prior to the marriage through a bridal show. It is at the bride show that, at the age of forty one, Louis chose the young Judith "after inspecting noble maidens who were brought to his court from all districts". In Frankish society, only women of the nobility were eligible to compete; this specific trait is highlighted in the Regesta Imperii, where Judith is referred to as stemming from a noble lineage (Edlen Geschlecht). Contemporary witnesses such as Ermoldus Nigellus, Walahfrid Strabo, and Louis' biographer Thegan attributed Judith's selection to her extraordinary beauty, intelligence, and musical ability. It is just as likely, however, that Louis was attracted to the geographical and political advantages offered by Judith's family. While scholars differ as to whether the Welfs were of Frankish or Alemannian descent, it is clear that they controlled significant territories to the east of the Rhine, and were predominant political actors in both Bavaria and Alemannia. This fact would have made them desirable allies for Louis, since any military campaign in the empire's eastern frontiers would require the emperor to travel through this region. By marrying Judith, in other words, the emperor would effectively gain friends and allies, an important military and political stronghold, and the support of the nobility in that region.

Location of Aachen in Germany

Judith married Louis in 819 in Aachen. It was not uncommon that brides were given some form of dowry upon marrying into royalty. Judith's marriage was no exception to this practice and she received, according to sources, the monastery San Salvatore, which was located in Brescia (in the region of Lombardy in northern Italy). The monastery of San Salvatore and all the assets that fall under its jurisdiction, would fall under the protection of the King. Although, according to modern sources, the dowry was indicative that the marriage was in fact a "Vollehe" (full marriage), it did not mean that the dowry would remain solely within the possession of the Queen in perpetuity; rather it could be taken from her depending on the political climate, as would later be the case in Judith's life, after her fall from power and influence.

In later Carolingian societies the act of coronation was closely tied with the marriage. It was only upon the completion of the marriage that queenship and thus legitimacy was bestowed. When Louis married his first wife Ermengard in 794, she was crowned and called "augusta", a title that harkens back to the Roman "augustus". This bestowed on Ermengard the title of empress as it did Judith when she married Louis and was "crowned as empress and acclaimed augusta by all".

== Queenship ==
Historical sources show a gap in information available on Judith in the four years between her marriage in 819 and the birth of Charles in 823. The most likely cause of this gap is that Judith would only rise to historical prominence when she became involved in her son's, Charles the Bald, life as an advocate for his career as successor to the throne. However, various sources like the Capitulare de villis and the De ordine palatii of Hincmar of Reims can be drawn upon to provide information on roles and responsibilities that Judith would have most likely played in court. Specifically, the Capitulare de villis and the De ordine palatii define the role and consequently the realm of influence of the empress to that of the court. If these documents are indicative of the empress's role in the court and palace in general, then it may be reasonably inferred what roles Judith would have acted in. Sources tell us that Judith's and the steward of the court's (Kämmerer) duties included, among others: caring that she, her servants and the King himself, particularly his jewelry, looked presentable and of appropriate appearance, overseeing the transfer of the yearly tribute (Abgabe der Vasallen) and ensuring that the emperor was free to focus on ruling the kingdom, without distraction of minor details like the court's appearance. It is not to be inferred from this brief sketch, however, that her role was in any sense superfluous and relegated to the realm of aesthetics. She had a working relationship with the Kämmerer of the court, (the top administrator for the incomes, goods and running of the household), which means that she was in an influential position when it came to the functioning and the running of the court. Freculf of Lisieux dedicated the second half of his Twelve Books of Histories to her, praising her erudition, pointing to her role as a patron of culture and learning.

It is not unlikely that, in order to complete these tasks, Judith would have had her own court personnel. This was not an uncommon phenomenon, it having existed according to sources since the time of the Merovingians. Having her own administration was not only instrumentally important in ensuring a smooth running of the court and the daily affairs of the palace, but also a political necessity. The King and Queen were technically seen as a single entity, as is the case in the Capitulare de villis. Her command was therefore no less significant or important than that of the King. However, in time of separation, be it war, sickness or pregnancy, this single ruling couple/entity would be divided. Consequently, when Louis endeavoured on his campaign in 824 against the Bretons or a similar campaign in the same region in 830, Judith would not only have to take care of the running of the courtly society, but also step in as a representative of the King. In this capacity she would come to be involved in the politics of the realm. But she also had other avenues to influence the politics of the realm and the court. It is not unreasonable to consider that she had some influence acting as a counsel woman for her husband. Judith's very position and proximity to the emperor as his wife meant she was in immediate proximity to him and consequently had the ability and opportunity to influence the decisions of her husband. Judith's role and prominence in court would see a dramatic rise after the birth of her son, as she sought to establish a political and courtly base for Charles, against the threat that Lothar posed for his succession.

== Children ==
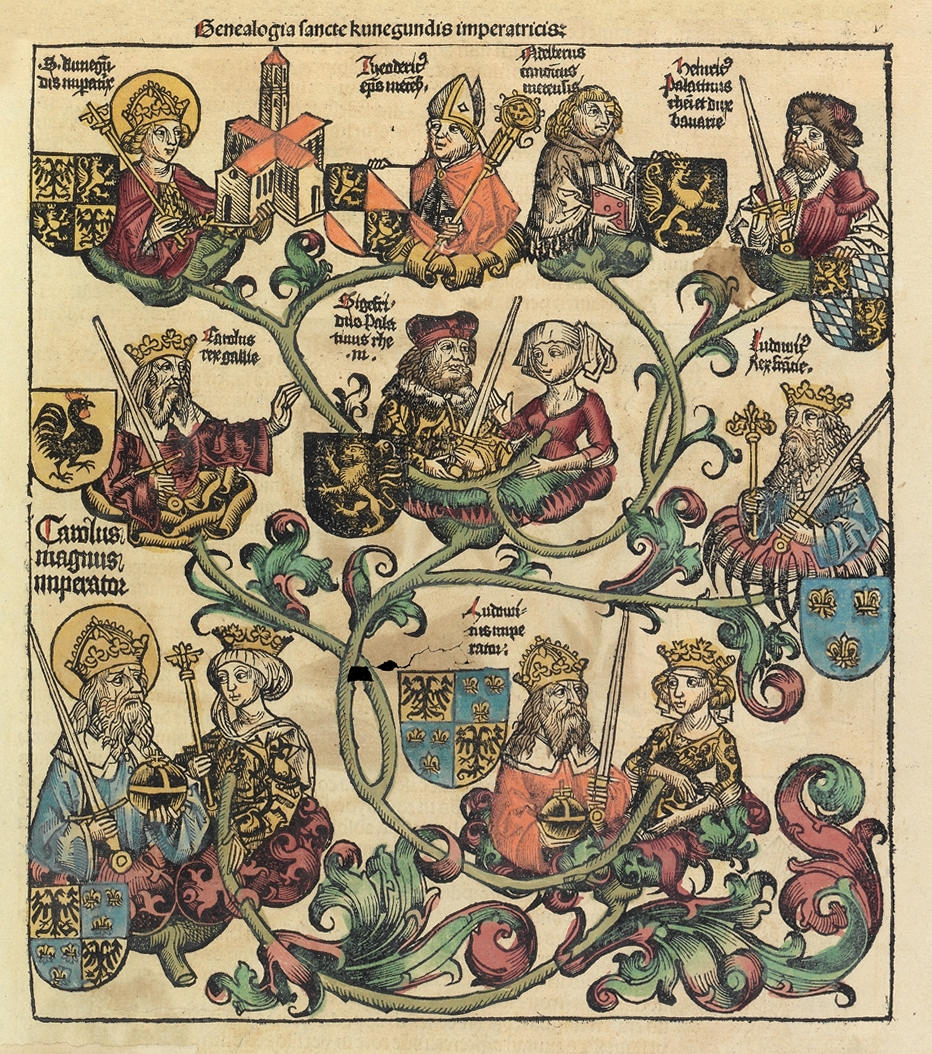
Family Tree of Charlemagne

Judith had two children with Louis. Her first child was a daughter named Gisela, born in 820. Gisela would eventually be married off by Judith to Eberhard of Friuli, a significant supporter of Lothar. Gisela was the mother of Berengar I.

After having spent most of her second pregnancy in Frankfurt, she had another child named Charles, who was born on 13 June 823. More commonly known as "Charles the Bald", he would eventually become emperor, following in the footsteps of his father Louis. The birth of Charles had a significant effect on Judith's life, because Charles was the only male heir of Louis' second marriage. His birth put the Ordinatio Imperii and its designations for successor under question. The ordinatio imperii outlined that only a full heir could rule, but since there were several viable candidates that met the requirements, (mainly Lothar, Peppin and Louis the German from the marriage to Ermengard and Charles from the marriage to Judith) an eventual strain on rightful succession was inevitable. Consequently, it became of the utmost importance for Judith to secure the throne for her son and protect him from the attacks and threats that his paternal brothers posed. Lothar, being the most prominent and the oldest of Ermengard's children, presented the greatest threat to Judith and Charles. Yet, realizing this, Judith selected Lothar as Charles' godfather. This strategic move meant Charles would have a political tie in the eventual disputes succession that would inevitably follow Louis' death.

== Civil war ==
Carolingian empire 828

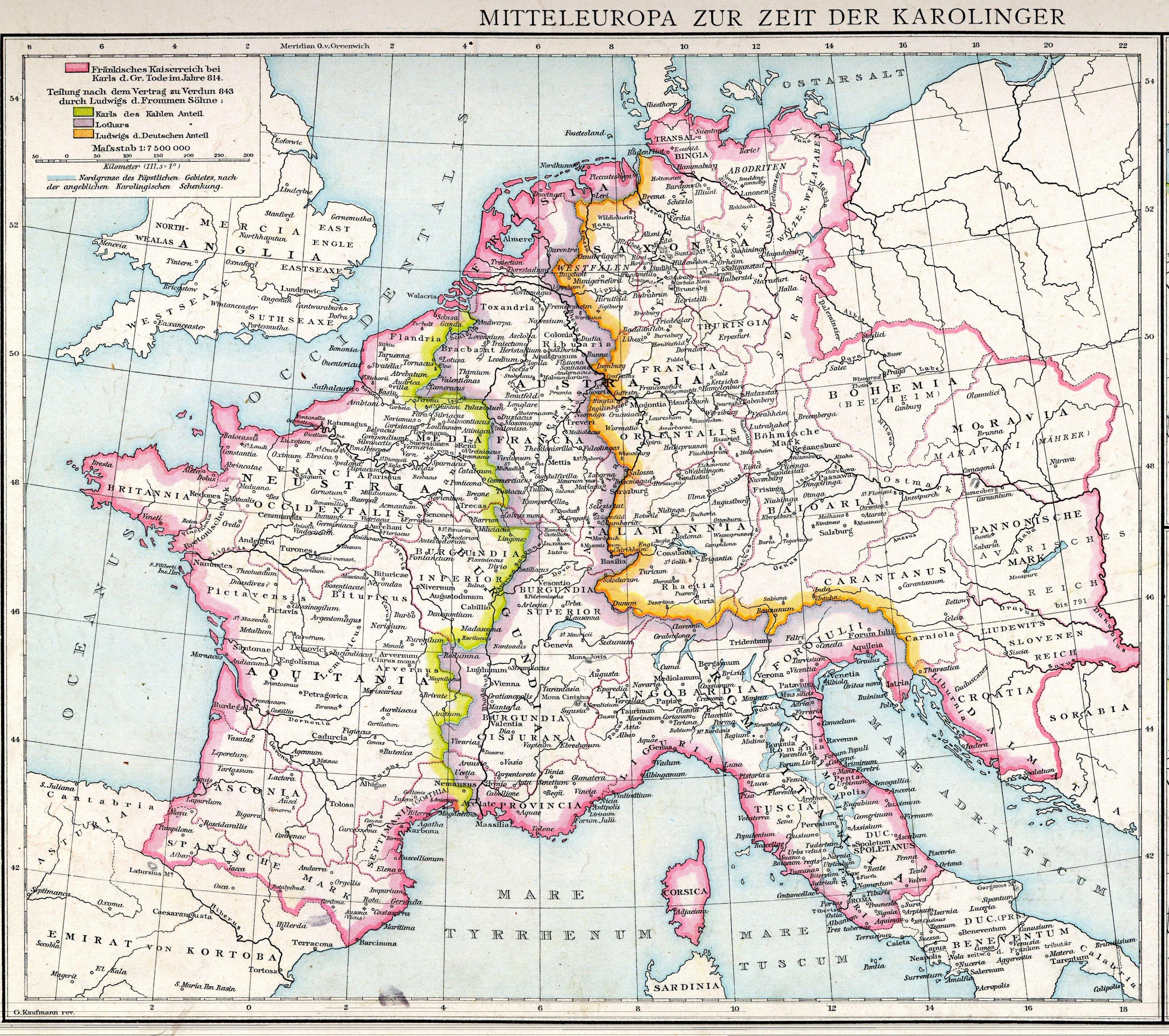
Carolingian territorial divisions, 843

=== Imperial succession and partition ===
On 9 April 817 a timber roof collapsed on Louis and his men in Aachen. The event shocked Louis and led the emperor to reconsider the distribution of his power and succession for his heirs. The ordinatio Imperii was a reconfiguration and re-imagining of in the division of Charlemagne's inheritance, which he had always envisioned but never fully implemented. The ordinatio imperii stated that Louis oldest son Lothar would become co-emperor and would receive the whole of Francia. It also stated that Lothar's younger brothers, Pippin, aged 19, and Louis the German, aged 10, would inherit Aquitaine and Bavaria respectively (the regna).

A major sticking point that concerned Lothar was Louis' nineteen-year-old nephew Bernard of Italy getting in the way of his eventual rise to power. Bernard had been ruling Italy since 810. Yet, the ordinatio imperii did not specify Bernard as the immediate successor and continued ruler of Italy. Consequently, Bernard, alarmed by the fact that his future inheritance was at stake, rose up against Louis. The rebellion was swiftly quelled by Louis' forces. Bernard was blinded and would eventually die on 17 April 818

The birth of Charles as well as Lothar's marriage in 821 meant that two imperial households were now vying for control. The strain over how to interpret the ordinatio imperii coupled with the fact that Judith would most likely outlive her husband, meant that it became imperative for Judith to establish a political base of her own, not only for her own safety and the continuation of her queenship, but also for the safety of her son.

In a letter written by Agobard of Lyons to Louis, Agobard articulates the way in which Louis strove to establish an orderly settlement between his four sons. Here we see that Ermengarde's son Lothar is granted more power than Louis' other sons, jeopardising the future of both Judith and Charles:

And thus you carried out everything that should have been done in such a situation, with such faith, with such hope, that no one would doubt that this was infused and inspired in you by God. You assigned parts of your kingdom to the rest of your sons but – that the kingdom might be one and not three – you set [the son] whom you made the sharer in your title, over the others. And then you ordered these actions to be written down and, once written, to be signed and corroborated. Then, you sent [the son, Lothar] who had been made consort in your title to Rome, your deeds to be approved and confirmed by the highest pontiff. Then you ordered all to swear that they would all follow and preserve such an election and division. No one considered this oath irrelevant or worthy of scorn but rather timely and legitimate, since it seemed to pertain to peace and concord. And over the course of time, whenever and wherever imperial letters were sent, they contained the names of both emperors.

— Agobard of Lyons

=== Advocating for Charles ===
Most information on Judith surrounds the activities for her son and her attempts to ensure his succession to the throne. Their political futures depended on each other; if Judith were widowed, her future as an empress could potentially be threatened by stepsons that no longer had familial or political concerns for her wellbeing. Outlined in a letter to Pope Nicholas I Judith, upon Charles's birth, sent a ring to Ebbo, the archbishop of Rheims, asking him to pray for the health of Charles, but also promising that if he ever sent the ring back to her in times of trouble she would help him. Politically this move is significant given that Ebbo was one of the most powerful people in the land and a "milkbrother" and friend of Louis. This marks a distinct effort on the part of Judith to bolster her influence and secure the political future of her son.

The poem by a court poet Ermoldus Nigellus, Poem in Honor of Louis, provides insight into Judith's influence over her son Charles. The scene describes Judith and Charles interacting while Louis goes on a hunt:

Judith, who has with her the young Charles; in a twinkling she passes by, placing her faith in her feet-- if flight does not give her aid, surely she will perish. Seeing this, the young Charles begs for a horse, for he desires to do as his father does; earnestly he pleads for weapons, for a quiver and quick-striking arrows, and wishes to go in pursuit, as his father so often does. He pours prayers upon prayers, but his beautiful mother prevents him from leaving, and refuses his wishes. If his teacher and his mother do not restrain the impetuous youth (as youths are wont to do), he shall chase after on foot.

— Ermoldus Nigellus, Agobard of Lyons

Not only does this highlight Judith's role as an influential force in Charles' life, but it also establishes an ambitious young Charles as a son that follows in the footsteps of his father Louis.

Other poetry by Ermoldus from 826 describes Judith following her son in procession, flanked on either side by the magnates Count Hugh of Tours, who was Lothar's father-in-law, and Count Matfrid of Orleans. Given that both magnates had extremely close ties with Lothar, this suggests Judith was already attempting to cultivate Lothar's sympathies and place herself and her son in a politically favourable position.

The three eldest sons of Louis the Pious revolted against their father in order to control the ordering of the Carolingian succession. It was Judith's dominance and control of the court, thereby being able to dictate who saw Louis and influence him, that was the focus of their revolt. In order to seize control of the king and consequently the Carolingian succession they had to replace the current court, controlled by Judith, with their own. Judith was accused of having an incestuous relationship with Louis the Pious's godson, Bernard of Septimania (who was the lynchpin of her court). This led to her capture and exile to Italy at the nunnery of Saint Radegund in 830. After the crisis she returned to Aachen and continued her effort to see that Charles would take control.

Given Judith's role in court and her rise in power, especially in the waning year of Louis's life, the political ties that Judith had built in court became the political ties of Charles. These included, amongst others, Walahfrid, Lupus of Ferrières, the palace clerics Prudentius, Wenilo and Berno, and the seneschal Adalard.

Several marriages in 839 sought to solidify a future for Charles and an entente with Lothar. The first was the marriage of Gisele, the daughter of Louis and Judith, to Eberhard, the duke of Friuli, who was a leading supporter of Lothar. A second such marriage was that between Judith's brother Conrad with Adelaide, Lothar's sister in law.

Judith also collaborated with the magnates that worked on the will of Louis in order to promote Charles. Fearing that Louis would die before the matter was settled, Judith advised that Louis take to his aid one of his three sons (Pippin, Lothar or Louis) in order to unite Charles and one of the brothers in mutual interest should a revolt happen after Louis's death.

After Louis's death Judith helped and assisted Charles in his campaigns against Lothar. She sent troops to assist Charles in his endeavour to secure Aquitaine and the majority of Francia in order to reduce the number of competitors. She also exercised influence over him. When archbishop George of Ravenna was taken prisoner after a battle in which 40,000 men fell on the side of Lothar and Pippin, Judith counselled Charles to be merciful towards the archbishop, which Andreas Agnellus of Ravenna recalled as For my part I’ll let you go—as my mother tells me to.

=== Scandals ===
However, the rise of Judith's power, influence and activity in the court sparked resentment towards her. Agobard of Lyons, a supporter of Lothar, wrote two tracts Two Books in Favor of the Sons and Against Judith the Wife of Louis in 833. These tracts were meant as propaganda against Judith from the court of Lothar in order to undermine her court and influence. The tracts themselves attack her character, claiming her to be of a cunning and underhanded nature and of corrupting her husband. These attacks were predominantly anti-feminist in nature. When Louis still did not sever marital ties with Judith, Agobard claimed that Judith's extramarital affairs were carried out "first secretly and later impudently". Paschasius Radbertus accused Judith by associating her with the engagement in debauchery and witchcraft, of filling the palace with "soothsayers... seers and mutes as well as dream interpreters and those who consult entrail, indeed all those skilled in malign craft".

Characterized as a Jezebel and a Justina, Judith was accused by one of her enemies, Paschasius Radbertus, of engaging in debauchery and witchcraft with her purported lover, Count Bernard of Septimania, Louis' chamberlain and trusted adviser. This portrayal and image stands in contrast to poems about Judith. The poems depict her as "a second biblical Judith, a Mary sister of Aaron in her musical abilities, a Saphho, a prophetess, cultivated, chaste, intelligent, pious, strong in spirit, and sweet in conversation".

However, Judith also garnered devotion and respect. Hrabanus Maurus wrote a dedicatory letter to Judith, exalting her "praiseworthy intellect" and for her "good works". The letter commends her in the turbulent times amidst battles, wishing that she may see victory amidst the struggles she is facing. It also implores her "to follow through with a good deed once you have begun it" and "to improve yourself at all times". Most strikingly the letter wishes Judith to look to the biblical Queen Esther, the wife of Xerxes I as inspiration and as a role model

Likewise, O queen, forever keep your eyes of your heart fixed upon Queen Esther as a model of dutiful and holy behaviour so that by equalling her holiness you might be able to climb from this earthly kingdom to the heights of the heavenly kingdom

— Hrabanus Maurus

=== Disgrace and exile ===
Judith was left alone in 830 in Aachen, as Louis decided to undertake a campaign into Brittany. The campaign itself, however, was greatly opposed, because of its difficulties. Some of the magnates attempted to alter the attitudes of the people and turn them against Louis. The plot was to depose Louis the Pious, "to destroy their stepmother and kill Bernard".

Prior to Easter Week in 830 (17–24 April) Pippin, with Lothar's consent, and with a large proportion of the people "took away from the Emperor his royal power, and also his wife". Judith was veiled ("the female equivalent of tonsuring rival claimants to the throne") and sent to the convent of St Radegund at Poitiers in the same year.

At an assembly held on 1 October at Nijmegen, between the Emperor, the Saxons and East Franks, it was adjudged, by "all the bishops, abbots, counts and other Franks" that Judith, even though she was taken unjustly, should be brought back and made to stand trial for any crime she may have committed and "undergo the judgment of the Franks".

In 831, around 1 February Judith stood trial at the assembly arranged by the Emperor. At the assembly she "declared her willingness to purge herself on all the charges levelled against her". No one was found in the general assembly who wanted to charge her for any crime. She purged herself, by the customs of the Franks, of all the things that she had been accused of.

== Later life ==
In 833 Louis heard news of his sons, Pippin, Lothar and Louis the German, allying in order to orchestrate a revolt against him. Louis failed to prevent the revolt and was overthrown, resulting in Lothar seizing power. For Judith the coup resulted in her exile in northern Italy at the civitas of Tortona. Louis spent the next year in Aachen as a captive of Lothar. Pippin and Louis the German, however, condemned the treatment of their father by Lothar and in 834 summoned armies from Aquitaine, Bavarians, Austrasians, Saxons, Alemans and the Franks to rise up against Lothar. Hearing of the vast armies approaching him, Lothar fled, leaving his father behind. Louis thus regained control and offered to forgive Lothar for his actions. Lothar, however, scorned the offer. It was during this turbulent political to-and-fro that followers of Louis the Pious who were in Italy, Bishop Ratold, Count Boniface and Pippin among them, heard of a plot to kill Judith. With their help Judith escaped and returned to Aachen in the same year.

Louis died in 840 at his palace in Ingelheim, leaving Judith a widow. She, however, continued to support her son Charles in his military campaigns and endeavours, gathering troops from Aquentine in 841. In April of that same year, Charles received his crown and all of his royal attire, which contemporaries of the time herald as a divine act. Most likely, however, Judith was well aware of Charles's location and had sent the royal artifacts to meet up with her son.

Charles married Ermentrude in 842 and fathered a daughter, Judith of Flanders, in 844, named after his mother. This marriage, however, proved disastrous for Judith's career, power and influence. With the introduction of a new queen, Judith became of ex officio importance, resulting in her forced retirement as well as withdrawal of the lands and wealth under her control. Her health began to fail in 842, and she died on 19 April 843 in Tours, outliving her husband by three years, after more than a year of ill health, including coughing and dizziness. It is believed that she was around 46 years of age when she died, her husband had been closer to 62. She was buried at the Basilica of Saint Martin, Tours.

== Sources ==
- Hrabanus Maurus (856), Dedicatory letter to the Expositio in librum Judith (in Migne, Patrologia Latina, vol. 109; transl. Sean Gilsdorf
- Agobard of Lyons: On the Division of the Empire (to Louis the Pious) c. 830
- Nelson, Janet L. The Annals of St-Bertin. Manchester: Manchester UP, 1991. Print. p. 21-24 (830-831), 27 (833), 29-30 (834)
- Koch, Armin. Kaiserin Judith: Eine Politische Biographie. Husum: Matthiesen, 2005. Print. p. 26, 27, 28, 35, 37, 39, 44, 77, 130
- Rogers, Barbara, Bernhard W. Scholz, and Nithardus. Carolingian Chronicles, Royal Frankish Annals Nithard’s Histories. Ann Arbor: Univ. of Michigan, 1972. Print. p. 105 (819), 149 (841)
- Stafford, Pauline. Queens, Concubines and Dowagers: The King's Wife in the Early Middle Ages. London, Leicester UP, 1998. Print. p. 18, 19, 20, 93, 94 130, 145, 166, 180
- Depreux, Philippe. Prosopographie De L'entourage De Louis Le Pieux (781-840). Sigmaringen: Thorbecke, 1997. Print.
- Elizabeth Ward: Caesar's Wife. The Career of the Empress Judith 819–829. In: Peter Goodman, Roger Collins p. 214
- Wemple, Suzanne Fonay. Women in Frankish Society: Marriage and the Cloister, 500 to 900. Philadelphia: University of Pennsylvania, 1981. Print. p. 80, 90
- Nelson, Janet L. Charles the Bald. London: Longman, 1992. Print.p. 74-75 (818), 93, 98, 100, 116, 119
- Lupus, and Graydon W. Regenos. The Letters of Lupus of Ferrières. The Hague: Martinus Nijhoff, 1966. Print.
- Regesta Imperii: http://www.regesta-imperii.de
- Ermoldus Nigellus, Poem in Honor of Louis, Sean Gilsdorf
- Geneviève Bührer-Thierry, The Adulterous Queen, Translated by Sean Gilsdorf from Geneviève Bührer-Thierry, La reine adultère, Cahiers de civilisation médiévale 35 (1992): 299–312. Translations of original texts follow those made by Bührer-Thierry

Judith of Bavaria (died 843) Elder House of Welf Born: 795 or 805 Died: 19 April 843
Royal titles
Preceded by Ermengarde of Hesbaye	Carolingian empress 819–840	Succeeded by Ermengarde of Tours
Preceded by Ermengarde of Hesbaye	Queen of the Franks; 819–840	Succeeded by Emma of Altdorf; Ermentrude of Orléans
