= Hatto I =

- Archbishop of Mainz
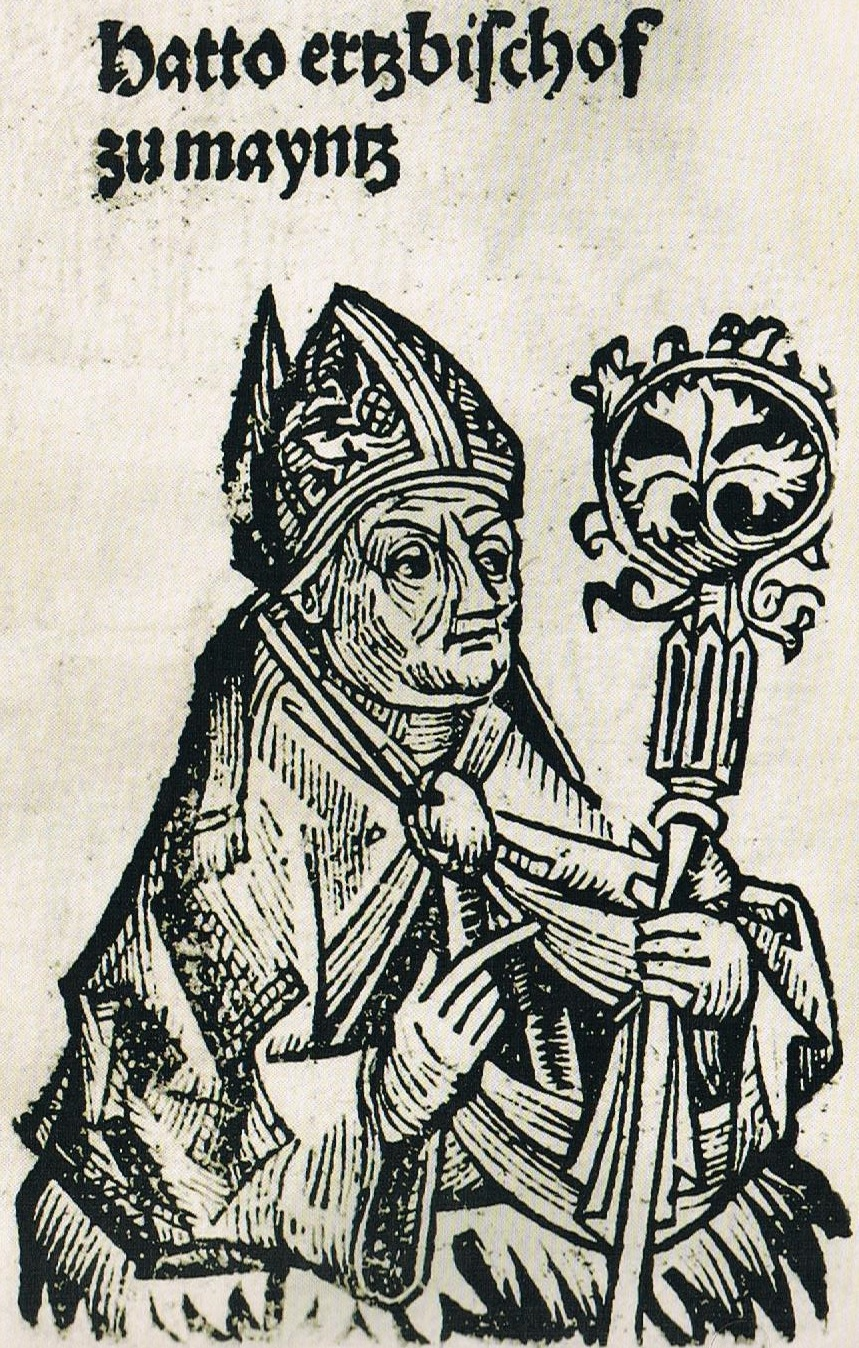
- Church: Catholic Church
- Diocese: Electorate of Mainz
- In office: 891–913

Personal details
- Born: c. 850
- Died: 15 May 913

Hatto I (c. 850 – 15 May 913) was Archbishop of Mainz (Mayence) from 891 until his death.

== Family and early life ==
Hatto belonged to a Swabian family, and was probably educated at the monastery of Reichenau, of which he became abbot in 888. He was also abbot of Ellwangen Abbey.

== Counsellor of Arnulf of Carinthia ==
Hatto soon became known to the German king, Arnulf, who appointed him archbishop of Mainz in 891, and he became such a trustworthy and loyal counsellor that he was popularly called the heart of the king. He presided over the important synod at Tribur in 895 and accompanied the king to Italy in 894 and 895, where he was received with great favor by Pope Formosus. In 899, when Arnulf died, Hatto became regent of the Empire and guardian of the young king, Louis the Child, whose authority he compelled Zwentibold, duke of Lorraine, an illegitimate son of Arnulf, to recognize.

== Execution of Adalbert of Babenberg ==
During these years Hatto did not neglect his own interests, for in 896 he secured for himself the abbey of Ellwangen and in 898 that of Lorsch. He assisted the Franconian family of the Conradines in its feud with the Babenbergs for supremacy in Franconia; after the battle of Fritzlar on 9 September 906 between the Babenbergs and Conradines he arranged for the capture and execution of Count Adalbert of Babenberg, breaking his promise of safe conduct.

== Failed attempt to assassinate Henry the Fowler ==
Hatto retained his influence during the entire reign of Louis the Child and on the king's death in 911 was prominent in securing the election of Conrad, duke of Franconia, to the vacant throne. When trouble arose between Conrad and Henry the Fowler, duke of Saxony, afterwards King Henry I, the attitude of Conrad was ascribed by the Saxons to the influence of Hatto, who wished to prevent Henry from securing authority in Thuringia, where the see of Mainz had extensive possessions. He was accused of complicity in a plot to murder Henry, who in return ravaged the archiepiscopal lands in Saxony and Thuringia.

== Legends about his death at Mount Etna ==
Hatto died on 15 May 913, one legend saying he was struck by lightning, and another that he was thrown alive by the devil into the crater of Mount Etna. His memory was long regarded in Saxony with great abhorrence, and stories of cruelty and treachery gathered round his name.

== Legend of the Mouse Tower ==
The legend of the Mouse Tower at Bingen is connected with Hatto I and Hatto II, who was archbishop of Mainz from 968 to 970. This latter Hatto built the church of St. George on the island of Reichenau, was generous to the see of Mainz and to the abbeys of Fulda and Reichenau, and was a patron of the chronicler Regino, abbot of Prum.

== See also ==
- Council of Tribur
- Southey's God's Judgement on a Wicked Bishop.

Preceded by Sunderhold	Archbishop of Mainz; 891–913	Succeeded by Herigar
