= Pepin I of Aquitaine =

9th-century Frankish king

Pepin I
- King of the Franks of Aquitaine
- Denier struck in the name of Pepin I, issued around 818 and minted in Bourges.

King of Aquitaine
- Reign: 817–832 (first time)
- Predecessor: Louis the Pious
- Successor: Charles the Bald
- Reign: 834–838 (second time)
- Predecessor: Charles the Bald
- Successor: Charles the Bald
- Born: c. 797
- Died: 13 december 838; Poitiers, Kingdom of Aquitaine
- Spouse: Ingeltrude or Ringarde
- Issue: Charles; Pepin II of Aquitaine
- House: Carolingian
- Father: Louis the Pious
- Mother: Ermengarde of Hesbaye
- Religion: Christianity

Pepin I or Pepin I of Aquitaine (French: Pépin; 797 – 13 December 838) was King of Aquitaine and Duke of Maine.

Pepin was the second son of Emperor Louis the Pious and his first wife, Ermengarde of Hesbaye. When his father assigned to each of his sons a kingdom (within the Empire) in August 817, he received Aquitaine, which had been Louis's own subkingdom during his father Charlemagne's reign. Around this time, the only coinage issue bearing Pepin's name was struck, likely at Louis's behest.

Ermoldus Nigellus was his court poet and accompanied him on a campaign into Brittany in 824.

Around 827-8, Louis sent Pepin to support Bernard of Septimania against an incursion into the Iberian March, supported by the Umayyad ruler Abd al-Rahman. Pepin and his army failed to reach the March in time to make a difference, for which the co-leaders of his army, Hugh of Tours and Matfrid of Orléans were deposed.

== Rebellions ==
Pepin rebelled in 830, alongside his elder brother Lothar I, perhaps in reaction to Louis's deposition of Hugh and Matfrid. He took an army of Gascons with him and marched all the way to Paris, with the support of the Neustrians. His father marched back from a campaign in Brittany all the way to Compiègne, where Pepin surrounded his forces and captured him. The rebellion, however, broke up, as Louis acceded to the rebels' demands to depose Bernard from power.

In 832, Pepin rebelled again, escaping from his father's prison in Trier and fleeing to Aquitaine. Bernard of Septimania seems to have encouraged this revolt, in a change of loyalties, and his brother Louis the German soon followed. Louis the Pious was in Aquitaine to subdue any revolt, but was drawn off by the Bavarian insurrection of the younger Louis. Pepin took Limoges and other Imperial territories. The next year, Lothair joined the rebellion and, with the assistance of Ebbo, archbishop of Reims, the rebel sons deposed their father in 833. Lothair's later behaviour alienated Pepin, and the latter was at his father's side when Louis the Pious was reinstated on 1 March 834. Pepin was restored to his former status.

== Death ==
Pepin died scarcely four years after the 834 settlement; he was buried in the Church of St. Radegonde in Poitiers.

== Marriage and issue ==
In 822, Pepin had married Ingeltrude, daughter of Theodobert, count of Madrie, with whom he had two sons: Pepin II (823–after 864), and Charles (825–830 - 4 June 863), who became Archbishop of Mainz.

Both were minors when Pepin died, so Louis the Pious awarded Aquitaine to his own youngest son, Pepin's half-brother Charles the Bald. The Aquitainians, however, elected Pepin's son as Pepin II. His brother Charles also briefly claimed the kingdom. Both died childless. Pepin also had two daughters, one of whom married Gerard, Count of Auvergne.

== Sources ==
- Collins, Roger. "Pippin I and the Kingdom of Aquitaine." Charlemagne's Heir: New Perspectives on the Reign of Louis the Pious, edd. P. Godman and Roger Collins. Oxford: Oxford University Press, 1990. Reprinted in Law, Culture and Regionalism in Early Medieval Spain. Variorum, 1992. ISBN 0-86078-308-1.
- Riche, Pierre (1993). The Carolingians: A Family who Forged Europe. Translated by Allen, Michael Idomir. University of Pennsylvania Press.

Pepin I of Aquitaine Carolingian dynasty Born: 797 Died: 838
Preceded by Louis the Pious	King of Aquitaine; 817–838	Succeeded by Charles the Bald; Pepin II as rival kings
Preceded by Lothair I	Duke of Maine; 831–838	Succeeded by Charles the Bald
