= Isembard (vassal of Charlemagne) =

Isembard (also spelled Isembart or Isembert) was a vassal (vassus) of Charlemagne. According to the Vita Hludovici, in 805 he took part in Louis the Pious's campaign against the Emirate of Córdoba. He, along with Adhemar, Bera and Burrellus, was one of the leaders of the raiding party that crossed the Ebro river, sacked the Muslim base at Villa Rubea and defeated an army in pitched battle. After twenty days' raiding, they rejoined the main army besieging Tortosa. Isembard may have been leading his own men on this campaign.
