= Ermoldus Nigellus =

Ermoldus Nigellus, or Niger—translated Ermold the Black, or Ermoald (fl. 824–830), was a poet who lived at the court of Pippin of Aquitaine, son of Frankish Emperor Louis I, and accompanied him on a campaign into Brittany in 824. Ermoldus was a cultured man with a knowledge of the Latin poets, and his poem, In honorem Hludovici imperatoris ("In honour of Emperor Louis"), has some historical value. It consists of four books and deals with the life and exploits of Louis from 781 to 826. He also wrote two poems in imitation of Ovid, which were addressed to Pippin.

== Biography ==
Very little is known about Nigellus' life aside from what he writes about himself in his poetry. Although many scholars have thought that he was a monk or member of the Christian clergy, since we only have his own works as evidence about him, this affiliation as a monk cannot be proven. More recent scholarship on Nigellus, therefore, leans away from asserting his vocation as a monk.

The only other known fact about Nigellus is that some time in the 820s he was sent into exile for an undisclosed offence against Pippin and Louis. His poetic works were meant to appease Louis and Pippin for his crimes against them but were also meant to be used as proof that he was ready to be reinstated at court in Aquitaine.

== Career and identity ==
Although we do not know where Nigellus was from, the name Ermoldus is Germanic and his moniker, Nigellus (which means "Little black" in Latin), suggests that he was either "short in stature, dark haired or with a dark complexion".

Many scholars assume that because Nigellus was so passionate about being recalled from exile to return specifically to Aquitaine, that he was in fact Aquitainian but this is speculation. In fact, in his poem to Emperor Louis the Pious he actually avoids describing much of Aquitaine saying that readers should "go to Aquitaine" and see it for themselves. This has led some to suggest that he wasn't actually from Aquitaine but was simply interested in returning to courtly life at King Pippin's side. In this same poem Nigellus notes that he was an "integral part" of King Pippin's court and also says that King Pippin appreciated Nigellus' company as well as his poetics. From this it seems likely that in reality Nigellus' main desire when writing to King Louis was more about returning to the excitement and importance of court life more than returning to his homeland of Aquitaine.

Many earlier scholars believed Nigellus was a monk because he was able to read and write, but once again this is just an educated assumption. Another explanation for his ability to "compos[e] complicated poetry" could be because of the schools that Charlemagne had set up for children of nobility, therefore he may have simply been a member of the educated nobility. McKitterick explains that it is a mistake to assume that "education and learning were confined to clerics" as it was common for laymen and middle-class boys were also sent to schools. Fleiner explains that Nigellus could have been misidentified with many other figures from the same time period, especially an abbot named Hermoldus who Louis went to Pippin's court in 834, as well as a chancellor at Pippin's court named Hermoldus. Ermoldus Nigellus' association with these two contemporaries has led the false interpretation that he was a clergyman as well as Pippin's chancellor. For all we know he may very well have actually been the same person as these other two Hermolduses, but other evidence in his poetry suggests otherwise.

Another fact about himself that Nigellus discloses in his poetry was that he was a soldier in King Pippin's army during his second Brittany campaign. Although he was a soldier, Ermoldus admits he wasn't a very good one, and he quotes King Pippin as telling him to stick to writing rather than pursuing his swordplay, which was useless against the Bretons. This fact is problematic for scholars who believe that Ermoldus was a monk as monks did not typically bear arms or fight. He could have been an abbot as they were expected to do military service but it seems more likely that he was part of the "court literati" (educated men who served in court as military leaders, envoys and teachers).

== Exile ==
Since we know Ermoldus Nigellus campaigned in Brittany in 824 and wrote In Honorem Hludowici between 826 and 828 during his exile, it is often assumed that he was sent into exile between these years. Nigellus never explains the reason for his exile but admits that he committed "foul deeds of [his] own fault". Ermoldus admits that his crime was not serious but rather he was guilty of associating himself with the wrong group of people at court, perhaps people associated with Emperor Louis' rebellious sons. After he committed said foul deeds towards Louis, he was sent to exile at the church of St. Mary in Strasbourg. Being exiled at a church was commonly a punishment doled out to "criminal clerics" which is another reason many scholars are led to believe his status as a monk or priest. Nigellus describes his time in Strasbourg as an unhappy one, but it seems that his exile was actually rather pleasant and as some evidence shows Nigellus may not have even been under house arrest but actually under protective custody. Fleiner believes that Nigellus was placed under protective custody because he was placed in territory belonging to Emperor Louis' wife Judith who Nigellus admired very much. If the associates who had gotten Ermoldus exiled were planning treason against the royal family, then the emperor may well have been simply removing Ermoldus from the situation. On the other hand, Boutelle believes that Ermoldus may have been exiled for letting his men plunder a church during Pippin's Brittany campaign against Louis' orders as quoted in In Honorem Hludowici: "Save the churches, men, and do not touch the sacred buildings". Overall the reason for his exile remains an unresolved mystery to scholars since we do not have any other primary sources that refer to Ermoldus Nigellus except what is written in his own works.

== Return to court ==
The ending of Ermoldus' story is ultimately unknown, he could have been reinstated at court but we have little evidence to conclude that. The only suggestion of Ermoldus' return to court is the possibility that he could have been one of Pippin's chancellors (Hermoldus) as documented in three of Pippin's charters issued in the mid-830s. He produced no other surviving works and there are no references of him in any other literature of the time period.

== Poetry ==
=== Epistolae ===
After Ermoldus Nigellus was exiled by Emperor Louis, he wrote two poems for King Pippin whose court he had been living at and whom he had fought for in Brittany in 824. It is still unclear when Nigellus' epistles, or letters, to King Pippin were written, but Peter Godman argues that the first letter (Ad Pippinum regem) was written before In honorem Hludowici, and the second letter (Ad eundem Pippinum) was written afterwards in an attempt by Nigellus to form a "series of complementary appeals to the patronage of the emperor and his son". He wrote these letters in a style that imitates Ovid and therefore attempts to reproduce the "literary atmosphere of early Carolingian courts" that was associated with "patronage and favour". This approach would have helped to dignify his plea for recall at court.

=== In honorem Hludowici ===
Nigellus' most famous work, Carmina in honorem Hludowici Caesaris, was written some time between 826 and February of 828 while Nigellus was in exile at Strasbourg. It is about 2650 lines of verse and has been divided into four books. Its primary purposes were to praise the successful exploits of Emperor Louis and also to persuade Louis to allow Nigellus to return to King Pippin's court. Ermoldus also explains that In honorem Hludowici should be used by King Pippin as a guide on how to rule a kingdom as Nigellus describes Emperor Louis as the perfect role model for kingship. This poem is often called into question for its historical reliability as it is intended to win Emperor Louis' favour, not report history. In honorem Hludowici is blatantly panegyric and is completely narrative.

=== Other works ===
Scholars assume that these three pieces of literature were not the only pieces that Ermoldus wrote as he does mention in his works that he often amused King Pippin with his poetry during the Breton campaign in 824 and he also seems to be a very skilled writer. Unfortunately, none of these works survive today. Some scholars have argued Nigellus' authorship of a poem about Walter of Aquitaine, Waltharius, as there are similarities between it and In honorem Hludowici. But other scholars like Godman remain firm in their belief that Ermoldus did not write Waltharius as its poetic style is poorer than Ermoldus' is in his odes to Pippin and Louis.

== Notes ==
His Carmina in honorem Hludovici, edited by Ernst Dümmler, and other writings are published in the Monumenta Germaniae Historica. Scriptores, vol. 2 (Hanover, 1826 fol.); by J. P. Migne in the Patrologia Latina, vol. 105 (Paris, 1844); and by Dümmler in the Poetae Latini aevi Carolini, vol. 2 (Berlin, 1881–1884).

== Authorities ==
- W. O. Henkel, Über den historischen Werth der Gedichte des Ermoldus Nigellus (Eilenburg, 1876)
- Wilhelm Wattenbach, Deutschlands Geschichtsquellen, Band I (Berlin, 1904)
- August Potthast, Bibliotheca historica, pp. 430–431 (Berlin, 1896)
