= Council of Tribur =

The first Christian Council of Tribur was held in Tribur (now Trebur, Germany) in May 895, and was presided over by Archbishop Hatto of Mainz. This was a provincial council, as opposed to an ecumenical council.

The council made a number of declarations, the most important of which was the non-inheritance of church property by the relatives of clerics and penitential redemption.

It also mentioned that it considered triple immersion in Baptism as an imitation of the three days of Jesus in the tomb, and the rising from the water as an imitation of the Resurrection of Jesus.
