= Louis the German =

King of East Francia from 843 to 876

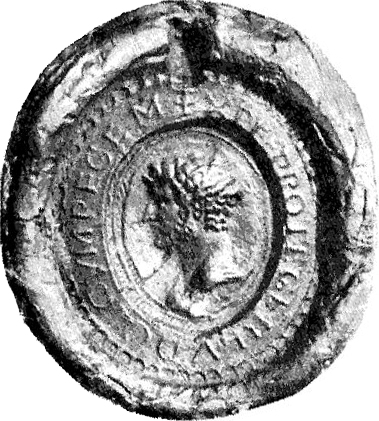
- Louis's seal with an effigy of the Roman emperor Hadrian. The inscription reads "XPE PROTEGE HLUDOICUM REGEM" meaning – "O Christ, protect King Louis!"

King of East Francia (King of Germany)
- Reign: c. 10 August 843 – 28 August 876
- Predecessor: Louis the Pious
- Successor: Carloman of Bavaria (Bavaria); Louis the Younger (Saxony); Charles the Fat (Alamannia)

King of West Francia (in opposition to Charles the Bald)
- Reign: 858 – 859 (a few months)
- Predecessor: Charles the Bald
- Successor: Charles the Bald
- Born: c. 806
- Died: 28 August 876 (aged c. 69/70); Frankfurt am Main, East Francia
- Burial: Lorsch Abbey
- Spouse: Emma of Altdorf (m. 827; d. 876)
- Issue: Carloman of Bavaria; Louis the Younger; Charles the Fat
- Dynasty: Carolingian
- Father: Louis the Pious
- Mother: Ermengarde of Hesbaye
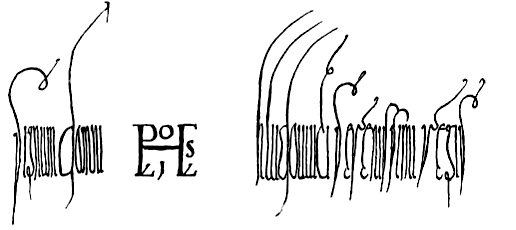
- Signum manus

The East Frankish Kingdom

Louis the German (Note: Sometimes anglicized Lewis, in German Ludwig. The Frankish pronunciation was like Hlu-do-vig. The name literally means "famous battle". A contemporary source, Ermoldus Nigellus, gives its two components as Hluto, praeclarum, and Wigch, Mars.) (German: Ludwig der Deutsche; c. 806/810 – 28 August 876), also known as Louis II of Germany (German: Ludwig II. von Deutschland), (Note: Numbered after Louis the Pious. He should not be confused with Louis II the Stammerer, king of France, nor Louis II the Younger, king of Italy, both grandsons of the same Louis I.) was the first king of East Francia, and ruled from 843 to 876 AD. Grandson of emperor Charlemagne and the third son of Louis the Pious, emperor of Francia, and his first wife, Ermengarde of Hesbaye, he received the appellation Germanicus shortly after his death, when East Francia became known as the kingdom of Germany. He was also briefly king of West Francia from 858 to 859 for a few months in opposition to his brother Charles the Bald.

After protracted clashes with his father and his brothers, Louis received the East Frankish kingdom in the Treaty of Verdun (843). His attempts to conquer his half-brother Charles the Bald's West Frankish kingdom in 858–59 were unsuccessful. The 860s were marked by a severe crisis, with the East Frankish rebellions of the sons, as well as struggles to maintain supremacy over his realm. In the Treaty of Meerssen he acquired Lotharingia for the East Frankish kingdom in 870. On the other hand, he tried and failed to claim both the title of Emperor and Italy. In the East, Louis was able to reach a longer-term peace agreement in 874 after decades of conflict with the Moravians. His rule shows a marked decline in creation of written administration and government documents, a trend that would continue into Ottonian times.

== Early life ==
His early years were spent at the courts of his grandfather and father. In 814, when his older brothers Lothair and Pepin were designated to govern Bavaria and Aquitaine, Louis was still very young. In 817, his father, emperor Louis the Pious issued Ordinatio Imperii, and assigned titles and regions to his sons, making Lothair co-emperor, Pepin king in Aquitaine, and Louis king in Bavaria, with additional jurisdiction over Carantania, Bohemia and other dependent Slavs and Avars. Such political solutions were following the practice of emperor Charlemagne of bestowing regional realms to a close family members who would serve as his lieutenants and local governors.

Louis ruled over Bavaria and its dependencies from Regensburg, the old capital of the Bavarians. Since he was young, during the first several years Louis ruled in assistance with able royal administrators. In 825, he became involved in wars with the Sorbs and other Polabian Slavs (known to Franks as Wends) on north-eastern frontiers. In 827, he married Hemma, sister of his stepmother Judith of Bavaria, both daughters of count Welf, whose possessions ranged from Alsace to Bavaria. In the same year (827), Bulgarians invaded Pannonia, thus initiating the start of a Frankish–Bulgarian conflict in the region.

In 828, the vast Duchy of Friuli was divided into four counties, with Friuli proper and Istria remaining under jurisdiction of Lothair's Italian realm, while Carniola and Lower Pannonia were added to the jurisdiction of Louis' Bavarian realm. At the same time, the question of effective rule over Carantania was also resolved in Louis' favor. Thus, the young king of Bavaria became ruler of entire Frankish southeast, which included Bavaria and Carantania with all eastern marches and dependent Avar and Slavic regions throughout Pannonia.

In 828 and 829, Louis undertook two campaigns against the Bulgarians who were invading Pannonia, and secured victory by repelling the invaders. During his time as Unterkönig (sub-king), he tried to extend his rule to the Rhine-Main area.

== Rebellious son ==
In 829, the emperor Louis decided to grant Alamannia to his youngest son Charles, thus changing provisions of the 817 succession settlements. A series of dynastic conflicts and wars followed between the emperor and his older sons. Louis of Bavaria became involved reluctantly in the first dynastic conflict that erupted in 830 between his eldest brother Lothair and their father (830), thus allowing him to reconcile with the emperor. In 831, a new succession settlement was imposed by an imperial decree, designating Louis of Bavaria as future inheritor of Thuringia, Saxony, Austrasia, Frisia, and northern portions of Neustria.

As early as 832, dynastic conflicts were renewed. Louis invaded Alamannia, which his father had previously given to young Charles, but was driven back by the emperor. Louis the Pious disinherited him, but to no effect, since the conflict escalated during 833 into open war between emperor Louis and all of his older sons. The emperor was soon captured and deposed by Lothair, who tried to impose firm authority over his brothers, and thus already in 834 an open war between brothers broke out. Lothair was forced to retreat and Louis the Pious was reinstated as emperor. Louis of Bavaria made peace with his father and kept Bavaria with extended jurisdiction over several other East Frankish regions.

Louis instigated another dynastic conflict, which was initiated in 838 by the death of Pepin of Aquitaine and escalated in 839 when emperor Louis imposed new succession settlements favoring Lothair and Charls, while reducing the inheritance of Louis of Bavaria to his Bavarian and adjacent south-eastern regions. A war broke out and Louis of Bavaria again invaded Alamannia and other eastern regions, achieving some initial success. This time, emperor Louis responded quickly, and soon the younger Louis was forced to retreat into Bavaria. Prominent nobles tried to reconcile father and son, but the old emperor remained reluctant and bitter until his death in 840.

== Dynastic war and aftermath, 840–843 ==
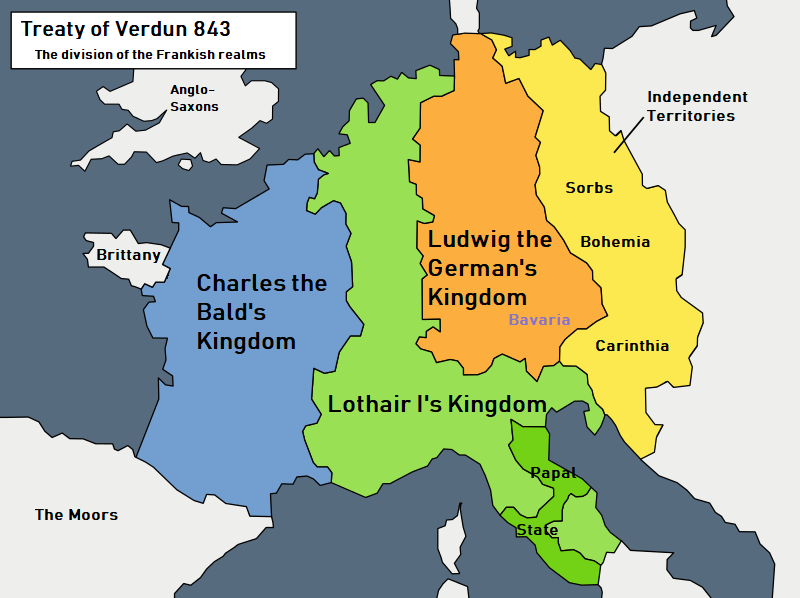
Lands divided by the Treaty of Verdun

When the emperor Louis died in 840 and Lothair I claimed the whole Empire, Louis allied with Charles the Bald. He defeated Lothair I's commander, Adalbert of Metz, at the battle of the Ries on 13 May 841. A few weeks later, Louis and Charles defeated Lothair and their nephew Pepin II of Aquitaine at the Battle of Fontenoy on 25 June. Both sides suffered heavy casualties. According to the Annals of Fulda, it was the biggest bloodbath the Franks had experienced from time immemorial. At the same time, it was Louis's last battle in the struggle for the unification of the kingdom.

In June 842, the three brothers met on an island in the river Saône to negotiate a peace and each appointed forty representatives to arrange the boundaries of their respective kingdoms. This developed into the Treaty of Verdun, concluded by 10 August 843, under which Louis received the bulk of the lands lying east of the Rhine (East Francia), together with a district around Speyer, Worms, and Mainz on the left bank of the river (see also Oaths of Strasbourg 842). His territories included Bavaria (where he made Regensburg the seat of his government), Thuringia, Franconia, and Saxony.

Louis may be called the founder of the German kingdom, though his attempts to maintain the unity of the Empire proved futile. Having crushed the Stellinga rising in Saxony in 842, he compelled the Obotrites to accept his authority in 844 and put their prince, Gozzmovil, to death. Thachulf, Duke of Thuringia, then undertook campaigns against the Bohemians, Moravians, and other tribes, but was not very successful in resisting the ravaging Vikings.

== Conflicts with Charles the Bald ==
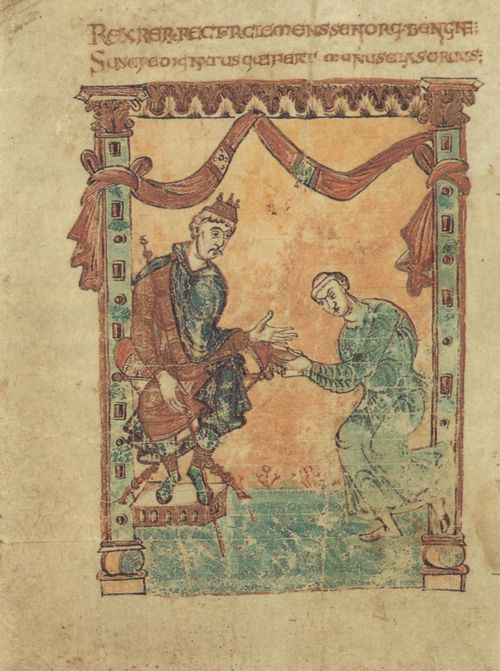
Wandalbert of Prüm presents his martyrology to a king, probably Louis the German, in a 9th-century illustration

Starting from 852 to 853, Louis made repeated attempts to extend his rule into West Francia. According to the Annals of Fulda (Annales Fuldenses), the legates from Aquitaine offered him the throne, expressing their grievances over the misrule of Charles the Bald, but the attempted takeover of Aquitaine by Louis' son Louis the Younger failed in 854-855.

Encouraged by his nephews Peppin II and Charles of Provence, Louis invaded West Francia in 858. Charles the Bald could not even raise an army to resist the invasion and fled to Burgundy. Later that year, Louis issued a charter dated "the first year of the reign in West Francia." However, treachery and desertion in his army, and the continued loyalty of the Aquitanian bishops to Charles the Bald, brought about the failure of the whole enterprise. As such, both Louis and Charles made public vows to uphold the peace on 7 June 860 at Koblenz.

After the emperor Lothair I died in 855, Louis and Charles for a time cooperated in plans to divide Lothair's possessions between themselves, the only impediments to this being Lothair's sons and heirs—Lothair II (who received Lotharingia), Louis II of Italy (who held the imperial title and the Iron Crown of Lombardy) and Charles of Provence. In 868 at Metz, Louis and Charles agreed to partition Lotharingia. When Lothair II died in 869, Louis was lying seriously ill and his armies were engaged in a war with the Moravians. Charles the Bald quickly seized Lothair's lands, but Louis, having recovered, compelled him by threat of war to agree to the Treaty of Meerssen, which divided Lothair's lands among all the claimants.

On the eastern frontiers, he appointed his eldest son Carloman of Bavaria to lead a military expedition against the Great Moravia in 858, while the second son Louis the Younger and Thachulf, Duke of Thuringia were in the same time tasked to advance against Polabian Slavic tribes of Abodrites, Linones and Sorbs.

== Divisio regni among the sons ==
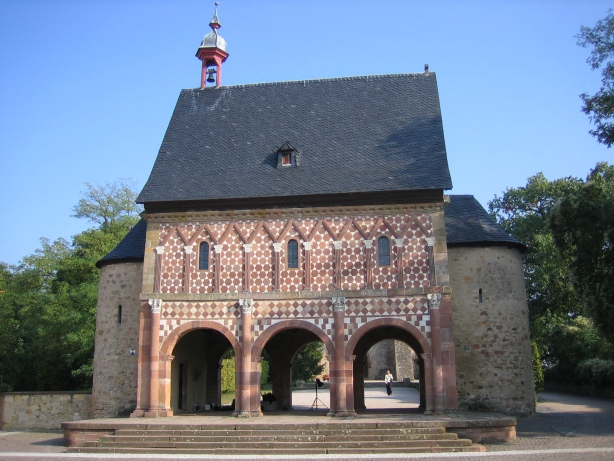
Carolingian gatehouse (Torhalle) to Lorsch Abbey, where Louis the German was buried

The later years of Louis the German were troubled by rebellions of his sons. The eldest, Carloman of Bavaria, revolted in 861 and again two years later. This was followed by the second son Louis the Younger, who was joined by his brother Charles the Fat. In 864 Louis was forced to grant Carloman the kingdom of Bavaria, which he himself had once held under his father. In 865 he divided the remainder of his lands—Saxony with Franconia and Thuringia went to Louis the Younger and Swabia with Raetia to Charles the Fat.

In May 868, Louis convoked a synod at Worms to deal with the aftermath of the Photian schism and to get the church's support against Moravia.

A report that the Emperor Louis II had died in Italy led to a peace between father and sons and attempts by Louis the German to gain the imperial crown for his oldest son Carloman. These efforts were thwarted by Louis II, who was in fact not dead, and Louis' old adversary, Charles the Bald.

== Later life ==
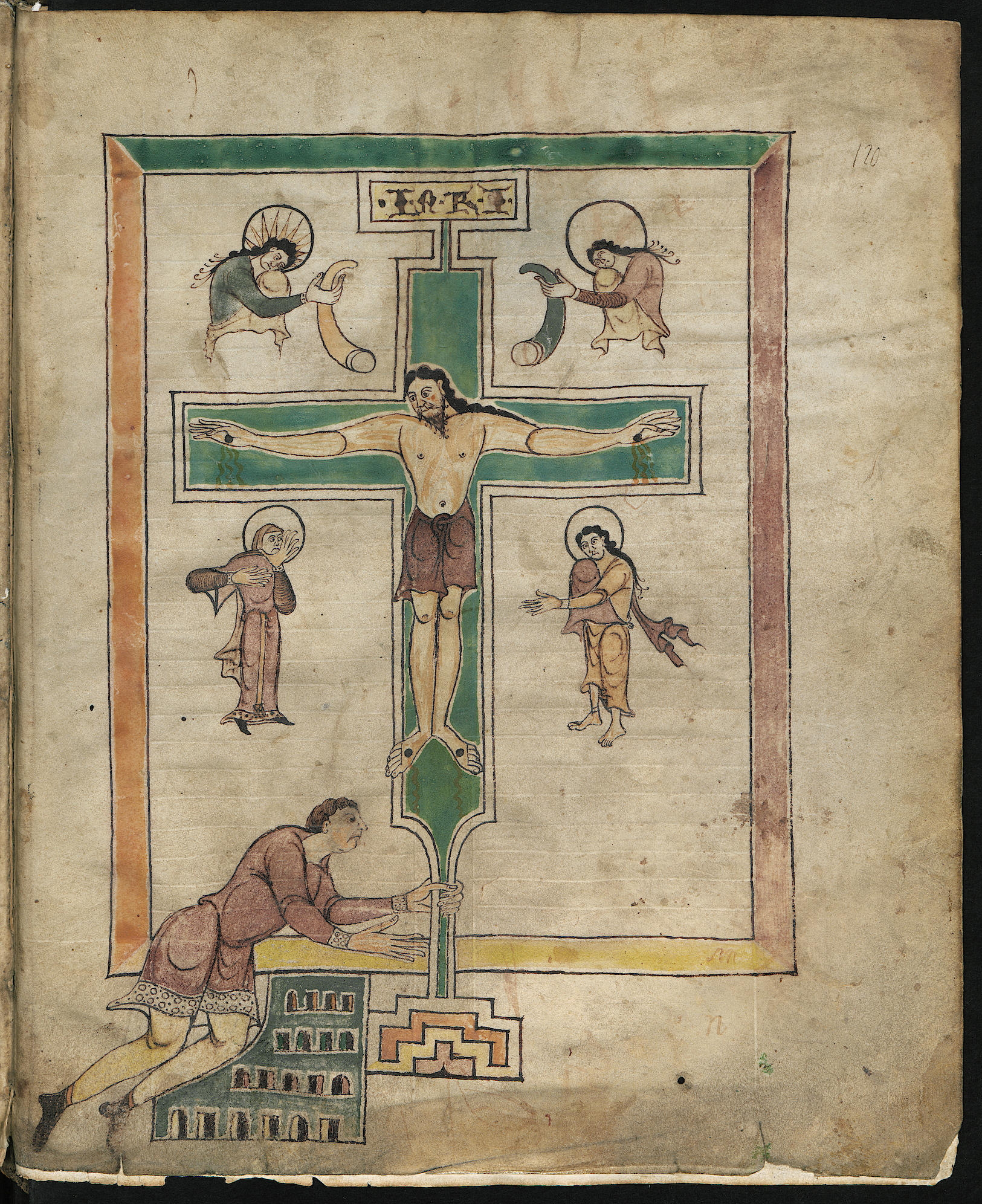
Contemporary illustration from the Louis the German Psalter depicting Louis (bottom) genuflecting before Christ on the cross

In the years 872 and 873, ambassadors from the Eastern Roman Emperor Basil I came to Louis in Regensburg, showing that his rule was perceived as far as Constantinople. After the death of Emperor Louis II in August 875, Louis tried to win the emperorship for himself and his descendants. To this end, Abbot Sigihard von Fulda undertook a trip to Rome to Pope John VIII. On 18 May 876, he returned to Ingelheim and reported to Louis that, in December 875, Charles the Bald had been able to obtain the title of emperor by a swift move to Rome.

His wife Hemma visited Louis for the last time in May 875. In 874 she had lost her voice as a result of a stroke. During his stay, he donated the Berg im Donaugau Abbey to the Marienkapelle, which he built. Hemma died at the end of January 876 in Regensburg. Louis then died from a stroke on 28 August 876 at his palace in Frankfurt. The following day he was buried by his son Louis in Lorsch Abbey. According to Wilfried Hartmann, it cannot be determined with certainty whether the dead man in his sarcophagus is the Carolingian king. After Louis' death, Charles the Bald tried to win over the eastern kingdom as well. However, Louis the Younger defeated him on 8 October 876 at Andernach with a force of Franks, Saxons and Thuringians. One year later, Charles the Bald died as well.

== Louis' residence ==
As there exist only 172 royal documents from 59 years of his reign as first the King of Bavaria and later the King of East Francia, it is impossible to construct a detailed picture of Louis' whereabouts in the East Frankish kingdom. By comparison, Louis the Pious had 18 certificates created per year, and his half-brother Charles the Bald had 12 produced annually. This pattern of not producing many documents lasts for several months at certain times. For example, it is completely uncertain where the East Frankish king stayed between June 849 and July 850. At least 52 documents are addressed to Bavarian beneficiaries. However, the intensity of the documentary production for Bavarian recipients steadily decreased during his reign.

As a stem duchy, the Rhine-Main area contained Frankfurt, Mainz and Worms, and had plenty of imperial palaces and treasuries. Since it was located in the geographic centre of the East Frankish kingdom, it was easily accessible by road. As a result, it was the region that hosted most East Frankish synods and imperial assemblies.

== Nickname "the German" ==
Louis was only nicknamed "the German" in the 18th century. Contemporary West Frankish sources called Louis rex Germaniae ("King of Germania") or rex Germanorum ("King of the Teutons"). However, in this context, Germania or Germani does not mean "Germany" or "the Germans", but, as in ancient Latin, the area on the right bank of the Rhine outside the former Roman Empire and its inhabitants. Contemporaries gave Louis the epithet pius (pious) or piissimus (very pious). The contemporary coinage called him HLUDOVICUS PIUS REX.

== Marriage and children ==
Louis was married to Hemma (died 31 January 876), and they had:

- Hildegard (828–856), abbess of Fraumunster
- Carloman of Bavaria (829–880), King of Bavaria
- Irmgard of Chiemsee also known as Ermengard (died 866) (Louis, having established two of his other daughters as abbesses of convents, appointed Irmgard (also known as Ermengard) to govern first the monastery of Buchau and then the royal abbey of Chiemsee in Bavaria. She is commemorated as a saint on 17 July.)
- Gisela, possibly died in childhood
- Louis the Younger (835–882)
- Bertha (died 877)
- Charles the Fat (839–888)

== See also ==
- East Francia
- Medieval Germany
- Medieval Austria
- Medieval Switzerland
- Polabian Slavs
- Pannonian Slavs

== Bibliography ==
- Altmann, Wilhelm; Bernheim, Ernst (1891). Ausgewählte Urkunden zur Erläuterung der Verfassungsgeschichte Deutschlands im Mittelalter. Berlin: Gaertners Verlagsbuchhandlung.
- Bowlus, Charles R. (1995). Franks, Moravians, and Magyars: The Struggle for the Middle Danube, 788-907. Philadelphia: University of Pennsylvania Press.
- Costambeys, Marios; Innes, Matthew; MacLean, Simon (2011). The Carolingian World. Cambridge University Press.
- Dutton, Paul Edward (1990). "Beyond the Topos of Senescense: The Political Problems of Aged Carolingian Rulers". In Sheehan, Michael M. (ed.). Aging and the Aged in Medieval Europe. Pontifical Institute of Medieval Studies.
- Geary, Patrick J. (2006). Women at the Beginning: Origin Myths from the Amazons to the Virgin Mary. Princeton University Press.
- Goldberg, Eric J. (2006). Struggle for Empire: Kingship and Conflict under Louis the German, 817-876. Ithaca, NY: Cornell University Press.
- Gwatkin, Henry Melvill; Whitney, James Pounder; Tanner, Joseph Robson; Previté-Orton, Charles William; Brooke, Zachary Nugent, eds. (1957). The Cambridge Medieval History. Vol. 3. Macmillan.
- Hartmann, Wilfried (2002). Ludwig der Deutsche.
- McKitterick, Rosamond (1983). The Frankish Kingdoms Under the Carolingians, 751-987. Harlow: Longman.
- Reuter, Timothy, ed. (1992). The Annals of Fulda. Manchester: Manchester University Press.
- Reuter, Timothy (2013) [1991]. Germany in the Early Middle Ages c. 800–1056. London and New York: Routledge.
- Riché, Pierre (1993). The Carolingians: A Family Who Forged Europe. Philadelphia: University of Pennsylvania Press.
- Schmitt, Miriam (1996). "St. Irmengard: No Poor on the Isle of Chiemsee". In Kulzer, Linda; Schmitt, Miriam (eds.). Medieval Women Monastics: Wisdom's Wellsprings. Liturgical Press. pp. 117–136.
- Scholz, Bernhard W.; Rogers, Barbara, eds. (1970). Carolingian Chronicles: Royal Frankish Annals and Nithard's Histories. Ann Arbor: University of Michigan Press.
- Schutz, Herbert (2004). The Carolingians in Central Europe, Their History, Arts, and Architecture: A Cultural History of Central Europe, 750-900. Leiden-Boston: Brill.
- Walsh, Michael J. (2007). A New Dictionary of Saints: East and West. Liturgical Press.
- West, Charles (2023). The Fall of a Carolingian Kingdom: Lotharingia, 855–869. Toronto: University of Toronto Press.

Louis II of East Francia Carolingian dynasty Born: c. 806/810 Died: 28 August 876
Regnal titles
Preceded by Charles the Younger	Duke of Maine; 811–817	Succeeded by Lothair I
Preceded by Louis I the Pious as King of the Franks	King of Bavaria; 817–843	Succeeded by Carloman as King of Bavaria
Preceded by Louis I the Pious as King of the Franks	King of East Francia; 843–876	Succeeded by Carloman as King of Bavaria
Preceded by Louis I the Pious as King of the Franks	King of East Francia; 843–876	Succeeded by Louis III the Younger as King of Saxony
Preceded by Louis I the Pious as King of the Franks	King of East Francia; 843–876	Succeeded by Charles III the Fat as King of Swabia
