= Isambart =

Seventh century Frankish count

Isambart (died after 806), Count in Thurgau, also known as Isambard the Saxon, was an 8th-century count (comes) in the Frankish lands of Saxony and Master of the Palace at Altdorf in Alamannia.

== Life ==
He was born about 750 AD in Narbonne, France the son of Warin I, documented as count in Thurgau, and his wife Adalindis, a daughter of Duke Hildeprand of Spoleto and his wife Regarde.

Isanbart himself was first mentioned as a Thurgau count in 774 and made significant donations to the Abbey of Saint Gall. He was Greve, Comte, of Altorf and Master of the Palace.

His wife was Thiedrada (Thietrate), of Carolingian origin, and he was the father of

- Hedwig (Heilwig; d. after 833), married Count Welf;
- Adalung, abbot of Lorsch 804–837;
- Adalindis

With a second wife he had Hunfrid I of Istria, Guelph of Andechs and the Brother of Bouchard "the Constable", and Alberic I de Narbonne.

He died after 806 AD in Saxony.
