= Ermengarde of Hesbaye =

Carolingian Empress from 813 to 818

Empress consort of the Carolingian Empire
- Tenure: 813–818
- Coronation: 5 October 816 by Pope Stephen IV; Reims Cathedral

Queen consort of the Franks
- Tenure: 814–818
- Born: c. 778
- Died: 3 October 818 (aged ≈ 40); Angers, Neustria, Francia
- Spouse: Louis the Pious
- Issue: Lothair I; Pepin I of Aquitaine; Louis the German
- House: Counts of Hesbaye
- Father: Ingerman, Count of Hesbaye
- Mother: Rotrude

Ermengarde (or Irmingard) of Hesbaye (c. 778 – 3 October 818), probably a member of the Robertian dynasty, was Carolingian empress from 813 and Queen of the Franks from 814 until her death as the wife of the Carolingian emperor Louis the Pious.

== Life ==
Ermengarde was the daughter of Count Ingerman of Hesbaye and Rotrude.

About 794 Ermengarde married Louis the Pious, son of Charlemagne, who since 781 ruled as a King of Aquitaine. He had already fathered two children, and Ermengarde may have been his concubine. Ermengarde gave birth to six children:

- Lothair I (795–855), born in Altdorf, Bavaria
- Pepin I of Aquitaine (797–838)
- Berta, born c. 799
- Rotrude, born about 800
- Hildegard, born c. 802, abbess of Notre-Dame in Laon
- Louis the German (c. 805 – 876), King of East Francia

Charlemagne initially intended to divide his Carolingian Empire between Louis and his brothers Pepin and Charles, who nevertheless died in quick succession in 810/11. On 10 September 813, Charlemagne designated Louis his successor and had him proclaimed co-emperor. Ermengarde's husband became sole emperor and king of the Franks upon his father's death on 28 January 814. The couple was anointed and crowned emperor and empress by Pope Stephen IV on 5 October 816 in Reims Cathedral.

She died at Angers, Neustria (in present-day France) on 3 October 818. A few years after her death, her husband remarried to Judith of Bavaria, who bore him Charles the Bald.

== Sources ==
- McKitterick, Rosamond (2008). Charlemagne: The Formation of a European Identity. Cambridge University Press.
- Nelson, Janet L. (1995). "The Frankish Kingdoms 814-898: the West". In McKitterick, Rosamond (ed.). The New Cambridge Medieval History. Vol. II. Cambridge University Press.
- Wilson, Katharina M., ed. (1984). Medieval Women Writers. Manchester University Press.

Royal titles
New title	Carolingian empress 813–818	Succeeded by Judith of Bavaria
Preceded by Luitgard	Queen of the Franks; 814–818	Succeeded by Judith of Bavaria
