= History of Provence =

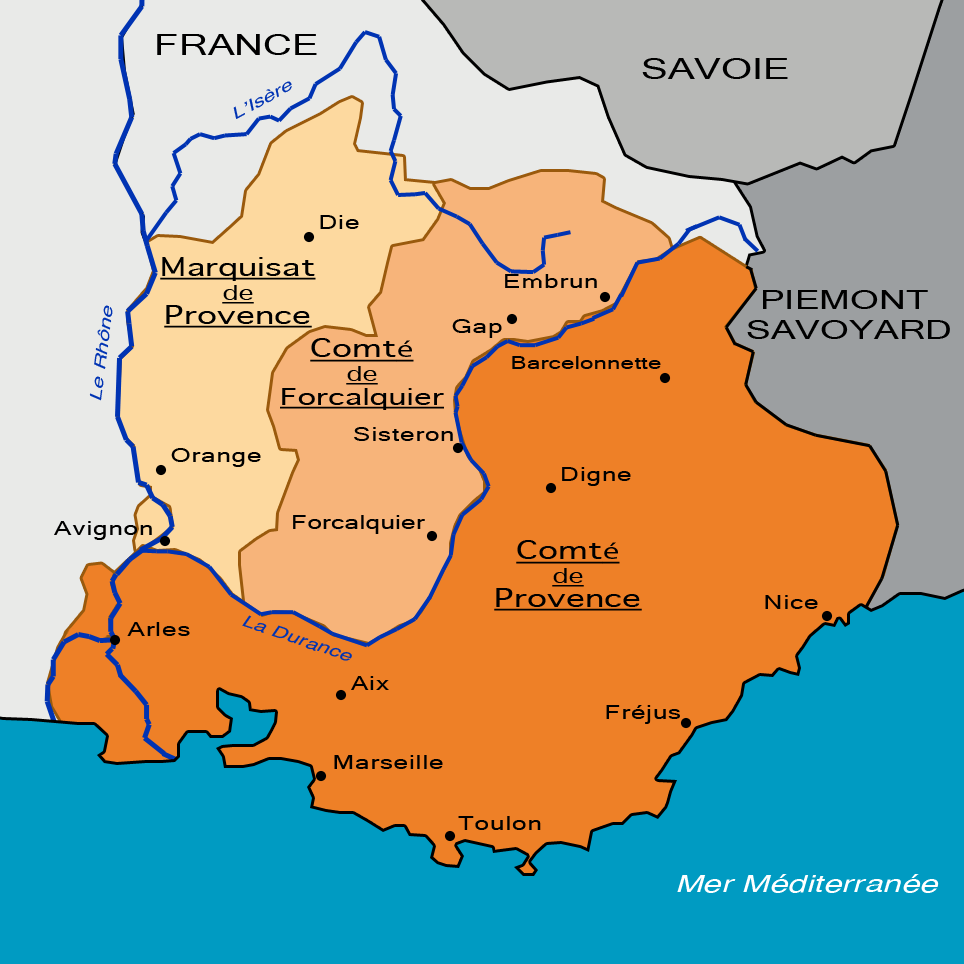
Provence in the 12th century: the County of Provence, the Marquisate of Provence, and the County of Forcalquier

History of Provence encompasses the entire history of Provence, stretching from the protohistoric times up to the contemporary period. As a historical region, Provence is located within borders of the modern administrative region of Provence-Alpes-Côte d'Azur in the southeast corner of France, between the Alps, the Mediterranean Sea, the river Rhône and the upper reaches of the river Durance. The region was inhabited since the prehistoric times. From about 900 BCE, it was settled by the Celts, and also by Greek colonists, from about 600 BCE. At the end of the 2nd century BCE, it was conquered by the Romans, who ruled the region until the 5th century CE. In the first half of the 6th century, it came under the Frankish rule, and was organized in time as the County of Provence. After the dissolution of the Carolingian Empire, it became part of the Kingdom of Lower Burgundy (since 879), the Welfish Kingdom of Burgundy (since 933), and the Kingdom of Burgundy (Arles) within the Holy Roman Empire from 1032 up to the 1486, when the County was united with the Kingdom of France. During those periods, it was ruled by the Counts of Provence from various feudal families. Provence has been a part of France for over 500 years, but the region kept a specific cultural identity that persists to this day, particularly in the interior.

== Etymology ==
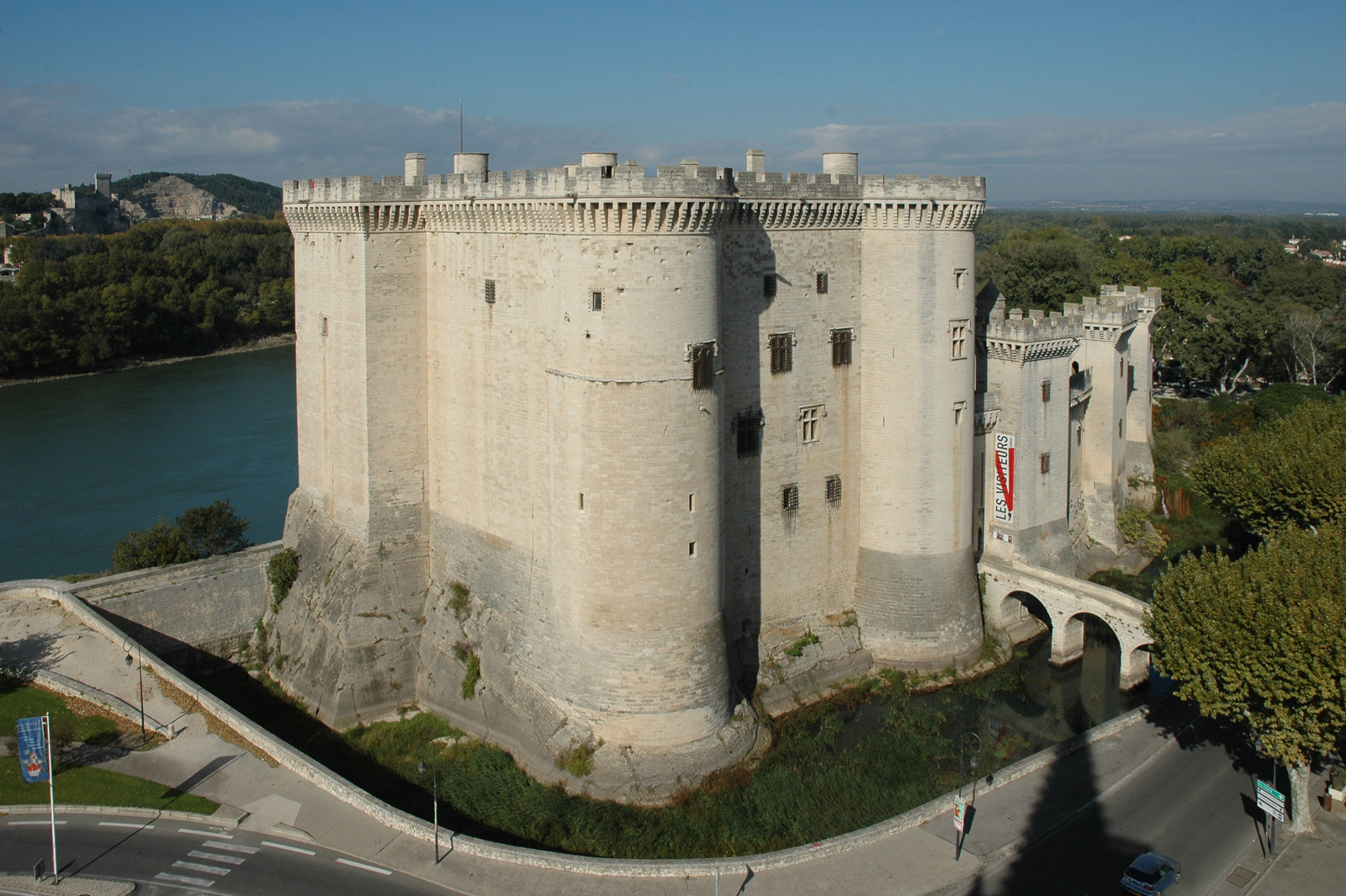
The Chateau of Good King René, the last ruler of Provence, in Tarascon (15th century)

The region got its name in Roman times, when it was known as Provincia Romana, simply "the Roman province". This eventually was shortened to Provincia (the province), and as the language evolved from Latin to Provençal, so did the pronunciation and spelling.

== Prehistoric Provence ==
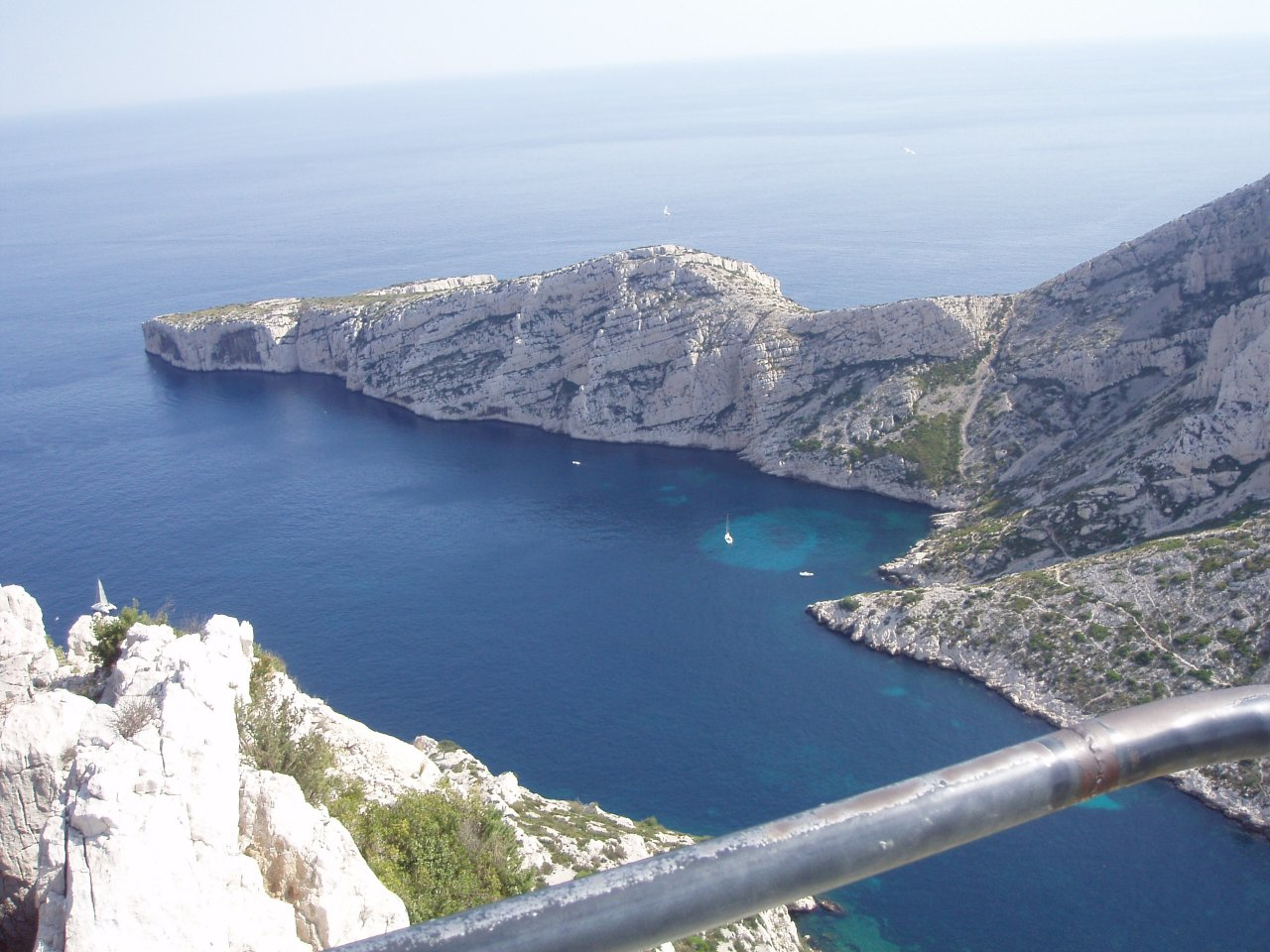
The entrance to the Cosquer Cave, decorated with paintings of penguins, bison, seals and outlines of hands dating to 27,000 to 19,000 BC, is 37 meters under the surface of the Calanque de Morgiou near Cassis.

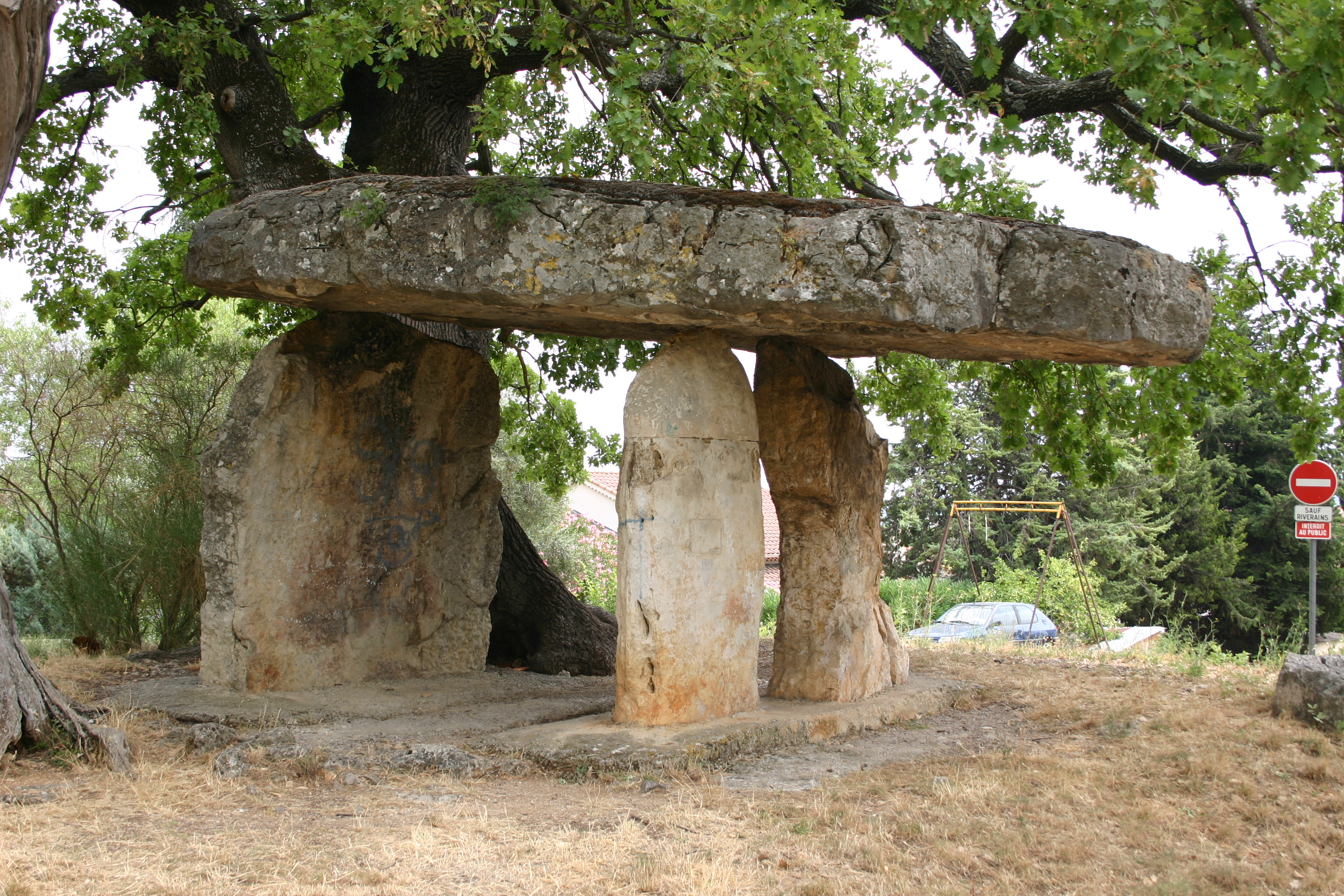
A bronze-age dolmen (2500 to 900 B.C.) near Draguignan

The coast of Provence has some of the earliest sites of human habitation known in Europe. Primitive stone tools have been found in the Grotte du Vallonnet near Roquebrune-Cap-Martin, between Monaco and Menton, dating to c. 1.2 Ma (million years ago). The excavations at Terra Amata in Nice found signs of an encampment on a prehistoric beach, with traces of some of the earliest fireplaces found in Europe, dating to about 400,000 years ago. Tools dating to the Middle Paleolithic (300,000 years ago) and Upper Paleolithic (30,000-10,000 years ago) were discovered in the Observatory Cave, in the Jardin Exotique de Monaco. Tools found in the Grotte du Lazaret near Nice date to between 130,000 and 170,000 years ago.

During the Paleolithic age the inhabitants of Provence lived in caves, or in huts made of branches or covered with animal skins. Evidence found at the Grotte du Vallonnet shows they were more scavengers than hunters, using tools to scrape meat from the carcasses of bison, deer, rhinoceros, horses and other game killed by saber-toothed tigers, tigers, panthers and other predators. They endured two ice ages, which caused dramatic changes in climate, vegetation and even sea level. At the beginning of the Paleolithic period, the sea level in western Provence was 150 meters higher than it is today. By the end of the Paleolithic, it had dropped 100 to 150 meters lower than today's sea level. The cave dwellings of the early inhabitants of Provence were inundated by the rising sea or left far from the sea and swept away by erosion.

In 1985, a diver named Henri Cosquer discovered the mouth of a submarine cave 37 meters below the surface of the Calanque de Morgiou near Marseille. Inside, the walls of the Cosquer Cave are decorated with drawings of bisons, seals, penguins, horses and outlines of human hands, dating to between 27,000 and 19,000 BC.

Beginning in about 8,500 BC, at the end of the Mesolithic period, the climate of Provence began to warm again. The sea rose gradually to its present level, and the forests began to retreat. The disappearance of the forests and of deer and other large game meant that the inhabitants of Provence had to survive on rabbits, snails and wild sheep.

From 6600-5600/5400 BC, the Castelnovian people, living around Châteauneuf-les-Martigues, were some of the last Mesolithic people in the region. They mostly hunted large mammals, like the ibex (Capra ibex) and chamois (Rupicarpa Rupicarpa), along with smaller prey such as marmots (Marmota marmota) and Leporidae. They were also known to fish and gather pond turtles.

There has been confusion between what is attributed to the Castelnovians and what is attributed to the later Neolithic Impressa. It is now the consensus that between 5900-5400 BC, pioneering agro-pastoralists arrived from the south of Italy (likely by sea), who were likely responsible for the evidence of sheep herding once attributed to Castelnovians. Pottery likely first came to Provence from the Impressa.

At about the same time, another wave of new settlers from the east, the Chasséens, arrived in Provence. They were farmers and warriors, and gradually displaced the pastoral people from their lands. They were followed in about 2500 BC by another wave of settlers, also farmers, known as the Courronniens, who arrived by sea and settled along the coast of what is now the French department of Bouches-du-Rhône.

== Ligures and Celts in Provence ==
The peoples of Provence before the Roman conquest

In the 4th century BC a people known by the Greeks and Romans as the Ligures inhabited Provence from the Alps to the Rhône. They were probably the descendants of the indigenous Neolithic peoples who had lived there through the Iron Age and the Bronze Age, but had not yet discovered iron. They did not have their own alphabet, but their language remains in place names in Provence ending in the suffixes -asc, -osc. -inc, -ates, and auni. The ancient geographer Posidonios wrote of them: "Their country is savage and dry. The soil is so rocky that you cannot plant anything without striking stones. The men compensate for the lack of wheat by hunting... They climb the mountains like goats." They were also warlike; they invaded Italy and went as far as Rome in the 4th century BC, and they later aided the passage of Hannibal on his way to attack Rome (218 BC).

Some time between the 8th and 5th centuries BC, tribes of Celts, probably coming from Central Europe, also began moving into Provence. They had weapons made of iron, which allowed them to defeat the Ligures, who were still armed with bronze weapons. One tribe, called the Segobriga, settled near modern-day Marseille. The Caturiges, Tricastins, and Cavares settled to the west of the Durance river.

The Ligures were more numerous than the Celtic peoples, and the Celto-Ligures eventually shared the territory of Provence, each tribe in its own alpine valley or settlement along a river, each with its own king and dynasty. They built hilltop forts and settlements, later given the Latin name oppida. Today the traces of 165 oppida have been found in the Var and as many as 285 in the Alpes-Maritimes. They worshiped aspects of nature, establishing sacred woods at Sainte-Baume and Gémenos, and healing springs at Glanum and Vernėègues. Later, in the 5th and 4th centuries BC, the tribes formed confederations; the Vocontii from the Isère to the Vaucluse; the Cavares in the Comtat; and the Salyens, from the Rhône to the Var.

The Celto-Ligures used the Rhône to trade iron, silver, alabaster, marble, gold, resin, wax, honey and cheese with other tribes in Gaul. Etruscan traders from Italy began to visit the coast. Etruscan amphorae from the 7th and 6th centuries BC have been found in Marseille, Cassis, and in hilltop oppida in the region.

Traces of the Celts and Ligures remain today in the ruins of their hilltop fortresses, in dolmens and other megaliths found in eastern Provence, in the stone shelters called 'Bories' found in the Luberon and Comtat, and in the rock carvings in the Valley of Marvels near Mont Bégo in the Alpes-Maritimes, at an altitude of 2,000 meters. The ruins of the Salyes oppidum of Glanum (found beneath the ruins of the later Roman town) show traces of the old ramparts from the 6th to 3rd centuries B.C., as well as vestiges of Celto-Ligurian temples and public buildings.

== The Greeks in Provence ==
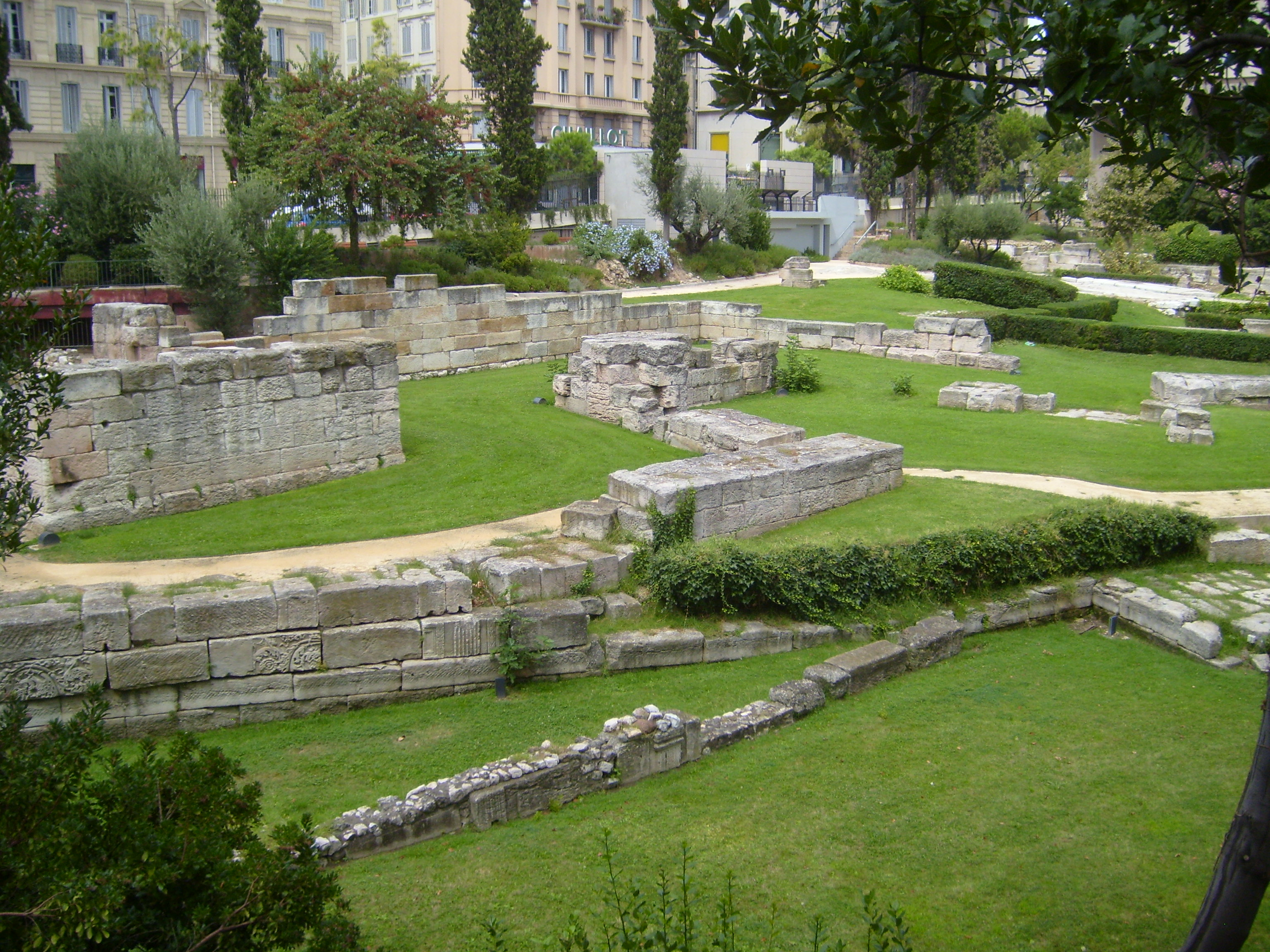
Remains of the ancient harbor of Massalia, near the Old Port of Marseille

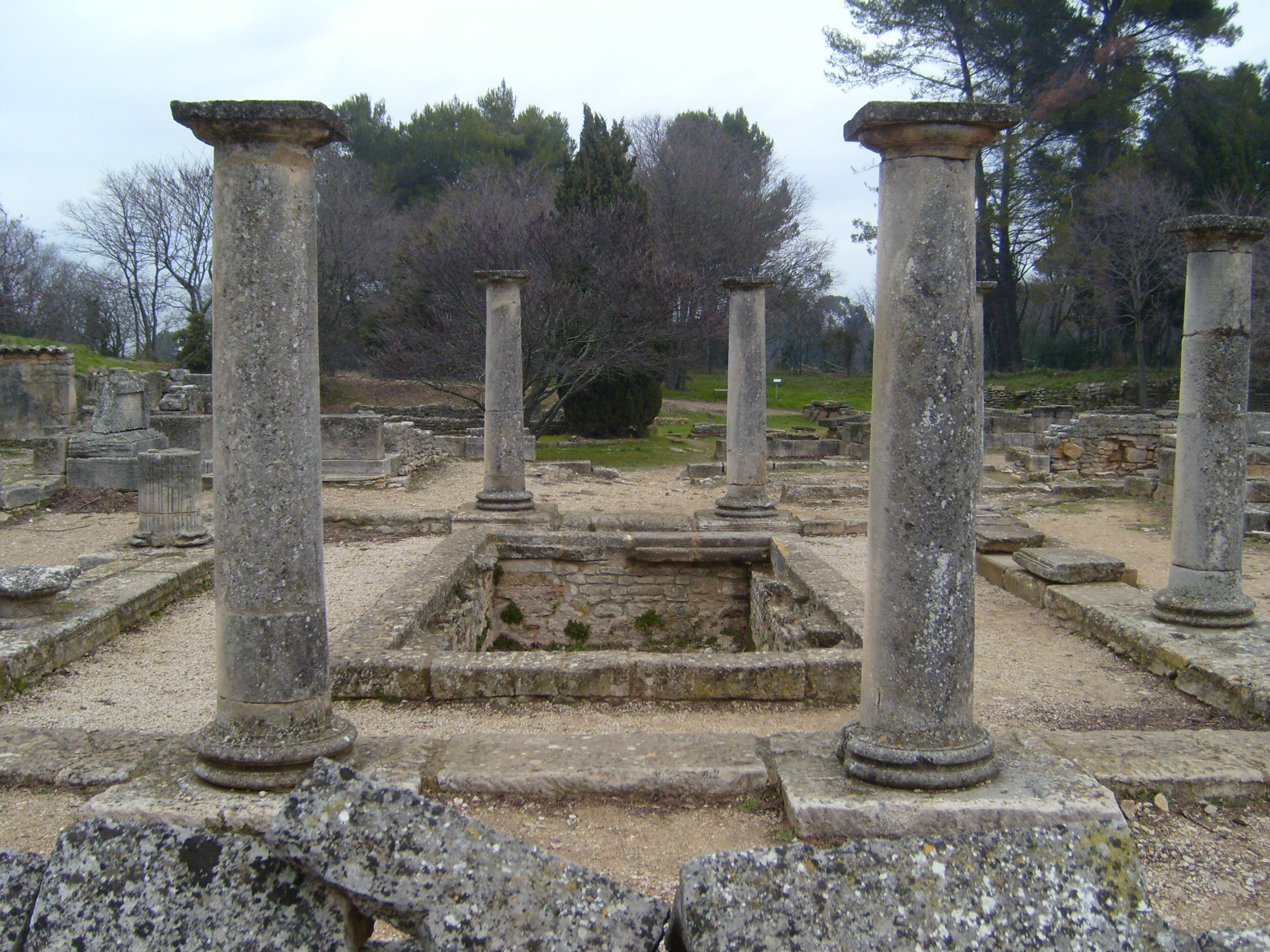
The House of Antes, a Hellenistic villa in Glanum (1st-2nd centuries B.C.)

Traders from the island of Rhodes were visiting the coast of Provence in the 7th century BC. Rhodes pottery from that century has been found in Marseille, near Martigues and Istres, and at mont Garou and Évenos near Toulon. The traders from Rhodes gave their names to the ancient town of Rhodanousia (now Trinquetaille, across the Rhône from Arles) and to the main river of Provence, the Rhodanos, today known as the Rhône.

The first permanent Greek settlement was Massalia, established at modern-day Marseille in about 600 BC by colonists coming from Phocaea (now Foça, in modern Turkey) on the Aegean coast of Asia Minor. A second wave of colonists arrived in about 540, when Phocaea was destroyed by the Persians.

Massalia became one of the major trading ports of the ancient world. At its height, in the 4th century BC, it had a population of about 6,000 inhabitants, on about fifty hectares surrounded by a wall. It was governed as an aristocratic republic, by an assembly of the 600 wealthiest citizens. It had a large temple of the cult of Apollo of Delphi on a hilltop overlooking the port and a temple of the cult of Artemis of Ephesus at the other end of the city. Drachma coins minted in Massalia were found in all parts of Ligurian-Celtic Gaul. Traders from Massalia ventured into France on the Durance and Rhône rivers, established overland trade routes to Switzerland and Burgundy, and travelled as far north as the Baltic Sea. They exported their own products: local wine, salted pork and fish, aromatic and medicinal plants, coral and cork.

The Massalians established a series of small colonies and trading posts along the coast, which later became towns. They founded Citharista (La Ciotat), Tauroeis (Le Brusc), Olbia (near Hyères), Pergantion (Breganson), Caccabaria (Cavalaire), Athenopolis (Saint-Tropez), Antipolis (Antibes), Nikaia (Nice), and Monoicos (Monaco). They had a strong cultural influence on the interior of Provence — the Salyen oppidum of Glanum had villas and an outdoor public meeting area built in the classical Greek style.

The most famous citizen of Massalia was the mathematician, astronomer and navigator Pytheas. Pytheas made mathematical instruments which allowed him to establish almost exactly the latitude of Marseille. He was the first scientist to observe that the tides were connected with the phases of the moon. Between 330 and 320 BC he organized an expedition by ship into the Atlantic and as far north as England; he visited Iceland, Shetland, and Norway, where he was the first scientist to describe drift ice and the midnight sun. Though he hoped to establish a sea trading route for tin from Cornwall, his trip was not a commercial success, and it was not repeated. The Massalians found it cheaper and simpler to trade with Northern Europe over land routes.

== Roman Provence (2nd century BC to 5th century AD) ==
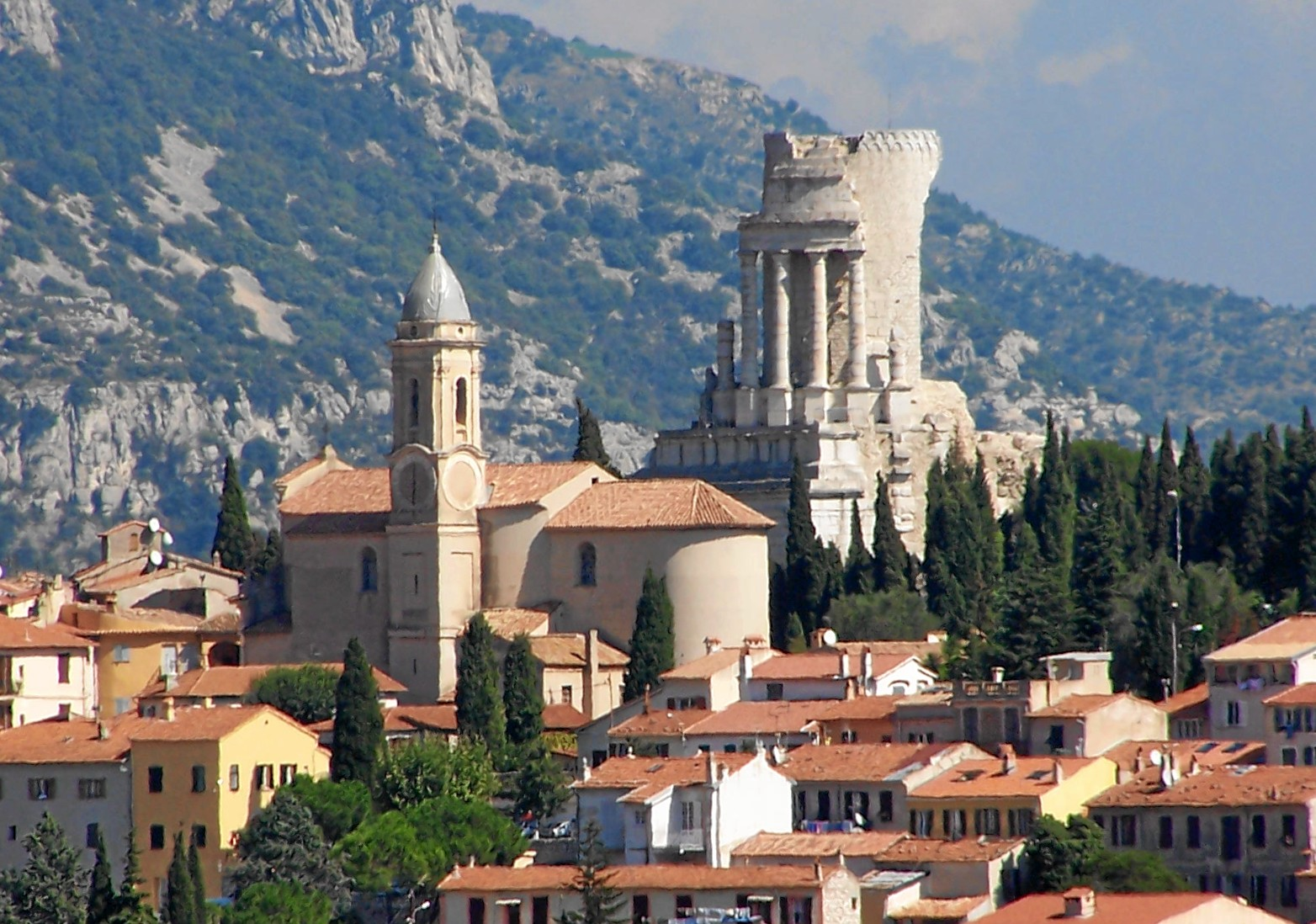
The ruins of the Tropaeum Alpium (Trophy of the Alps), in La Turbie, near Monaco, built by Augustus Caesar in 6 BC to commemorate the victory of Julius Caesar over the Ligurian tribes of the southern Alps. The monument marked the eastern border of Roman Provence.

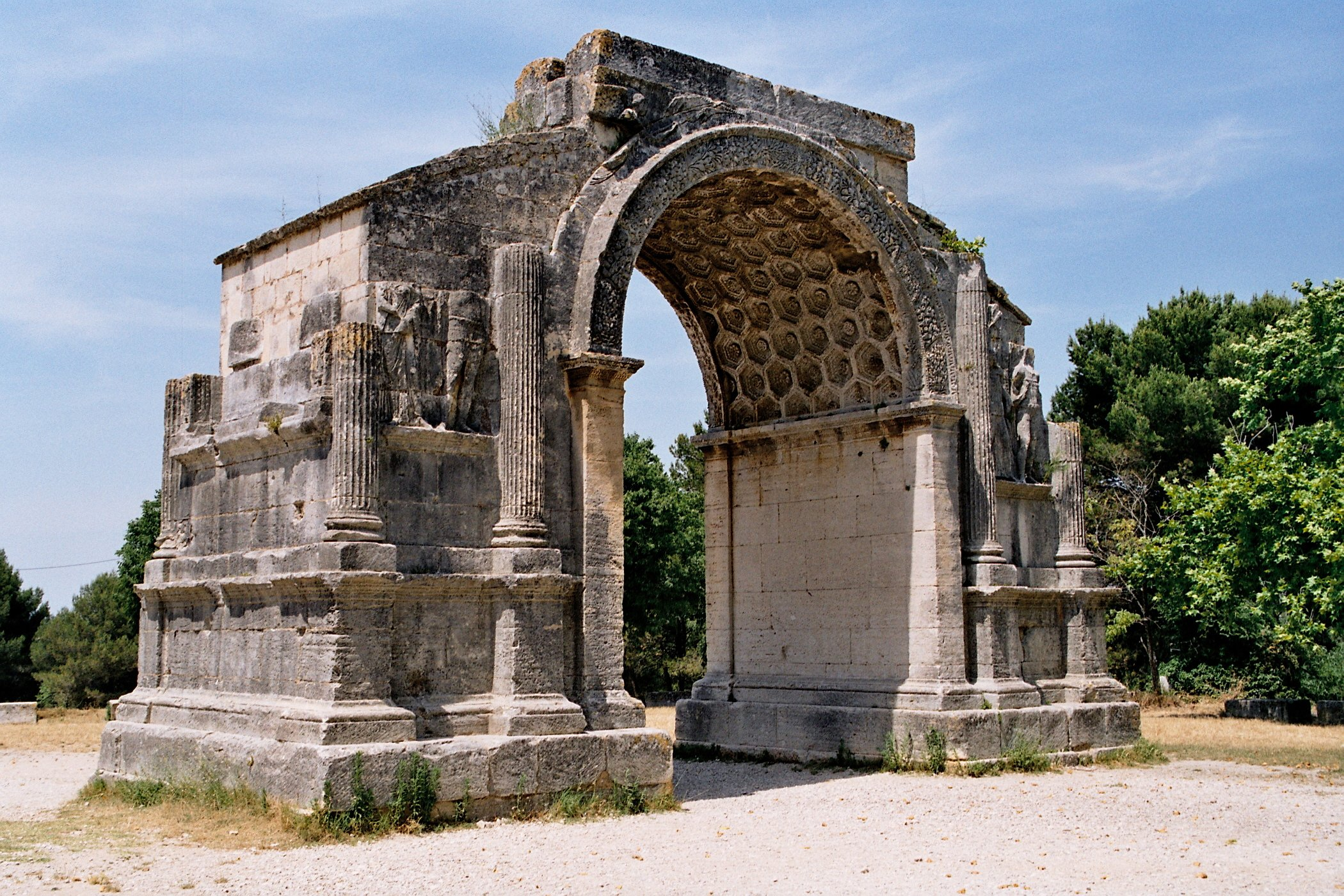
Roman triumphal arch near Saint-Remy-de-Provence, 1st Century A.D.

=== Roman conquest of Provence ===
In 218 BC, when Hannibal marched the armies of Carthage through Provence on their way to Italy to attack Rome, the Massalians and Romans became allies. The Romans sent sixty ships with two legions led by Publius Cornelius Scipio to Massalia in an unsuccessful attempt to intercept Hannibal. In 207 BC, when Hasdrubal Barca led another Carthaginian army to attack Rome, Rome and Massalia became allies again. The Roman orator Cicero referred to Massalians as "The most faithful allies of the Romans."

The Massalians had good trade relations with peoples throughout Gaul. They were not a great military power and often had difficult relations with their neighbors, the Ligurian and Celtic Gauls. In the 2nd century BC the Massalians appealed to Rome for help against the Gauls. They did not understand that Rome wanted subjects, not allies.

In 181 BC at the request of Massalia, the Romans suppressed Ligurian pirates based along the coast between Genoa and Albenga. Then, in 154 BC, when a Roman ambassador was abused and attacked at Cagnes, the Roman consul Quintus Opimius led an army into Provence and defeated the Oxybii and the Deciates. Rome re-established the authority of Massalia along the coast from the rock of Monaco to the mouth of the Argens river.

In 125 BC, an alliance of Celtic peoples, the Salyes, threatened Massalia itself. In 125 a Roman army led by the consul Marcus Fulvius Flaccus crossed the Alps by either the Col de Montgenèvre or Col de Larche, marched along the valley of the Durance, and subdued the Ligures of Barcelonette, the Vocontii and the Salyes. The following year another Roman army, led by Gaius Sextius Calvinus, marched into Provence and captured the capital of the Salyes, the hilltop fortress of Oppidum d'Entremont, as well as the sanctuary of Roquepertuse and the oppida of Saint-Blaise and Baou Roux.

After the battle Sextus Calvinus destroyed the hilltop fortress of Entremont. At the foot of the hill, where thermal springs were located, he founded a new town, called Aquae Sextiae ("The Waters of Sextius"). Later it became known simply as Aix, then as Aix-en-Provence.

In 122 BC the Romans faced a new uprising of the Gauls, led by another Salye chief, Teutonmotulus, who was joined in his uprising by the Arverni and the Allobroges. A new Roman consul, Dimitius Ahenobargus, met the Gauls with a new and terrifying weapon, elephants, and was able to defeat the much larger Gallic army at the battle of Vindalium on the Sorgue river.

In 121 BC a new Roman army led by Quintus Fabius Maximus Allobrogicus came to Provence to reinforce Domitius. Domitius defeated a Gallic army of Allobroges and Arverni on the plains of the Rhône Valley. One hundred thousand Gauls were killed in the battle. After the battle Domitius claimed the entire territory between Italy and Spain as a Roman province. In 118 BC, at the mouth of the Aude river, his soldiers founded the first Roman colony outside of Italy, called Narbo Martius (later Narbonne). Within this territory, only the Greek port colony of Massalia remained independent.

In 109 BC Provence faced a new invasion from the north. An enormous migration of Celto-Germanic tribes, the Teutons and Cimbri, left the Baltic coast and moved south into Gaul, looking for a new homeland. They moved into the Rhône Valley and in 105 BC defeated the Roman legions of Gnaeus Mallius Maximus and Servilus Caepio at Arausio (the modern town of Orange).

The Romans sent one of their best generals, Gaius Marius, to Provence with six legions to block the path of the Teutons and Cimbri toward Italy. Gaius Marius waited patiently for two years, while the Teutons and Cimbri ventured into Spain and northern Gaul. The Roman general kept his soldiers busy digging a canal next to the Rhône between Arles and Fos, allowing his soldiers to be supplied from the sea and also making navigation much easier through the Rhône delta. In 102 BC the Cimbres went east while the Teutons and their new allies, the Ambrones marched south through Provence, heading toward northern Italy. Gaius Marius met them near Aix in the autumn of 102 BC and defeated them, killing, according to Plutarch, one hundred thousand Teutons and Ambrones. Italy and Provence were safe from invasion for a century afterward.

The most famous of the proconsuls of the new province called Narbonensis was Julius Caesar, who governed it from 58 to 49 BC. He was rarely there, using Narbonensis as a supply base for his famous wars against the Gauls further north.(See Gallic Wars.)

Until this time the city of Massalia had guarded its independence and profited from its alliance with Rome. However, in 49 BC, when the struggle for the leadership of Rome began between Pompey the Great and Julius Caesar, the leaders of Massalia made the fatal decision to back Pompey. (See Caesar's Civil War). Caesar immediately sent an army to Massalia and besieged the city. He built long trenches around the town, as he had done against the Gauls at Alesia; and cut down the sacred forests of the Ligures to build siege towers. He also had a dozen warships built at Arles and his new fleet, led by his legate Decimus Junius Brutus Albinus, defeated the Massalian fleet off the isles of the Frioul archipelago, and blockaded the city from the sea. Disease ravaged the population. In September 49 BC, the soldiers of Caesar's legate Trebonius breached the walls of Massalia and captured it. The Massalians paid a heavy price for backing Pompey; the city lost its independence, had to surrender its warships and treasury, and was forced to give up all of its territories on the coast and interior, except for the Stoechades islands and Nice.

The final phase of the Roman conquest of Provence took place between 24 BC and 14 BC, when the Emperor Augustus Caesar sent an army to conquer the last Ligurian tribes, around modern Sisteron, Digne, Castellane and other mountainous valleys, who still resisted Roman domination. In 8 BC the Emperor Augustus built a triumphal monument at La Turbie to commemorate the final pacification of the region.

=== The Pax Romana in Provence ===
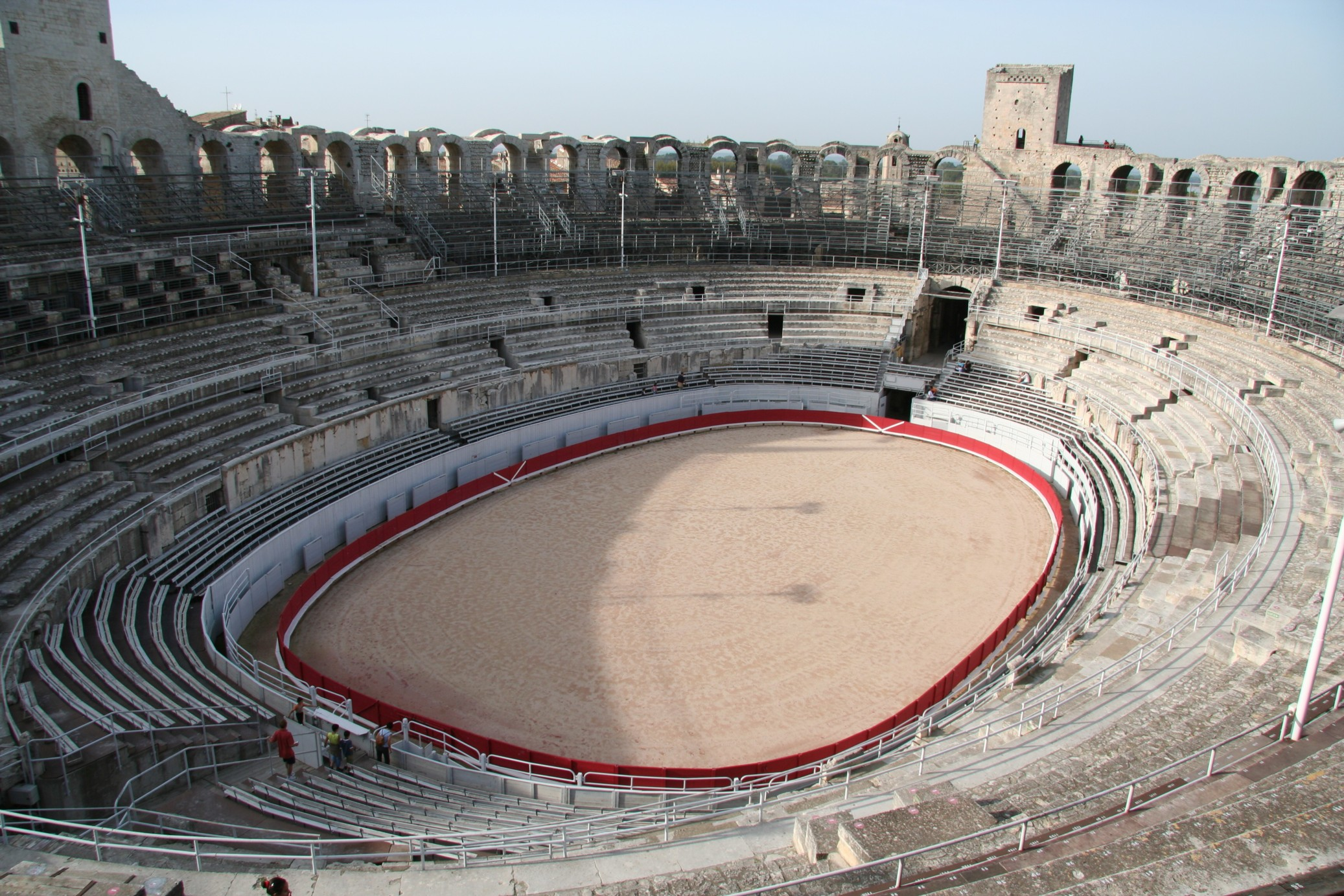
The Roman arena at Arles (2nd century AD)

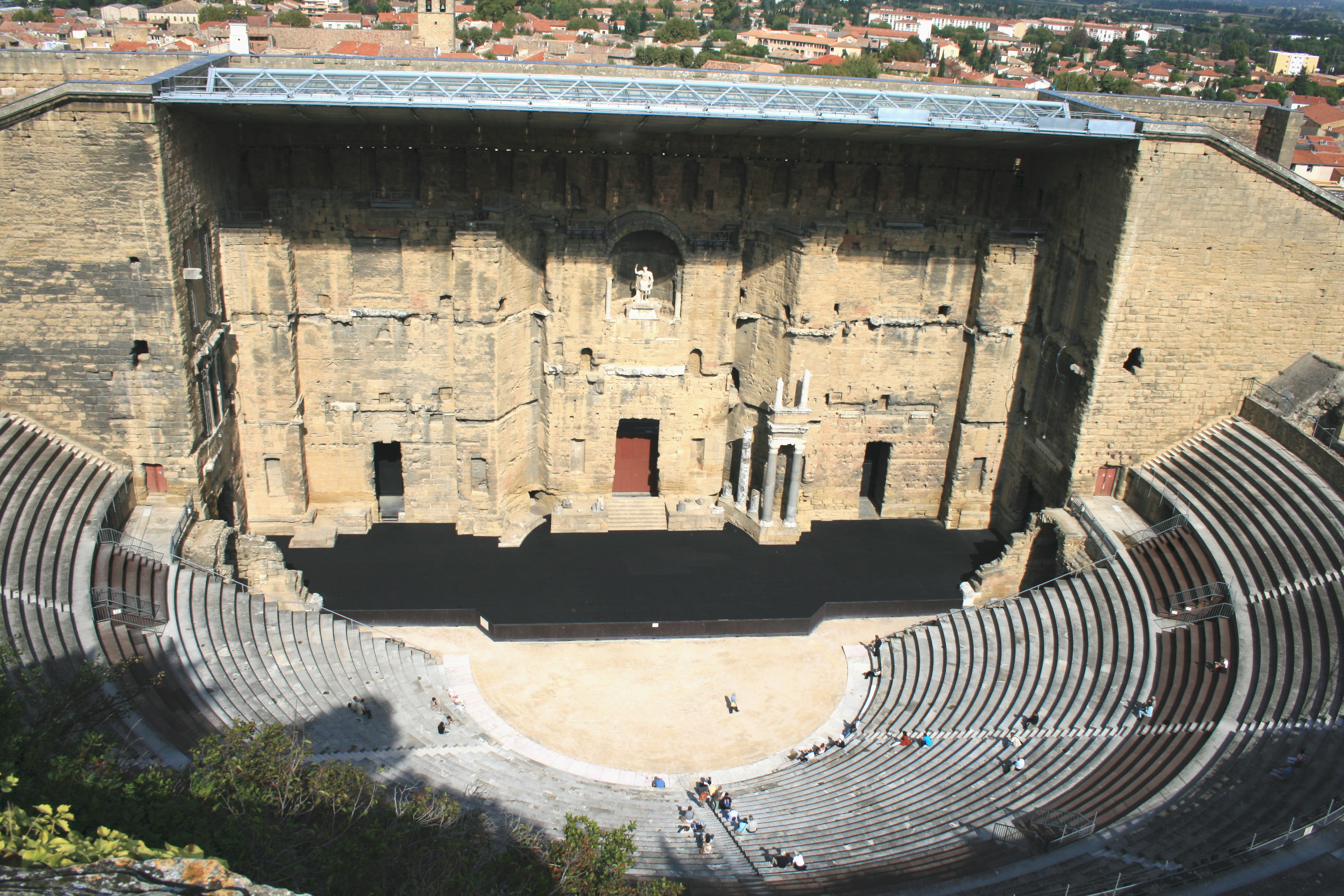
The Roman Theater in Orange, Vaucluse

The Pax Romana, or Roman Peace, in Provence lasted for nearly three centuries. During this period, all of Provence, from the Alps to the Pyrenées, for the first time had the same language, administration, currency and culture. Residents of Provence felt secure enough to give up their fortified hilltop towns and move down into the plains. Pliny the Elder wrote "it was more than a province, it was another Italy."

In addition to the vast province of Gallia Narbonensis, which reached all the way to Spain, with its capital at Narbonne, in 7 BC the Emperor Augustus created Alpes Maritimae, where the Alps met the Mediterranean, with its capital at Cemenelum (now Cimiez), in the hills above present-day Nice; and also created a small client kingdom called Alpes Cottiae, in the Alps along the Italian border further north, with its capital at Segusium, the modern-day Susa in Piedmont. The Emperor Nero officially made Alpes Cottiae a Roman province in 67 AD. The purpose of these new provinces was to secure the passes of the Alps for the passage of Roman armies and traders.

The Romans established twenty-five towns and a common system of administration throughout Provence. Julius Caesar created three coloniae, or colonies, for the veterans of his legions at Forum Julii (now Fréjus), Arles and Arausio (now Orange, Vaucluse. Citizens of these towns had the full rights of Roman citizens, including the right to vote. The Emperor August founded seven more colonies of Roman army veterans at Apt, Avignon, Carpentras, Cavaillon Die, Digne, and Riez.

Other types of towns, classified as either municipia or civitates, were founded throughout the rest of Provence. Some of the capital towns or villages of Gallic tribes were transformed into Roman municipia; The capital of the Brigantes tribe became the Roman muncipium of Briançon. The residents of these muncipia and civitates had most of the rights and obligations of Roman citizens, but no vote.

To connect these towns and allow easy movement of Roman armies between Italy and Spain or up the Rhône Valley, Roman engineers constructed a series of new roads, solidly built and regularly maintained. The oldest was the Via Domitia, built in 118 BC, which went all the way from the Col de Montgenèvre, the easiest crossing point of the Alps, through Sisteron, Apt and Cavaillon to Tarascon on the Rhône, and then along the coast to Narbonne and to Spain. The Via Aurelia ran from Italy to the Rhône Valley, passing through Cimiez, Fréjus, and Aix. The Via Agrippa ran up the Rhône Valley from Arles to Lyon, through Avignon, Orange, and Valence. It was completely rebuilt six times during the height of the Roman Empire.

After Massalia lost its independence and its territories, the town of Arles became the most important economic center of Provence. It had inherited the territories taken from Massalia, it had the most important bridge across the Rhône, and it was the meeting point of the trade routes along the coast and up and down the Rhône. The major products of Provence were wheat, oil, pork, mutton, the sausages and other preserved meats of Avignon and Arles, and fish from Antibes and Fréjus. The Emperor Domitian banned the planting of vineyards in Provence, but the region around Marseille still produced famous wines and all the cities of Provence imported wines from Italy.

Arles and the other towns of Provence were the showcases of Roman wealth, culture and power. The Roman amphitheater at Arles could seat twenty thousand spectators. Roman engineers and architects built monuments, theaters, baths, villas, fora, arenas and aqueducts throughout Provence, many of which still exist. (See Architecture of Provence.)

The Pax Romana in Provence lasted until the middle of the third century. Germanic tribes invaded Provence in 257 and 275. At the beginning the 4th century, the court of Roman Emperor Constantine (280-337) was forced to take refuge in Arles. By the end of the 5th century, Roman power in Provence had vanished, and an age of invasions, wars, and chaos began.

== The end of the Roman Empire and the arrival of Christianity (3rd-6th centuries AD) ==
In 297, the Emperor Diocletian redrew the provincial borders within the Roman Empire, dividing Gallia Narbonensis into two provinces. The new province east of the Rhône was called Viennensis, after its capital, Vienne. In 397, this new province was split in two; The Province of Vienne kept the Rhône Valley, Arles and Vienne, while a new province, called Narbonensis the Second, was created, with its capital at Aix. The Romans also added new layers of administration, called dioceses and prefectures, and new officials to govern the provinces.

During the late 3rd century, invasions of the Franks and Alemanni ravaged other parts of Roman Gaul, but Provence was largely spared. The high walls of Arles and Marseille successfully resisted Germanic invaders. The ports of Provence prospered, thanks to their trade with the Roman Mediterranean world. Toulon produced the special purple dye used for the robes of the Emperors. Marseille developed a profitable commerce, first importing and then making elaborate carved sarcophagi for the wealthy residents of all of Gaul. Communities of Syrians, Phoenicians and Jews settled in Marseille and Arles. Arles built a new port on the right bank of the Rhône, and in 418 the Roman Emperor Honorius wrote of Arles that "All the riches of the orient, perfumes of Arabia, delicacies of Assyria, are found in such abundance there that one would believe they were the products of the countryside." The circus and amphitheater of Arles were still being used for Roman games in the 4th century. The Emperor Constantine himself visited Arles in 314 and 316. The Emperors Avitus and Majorien, among the last of the Roman emperors, resided there respectively in 455 and 459.

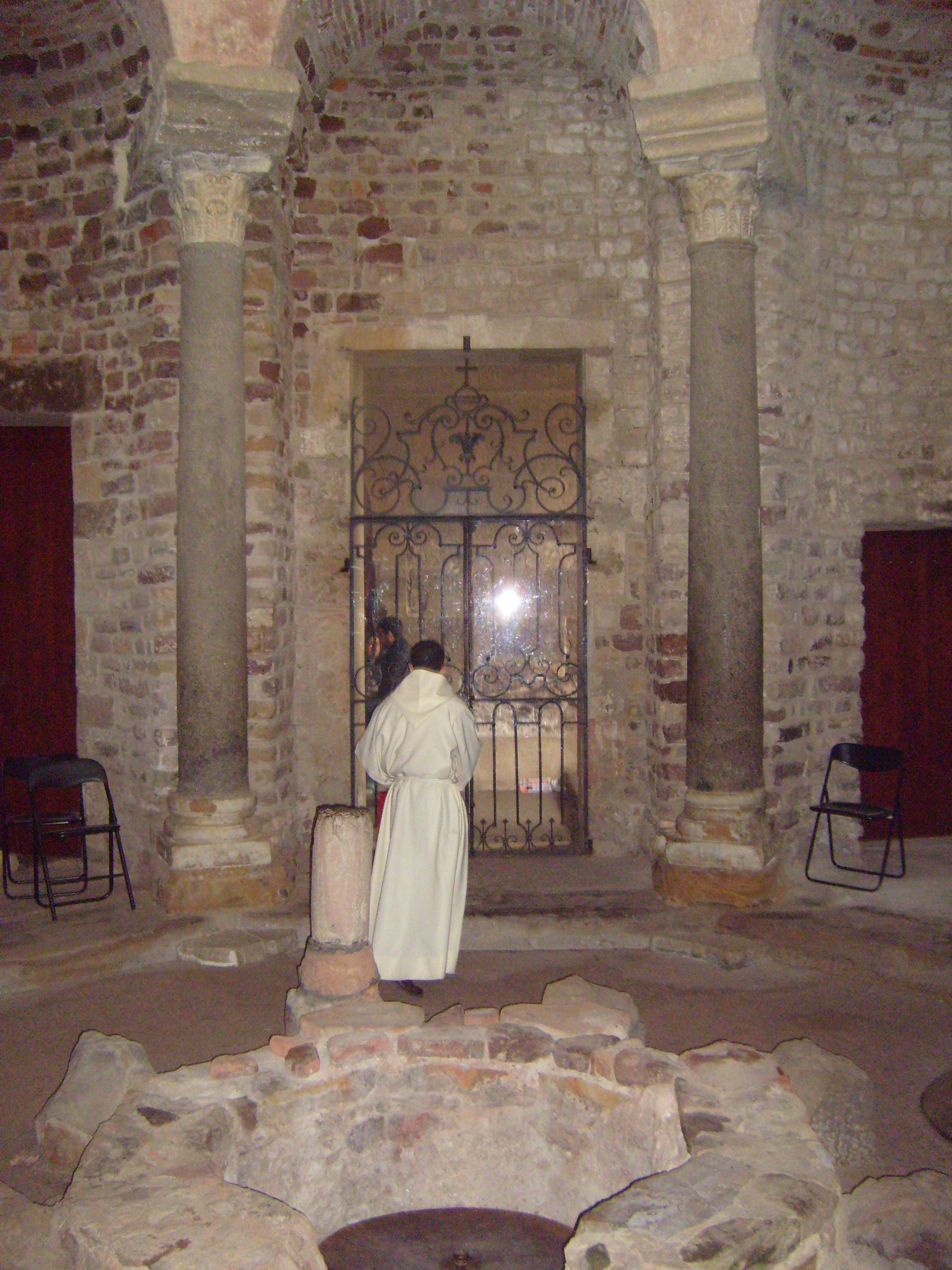
The baptistery of Fréjus Cathedral (5th century) is still in use

During Roman times the people of Provence worshiped a wide variety of gods and religions; they worshiped goddesses of fecundity (called matres), gods living in springs of fresh water (such as the Vediantiae at Cimiez); gods of nature (the mistral wind, worshipped as Circius); and Mont Sainte-Victoire, worshipped under its Ligure name, Vintur. They worshiped deities which combined Roman and Ligure-Celtic gods, such as Mars-Teutates, worshiped at Aix and Orange. In the large cities, they worshiped the traditional Roman gods and goddesses: Jupiter, Juno and Minerva were worshiped in Arles and Aix. In Marseille, they worshiped the Greek goddesses of the sea.

Since the time of Julius Caesar, they also worshiped the official cult of the Roman emperors and later the empresses. From the time of Emperor Vespasian, an official of this cult, called the flamen Augusti, was designated each year to oversee worship of the emperors, placing their busts and shrines throughout Provence.

Later in the Empire, Eastern cults began to take hold in Provence: traces of the cult of Mithra have been found in Arles, Vaison and Glanum; of the Syrian god Baal in Marseille; and the Egyptian goddess Isis at Marseille and Arles; and most popular of all, Cybele, the "mother of deities", worshiped at Marseille, Arles, Vence, Vaison, Riez, and Die.

There were many legends about the earliest Christians in Provence. One claimed that the bishop of Arles, Lazarus, buried at Marseille, was the same Lazarus healed by Jesus; another claimed that his sister Martha came to Provence to convert Tarascon; another popular legend claimed that Saints Mary Magdalene, Mary Salome and Mary Jacobe came to Saintes-Maries-de-la-Mer in the Camargue by boat and settled in the mountains at Sainte-Baume. A skull which is described as that of Mary Magdalene is displayed in the basilica of Saint-Maximin-la-Sainte-Baume. These legends first appeared during the Carolingian period. Relics claiming to be those of the Three Marys were discovered in the 15th century and put on display. However, there is no other historical evidence to support these legends.

In the second quarter of the 3rd century the Christian Church in Rome began to send missionaries to evangelize Provence. By Catholic tradition, the first bishops in Provence were Trophimus of Arles and Paul of Narbonne. There were active churches and bishops in Arles in 254, in Marseille in 314, in Orange, in Vaison and Apt in 314, in Cavaillon, Digne, Embrun, Gap, and Fréjus at the end of the 4th century, Aix-en-Provence in 408, Carpentras, Avignon, Riez, Cimiez and Vence in 439, Antibes in 442, Toulon in 451, Senez in 406, Saint-Paul-Trois-Châteaux in 517; and Glandèves in 541.

At the beginning of the 4th century, with the conversion and baptism of Constantine, Christianity became the official religion of the Empire. Later, under the Emperors Gratian and Theodosius, Christianity was not only permitted, it was required. Churches were built in all the large cities of Provence, usually near the city walls, and often using the sites and even the pillars and other architectural elements of old Roman temples. A baptistry was usually constructed next to the church. The oldest still-existing Christian structure in Provence is the baptistery of the cathedral in Fréjus, dating from the 5th century. By the 5th century there were twenty-one bishops in Provence, and chapels on the large estates and churches in almost every town.

At about the same time, in the 5th century, the first two monasteries in Provence were founded: Lérins, on an island near Cannes and Saint-Victor in Marseille. The monasteries became the centers of learning and religious doctrine for Provence and for much of Gaul. Monks from Lerins Abbey became bishops in Arles, Cimiez, Vence, Riez, and other cities in Provence; they actively promoted the cult of saints, local martyrs, and of the Virgin Mary.

== Goths, Burgundians and Franks in Provence (5th–6th centuries) ==
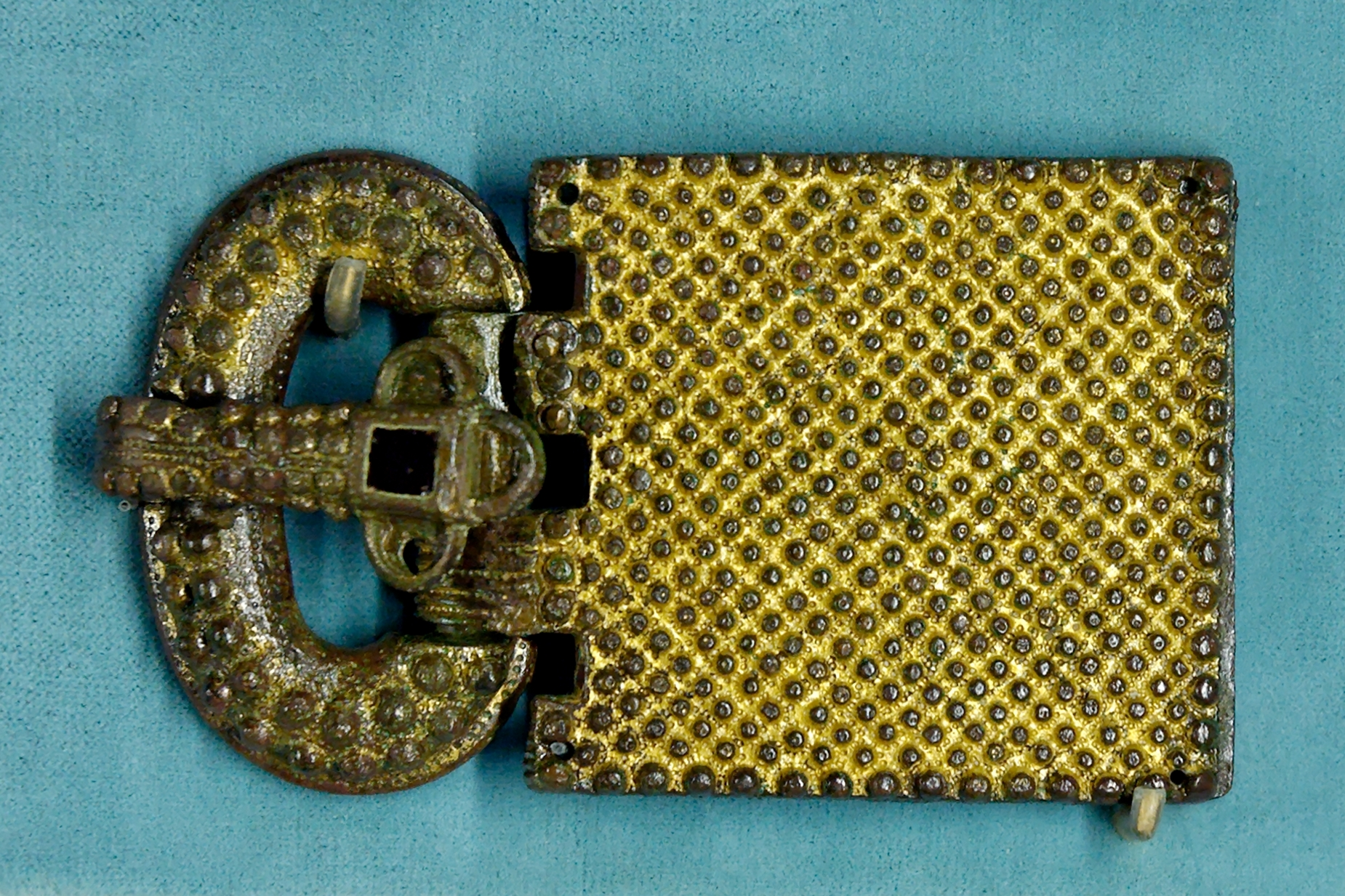
A Visigothic buckle, found in the Visigothic necropolis at Tressan

In 412, the Visigoths of Alaric, after capturing Rome itself and the death of their leader, passed through Provence on their way to Aquitaine and Spain, and occupied the entire region between the Atlantic and the Rhône. They unsuccessfully attacked Arles in 425, 452, and 458. But Roman power could no longer defend Provence. An army of Burgundians swept down the Rhône Valley as far as Valence and the valley of the Durance. In 471 an army of Visigoths led by Euric defeated the army of the Roman Emperor Anthemius. The valley of the lower Rhône was ravaged by the Visigoths, and Arles was threatened with famine. In 476 the last emperor of the Western Roman Empire was deposed in Ravenna, and Euric entered Arles and Marseille without a battle.

With the fall of the Western Roman Empire, the Visigoths and Burgundians divided Provence. The Visigoths ruled the lands south of the Durance, while the Burgundians ruled the lands to the north. The Germanic rulers installed their own system of government: Each city was ruled by a count (comes), and a group of cities was ruled by a duke (dux). The arrival of the Germanic invaders brought a decline to the fortunes of Arles and a resurgence of Marseille, which imported spices and other goods from around the Mediterranean.

The rule of the Visigoths in Provence was short-lived; their king, Alaric II, was defeated by Clovis I, King of the Franks, in 507. The Burgundians, allied with the Franks, tried to take all of Provence for themselves. They were stopped by another Germanic power, the Ostrogoths, led by Theodoric, who entered Provence, lifted the Burgundian siege of Arles, and took Marseille and Avignon in 508. Theodoric was both a Germanic king and an ally of the Byzantine Empire; under his rule Provence was officially, though loosely, attached to the Eastern Roman Empire.

The rule of the Ostrogoths lasted little more than thirty years. After the death of Theodoric the Merovingian kings of the Franks gradually claimed the Gothic territories; in 532 they annexed Burgundy and laid siege to Arles. In 536, the Eastern Roman Emperor Justinian ceded all of Provence to the Merovingian kings.

The Merovingians were the first northern European rulers to govern Provence. They had their capitals in Soissons, Metz, Paris, Orléans, and Reims, and rarely visited the south. After 561, Provence was split between two distant Merovingian kings; Sigebert I, the king of Austrasia, ruled Marseille, Aix and Avignon, while Guntram, the King of Burgundy, ruled the eastern part of Provence.

The second half of the 6th century was a terrible time for Provence; the region suffered continual conflicts between the two kings, attacks by Lombards and Saxon raiders, and epidemics of plague and other diseases. Irrigation works built by the Romans fell into ruins and the fields which the Romans had drained in the Rhône Valley turned back into marshes. Roman buildings and aqueducts were not maintained. The amphitheater at Arles and the theater at Orange were abandoned and filled with residences. Populations left the cities and moved to fortified villages on the hilltops. The only city to thrive was the port of Marseille, supported by its commerce with the east.

One enduring legacy of the Merovingian rule is the current northern boundary of Provence; beginning at this time, the name "Provincia" was given to the Ostrogoth and Visigoth territories south of a line midway between the Isère and the Durance rivers.

== The Franks and Arabs in Provence (7th-9th century) ==
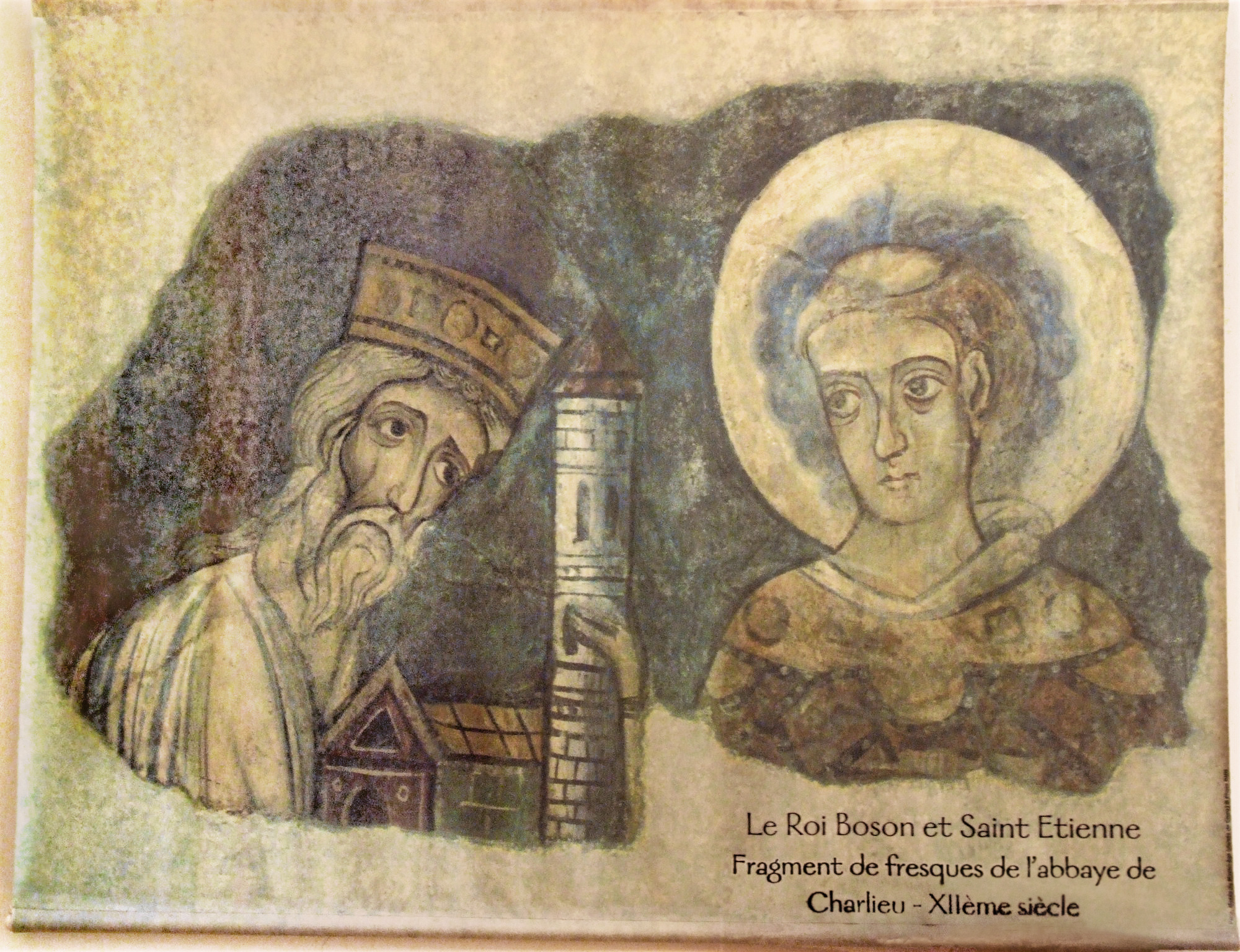
King Boso of Provence and Saint Stephen (fragment of fresco at Charlieu Abbey)

Beginning in the 8th century, Provence became the frontier and battleground between the Frankish kings of the Merovingian dynasty and the expanding new power in the Mediterranean world, the Arabs, called the Saracens by the French. The Frankish Mayor of the Palace, Charles Martel, defeated the Arabs at the Battle of Tours in 732 and kept them from advancing further north, but the Arabs remained a formidable power on the Mediterranean coast.

In 736 Arles and Marseille and other towns of western Provence rebelled against Charles Martel, and installed their own leader. Charles Martel invaded Provence and recaptured and punished the rebel towns. In 737 the cities of Provence rebelled again, this time calling for help from the Arabs. Once again Charles Martel sent an army to Provence, capturing Avignon and massacring a large part of the population. The rebellion broke out again in 739, and Charles Martel was forced to bring in Lombard warriors from Italy as allies to fight the Arabs and bring Provence under control.

The reign of Charlemagne over the Frankish kingdom (768-814) brought a period of relative calm and order to Provence, but the region was desperately poor; the coastal and river trade that had made Provence such a prosperous part of the Roman Empire had halted, and the region was reduced to living from the cultivation of its poor and rocky soil.

When the successors of Charlemagne began to quarrel and divide the empire, the troubles of Provence began again. Invaders came by sea to raid the coast and the Rhône Valley. In 838 Marseille was captured and devastated by Arab pirates, who destroyed the Abbey of Saint Victor. In 849 the city was attacked again, this time by Byzantine pirates. Arles was pillaged in 842 but resisted an Arab attack in 850. During the same period, a band of Normans arrived by sea from the Atlantic and settled in the Camargue, using it as a base to raid the towns on the coast and in the Rhône Valley.

In 855, following the death of the Carolinian Emperor Lothair I, a distinctive kingdom was briefly created for his third son Charles (d. 863), encompassing the Lower Burgundy with Provence. The realm was composed of the lands between the Rhône, the Alps and the Mediterranean, and reached north as far as Uzès, Viviers and Lyon.

The Carolingian Empire continued to disintegrate as the successors quarreled. Two years after the death of the Emperor Charles the Bald in 877, his brother-in-law, Boso of Provence (also known as Boson) brought together the high clergy and the principal counts of southeast France at Mantaille, near Vienne, and had himself declared King of Provence. He was immediately challenged by the other Carolingian rulers because he was not of Carolingian blood, and had to flee into the mountains of Diois, but refused to renounce the throne. The situation was confused until he died in 887, and his widow, Ermengarde, who was of Carolingian blood, had their son Louis adopted by the Emperor Charles the Fat. This solved the problem of legitimacy and succession; Louis was crowned King of an independent kingdom of Provence in 890.

== First Counts of Provence ==
For four centuries Provence was ruled by a series of Counts or Marquises of Provence. They were nominally vassals of the crumbling Carolingian Empire, of Burgundy, Catalonia, or the Holy Roman Empire, but in practice they were independent rulers.

The Bosonids were the descendants of Boso the Elder, whose grandson Boso of Provence became king. Louis the Blind, the son of the younger Boso, was not satisfied with Provence, and aspired to become king of Italy and emperor, basing his claim on the fact that he was grandson of the Carolingian emperor Louis II. He had some success at first, and was crowned Emperor by Pope Benedict V in Rome in 901, but then was defeated and captured by his rival, Berengar I of Italy. He promised to leave Italy forever, and Berengar released him, but the following year he attacked Italy again. He was again captured by Berengar at a battle at Verona and blinded for breaking his promise. He was sent back to Provence, where he ruled until his death in 928.

During the last part of the reign of Louis the Blind, Provence was effectively governed by his cousin Hugh of Arles, as Duke of Provence. He moved the capital of Provence from Vienne to Arles. Hugh, like Louis, aspired to become King of Italy, but with more success. When Berengar died, Hugh claimed the title and was crowned in Pavia in 926. In 933, he gave Provence to Rudolph II of Burgundy, in exchange for Rudolph relinquishing his claims on Italy. In 947, king Hugh he was chased out of Italy and forced to return to Arles, where he became a monk and died in 948.

In 937, the rule over Provence passed to king Conrad of Burgundy, also known as Conrad the Peaceful, who named the counts of Arles, Avignon and Apt, and viscounts of Cavaillon and Marseille, all of whom were of Burgundian origin.

== Expulsion of the Saracens ==
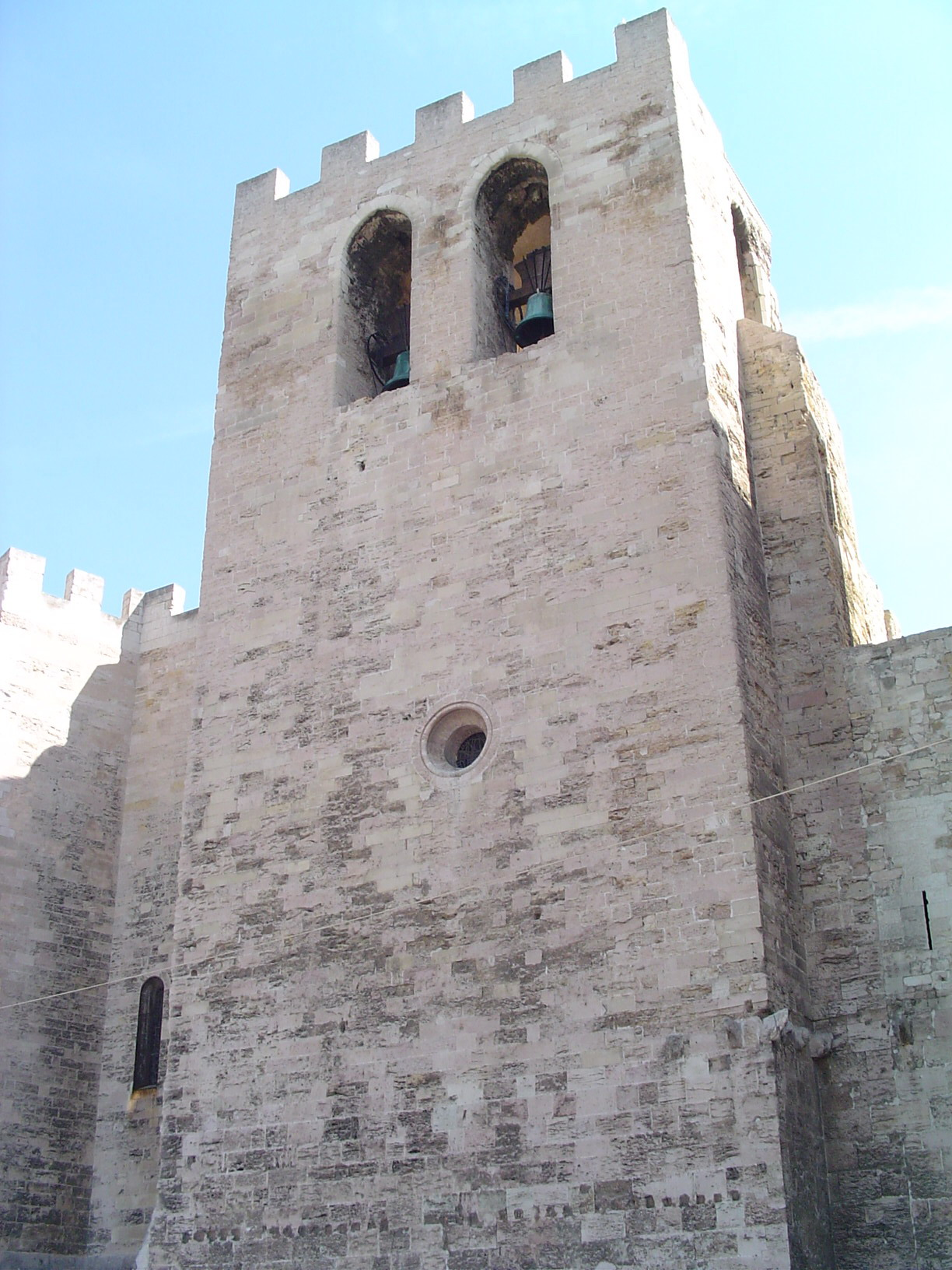
The Abbey of St. Victor, Marseille was destroyed by Saracen pirates in either 731 or 838 then rebuilt in the 11th century

A Burgundian Count, Rotbald of Arles, would give rise to a new dynasty who would become the Counts of Provence. They would control the county for the next century and a half.

While Louis the Blind and Hugh had been occupied in Italy, the Muslim Saracens in Provence had established a base on the coast called Fraxinetum, near modern-day Saint-Tropez, from which they controlled the mountains of the Massif des Maures and the coast between modern Fréjus and Hyères. Between 900 and 910, and 925 and 940, the Saracens raided throughout Provence. They usually avoided walled towns but attacked isolated villas and monasteries. They raided from the Rhône as far east as the Italian Riviera, to Albenga and Sanremo, and north to the alpine valleys of Piedmont, where they pillaged the monasteries of San Dalmazzo near Cuneo and Novalaise near Suse.

Louis the Blind attempted to expel the Saracens from Provence without success. Hugh of Italy enlisted the Byzantine fleet to blockade Fraxinetum, and was preparing an attack, when an uprising in Italy forced him to cancel his plans.

In 973, the Saracens captured Mayeul, the abbot of the monastery at Cluny, and held him for ransom. The ransom was paid and the abbot was released. Count William I, the Count of Arles, organized an army with the help of allied soldiers from Piedmont, and defeated the Saracens near La Garde-Freinet at the Battle of Tourtour. The Saracens who were not killed at the battle were forcibly baptized and made into slaves, and the remaining Saracens in Provence fled the region.

The expulsion of the Saracens in 973 became an epic event in the history and legends of Provence. William became known as "William the Liberator." He distributed the lands taken from the Saracens between Toulon and Nice to his entourage. His descendants became the recognized leaders of Provence, above the other counts of the region.

During this long period of wars and banditry in Provence, the population retreated to walled cities, maritime trade was rare, and little new art or architecture, other than fortification, was created. The Provençal language was formed, based on Latin and closer to Latin than the French spoken in northern France. In the 11th century Provençal terms began to appear, mixed with Latin, in documents.

== Catalan dynasty (12th-13th century) ==
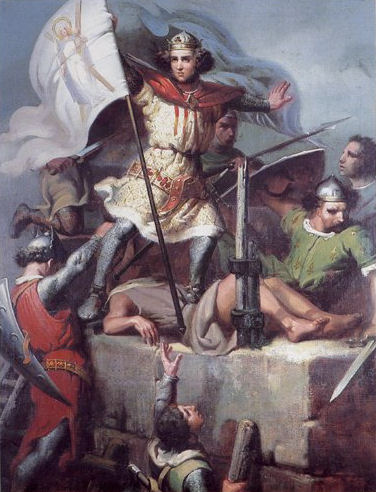
The Catalan Ramon Berenguer I, Count of Provence, in the Castle in Fos, painted by Marià Fortuny (Reial Acadèmia Catalana de Belles Arts de Sant Jordi, on deposit at the Palace of the Generalitat of Catalonia, Barcelona).

The German Emperor Conrad the Salic forced the childless King of Burgundy, Rudolph III, to name him as successor which in 1032 led to Provence becoming a fiefdom of the Holy Roman Empire, which it remained until the 15th century.

There was a tradition of shared inheritance practiced by the family of the Counts, leading to two lines each using the title of Count. In 1112, a descendant of Count William I, Douce I, Countess of Provence, married the Catalan Ramon Berenguer III, Count of Barcelona, who as a result became Raymond Berenguer I, Count of Provence. He ruled Provence until 1131, and his descendants, the Catalan Dynasty, ruled Provence until 1246.

The claim of the other line, sometimes using the title of Margraves of Provence, passed by marriage to William III, Count of Toulouse. This led to a long-standing Toulouse claim to the county, finally resolved by partition in 1125. Provence north and west of the Durance went to the Count of Toulouse, while the lands between the Durance and the Mediterranean, and from the Rhône to the Alps, stayed with the Counts of Provence. The capital of Provence was moved from Arles to Aix-en-Provence, and later to Brignoles. A shorter lasting partition in the next generation, between the County of Provence and the County of Forcalquier. was ended by an intra-dynastic marriage in 1193.

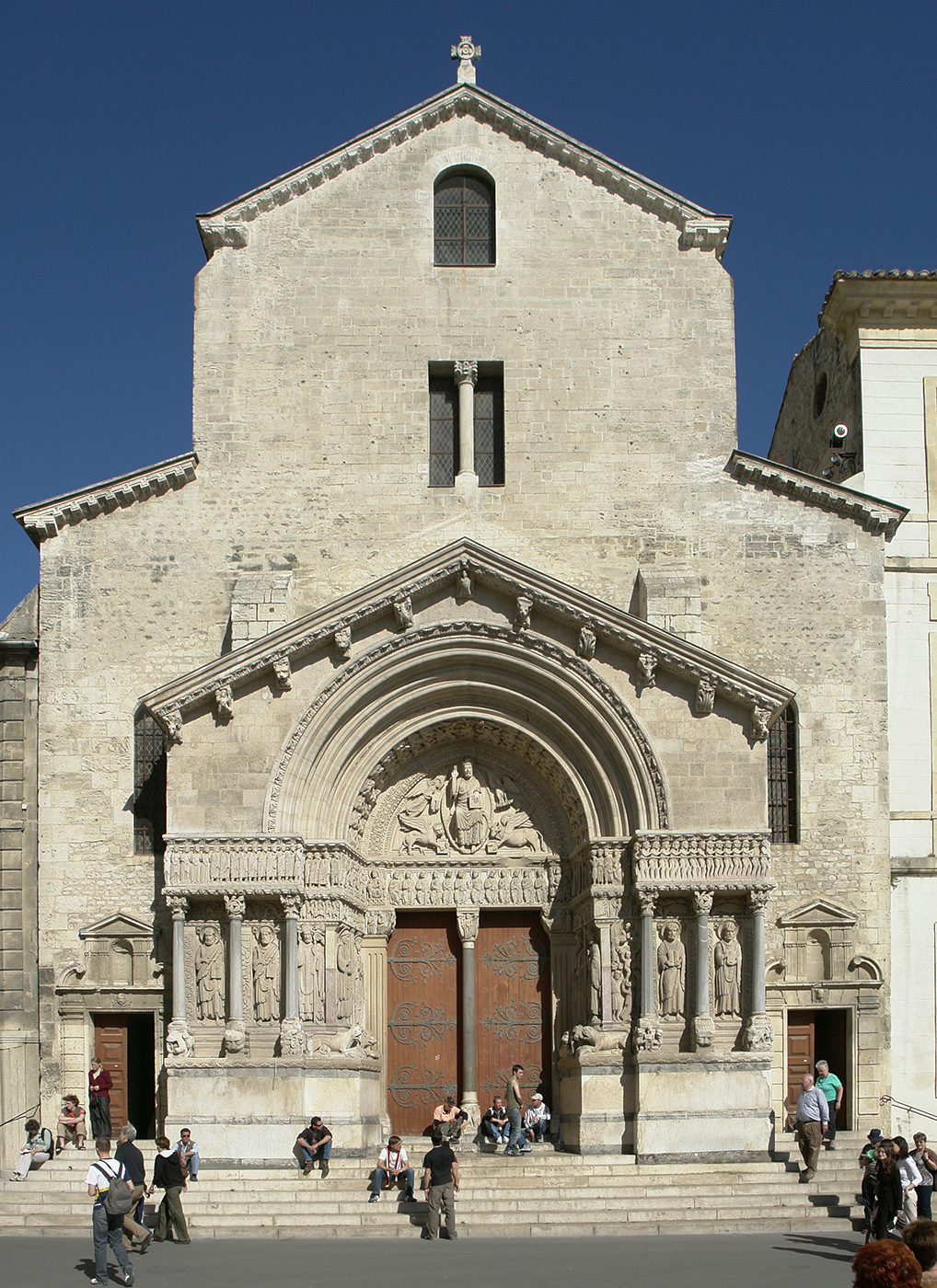
The Church of Saint Trophime in Arles (12th century

Following the Crusades, international commerce began to resume in the ports of the Mediterranean and along the Rhône. The port of Marseille flourished again. A new city built on the Petit-Rhône, Saint-Gilles, became a transit point for cloth from Flanders and spices and the products of the eastern Mediterranean. Tarascon and Avignon on the Rhône became important trading ports.

During the 12th century some of the cities of Provence became virtually autonomous. They were ruled by consuls, formally under the Counts of Provence but with considerable autonomy. Consulates existed in Avignon in 1229, 1131 in Arles, between 1140 and 1150 in Tarascon, Nice and Grasse, and 1178 in Marseille. Marseille went farther than the others, establishing a confrerie or charitable and religious organization of the one hundred leaders of the professions, crafts and businesses in the city, which drew up a code of justice and municipal regulations. Several Provençal cities directly negotiated commercial treaties with the republics of Pisa and Genoa in Italy. Other cities, however, such as Aix, Toulon, Hyères, Digne, Cavaillon and Carpentras, remained under the authority of the Counts. In the 13th century the counts of Provence suppressed most of the consulates, but the seeds of civil liberty and democracy had been planted in the cities.

== Cathedrals and monasteries in Provence (12th century) ==
Under the Catalan dynasty, the 12th century saw the construction of important cathedrals and abbeys in Provence, in a harmonious new style, romanesque architecture, which united the Gallo-Roman style of the Rhône Valley with the Lombard style of the Alps. Aix Cathedral was built on the site of the old Roman forum, and then rebuilt in the gothic style in the 13th and 14th centuries. The Church of St. Trophime in Arles was a landmark of Romanesque architecture, built between the 12th and the 15th centuries. A vast fortress-like monastery, Montmajour Abbey, was built on an island just north of Arles, and became a major destination for medieval pilgrims.

In the 12th century three Cistercian monasteries were built in remote parts of Provence, far from the political intrigues of the cities. Sénanque Abbey was the first, established in the Luberon between 1148 and 1178. Le Thoronet Abbey was founded in a remote valley near Draguignan in 1160. Silvacane Abbey, on the Durance at La Roque-d'Anthéron, was founded in 1175.

== Disputes over Provence in the 13th century ==
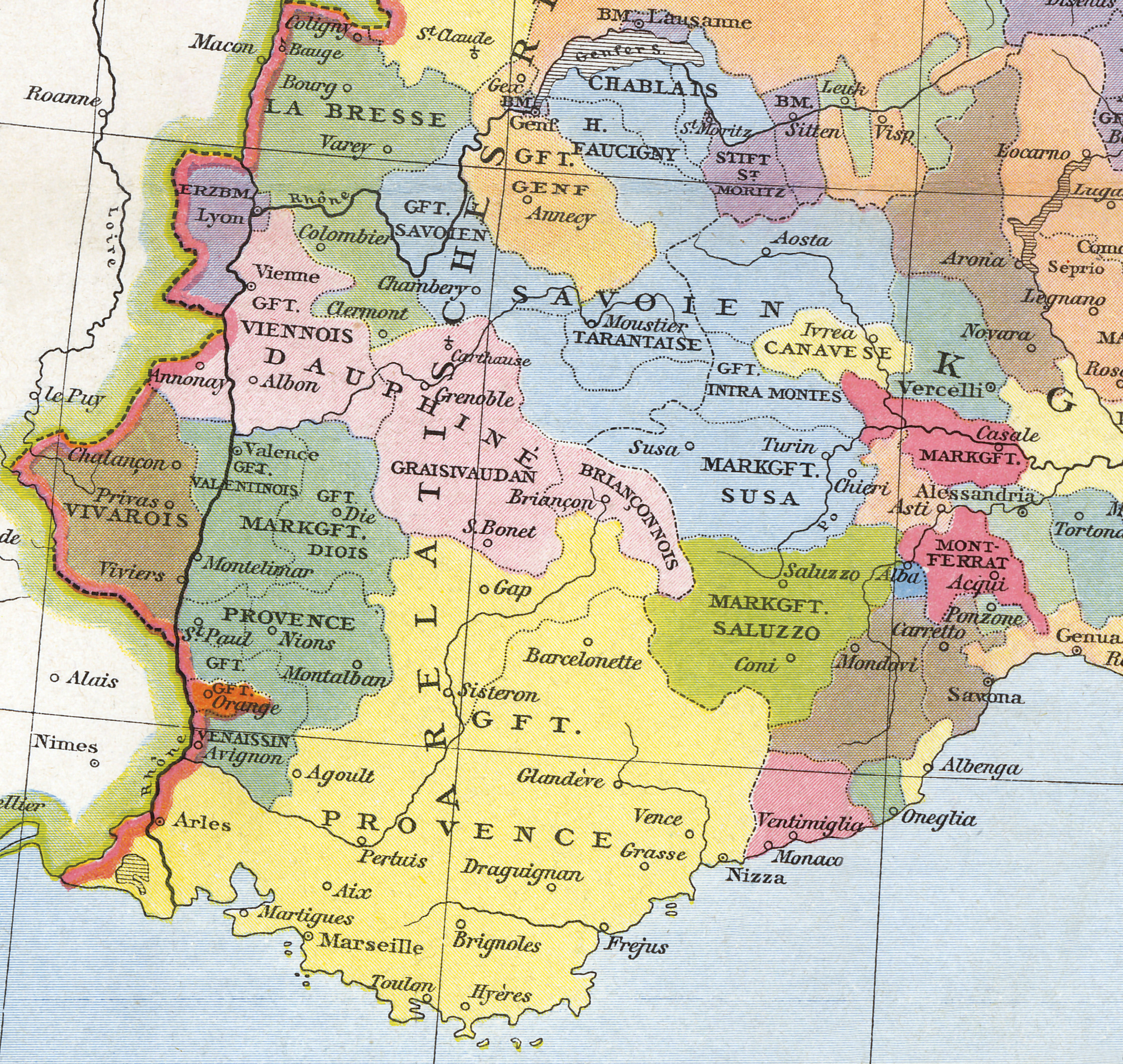
Provence in the middle of the 13th century

In the early 13th century the Albigensian Crusade in neighboring Languedoc upset the existing order in Provence. Pope Innocent III sent missionaries and then soldiers to suppress the Cathar religious movement in Languedoc. The Pope accused Raymond VI, Count of Toulouse of supporting the Cathars, excommunicated him, and invited an army of French knights on a crusade to cleanse the south of France of the heresy. A war began in Provence between the French knights and the soldiers of Raymond VI and his son Raymond VII.

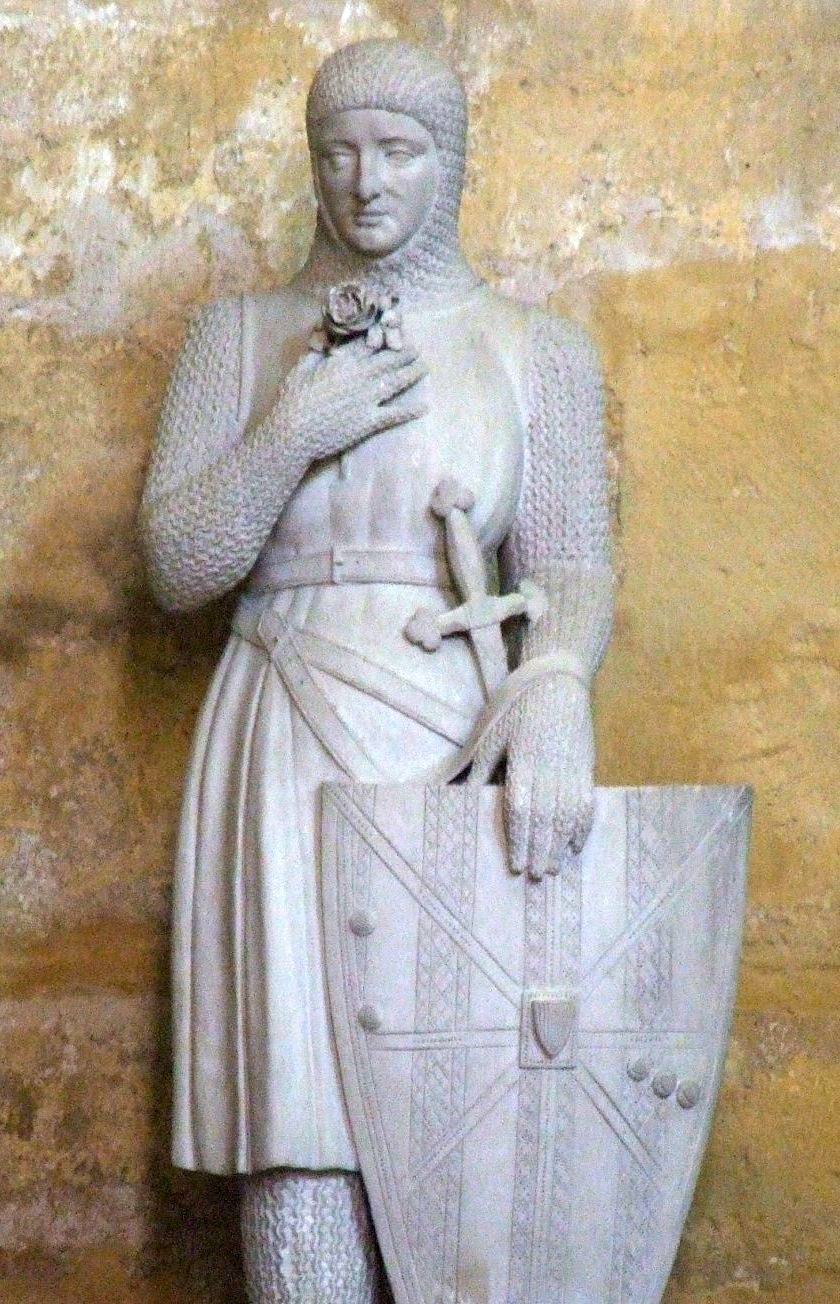
Statue of Ramon Berenguer in Aix Cathedral

Soldiers from Tarascon, Marseille and Avignon joined the army of the Counts of Provence to fight the French. The French commander, Simon de Montfort, was killed at the siege of Toulouse in 1218. Then Raymond VI died in 1222, and a dispute over his lands in Provence began. King Louis VIII of France decided to intervene, and a French royal army marched down the valley of the Rhône and laid siege to Avignon. The city held out for three months but was finally forced by hunger to surrender. Avignon was forced to destroy its city walls and accept a French castle on the other side of the river, and by a treaty signed in Paris on April 12, 1229, the part of Provence west of the Rhône that had belonged to the Counts of Toulouse became part of France.

Beginning in 1220, Provence east of the Rhône had a new ruler, Ramon Berenguer IV, of the Catalan dynasty. He was the first Count of Provence to actually reside in Provence permanently, usually living with his court in Aix. He launched a military campaign to impose his authority over the cities of Provence, ending the independence of Grasse and Tarascon, occupying Nice, which had tried to ally with Genoa; and founding a new town, Barcelonette, in the far east of Provence, near the Italian border.

The ambitions of Ramon Berenguer were energetically resisted by the new Count of Toulouse, Raymond VII, who had lost most of his own territory to France. Raymond VII became an ally of Marseille and Avignon in their fight against Ramon Berenguer. In 1232 his army devastated the territories of Ramon Berenguer around Tarascon and Arles.

Ramon Berenguer responded to this attack by strengthening his alliance with France; he married his daughter, Marguerite, to King Louis IX of France, and appealed to Frederick II, Holy Roman Emperor, for support. In exchange for his support, Frederic demanded that the cities of Arles and Avignon be governed by the Holy Roman Empire. A prolonged struggle took place between Raymond VII and his allies, the cities of Marseille and Avignon, against Ramon Berenguer for authority in Provence. Arles was blockaded and all traffic on the Rhône stopped.

The French army finally intervened to help Ramon Berenguer, the French king's father-in-law. Raymond VII was forced to abandon his quest, and Ramon Berenguer was able to appoint his own candidate as bishop of Avignon and to subdue the rest of eastern Provence. Ramon Berenguer controlled all of Provence between the Rhône and Italian border except the rebellious city of Marseille.

== Provence under the Capetian House of Anjou ==
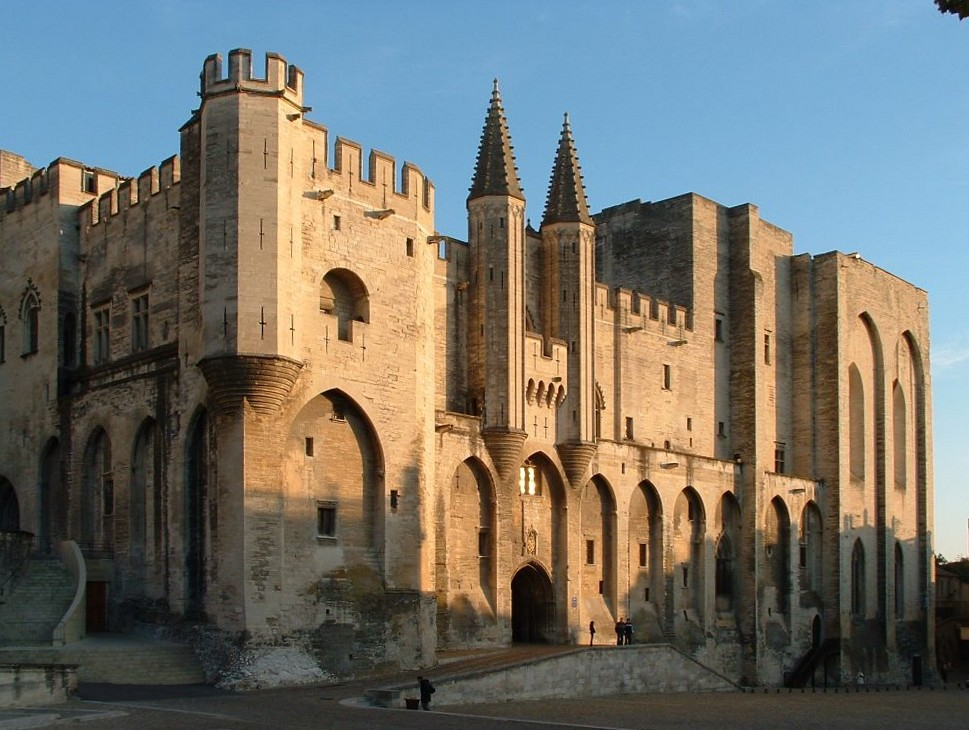
The façade of the Palais des Papes.

Count Ramon Berenguer had four daughters, but no sons. After his death in 1245, his youngest daughter and heiress, Beatrice, married Charles, Count of Anjou, the youngest son of Louis VIII of France, thus bringing Provence to the Capetian House of Anjou.

In 1309, Pope Clement V, who was originally from Bordeaux, moved the Roman Catholic Papacy to Avignon. From 1309 until 1376, seven Popes reigned in Avignon before the Western Schism in 1378 between the Roman and Avignon churches, which led to rival popes in each place. After that three Antipopes reigned in Avignon until 1423, when the Papacy finally returned to Rome. Between 1334 and 1363 Pope Benedict XII built the Papal Palace in Avignon, and Clement VI built the New Palace; together the Palais des Papes was the largest gothic palace in Europe.

The 14th century was a terrible time in Provence, and all of Europe: the population of Provence had been about 400,000 people; the Black Death (1348–1350) killed fifteen thousand people in Arles, half the population of the city, and greatly reduced the population of the whole region. The defeat of the French Army during the Hundred Years' War forced the cities of Provence to build walls and towers to defend themselves against armies of former soldiers who ravaged the countryside.

In the spring of 1365, the emperor Charles IV visited the Kingdom of Burgundy (Arles), and came to Provence, where he was solemnly crowned as king on 4 June at Arles, by cardinal Guillaume de La Garde, the Archbishop of Arles, in the presence of high representatives of various regions, including Provence, thus becoming the last emperor who received the royal crown of the old Arlesian realm.

== Provence under the House of Valois-Anjou ==
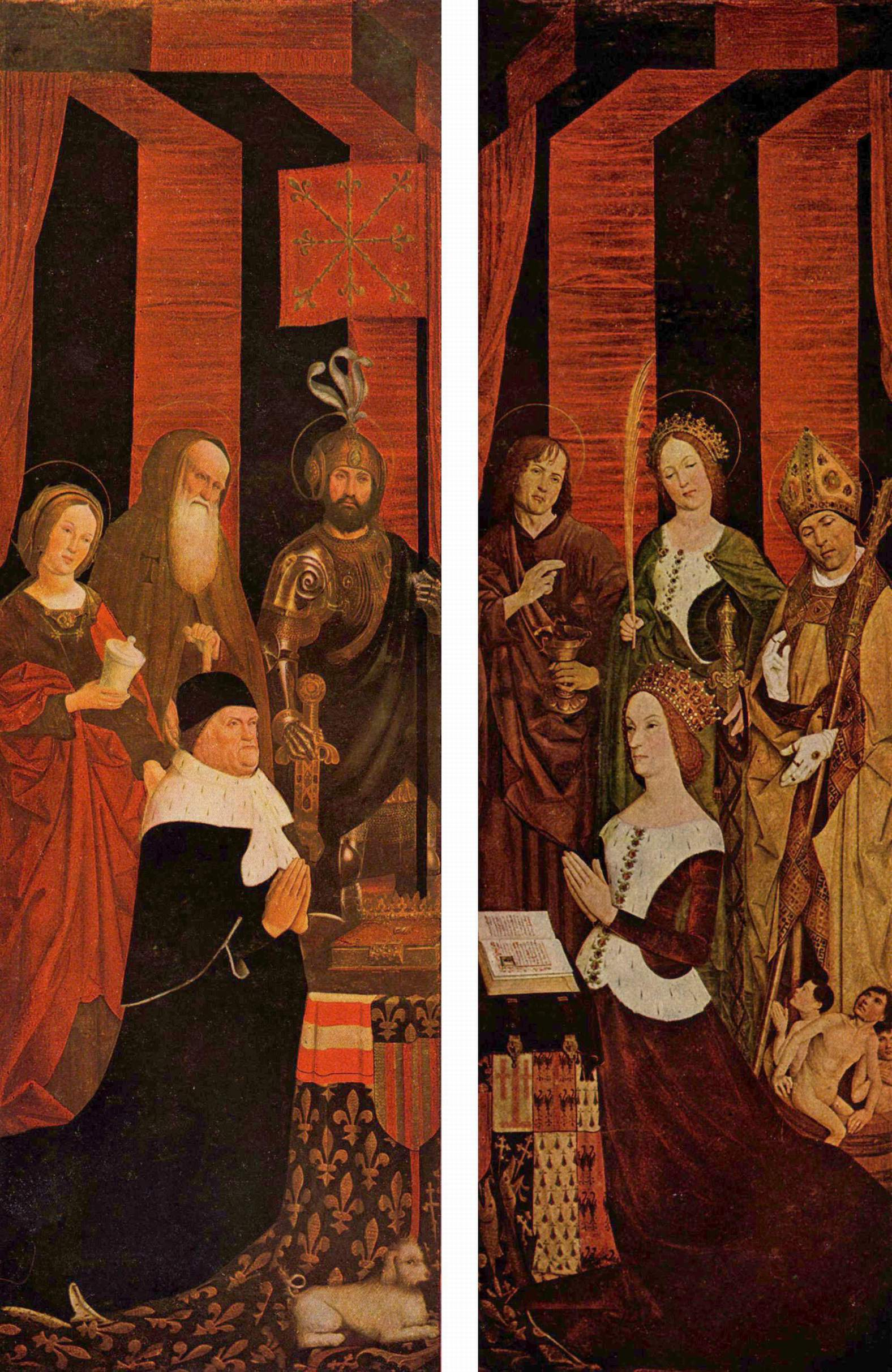
Detail of the Burning Bush triptych by Nicolas Froment, showing René and his wife Jeanne de Laval

In 1380, the ruling countess of Provence, queen Joanna I of Naples, adopted her distant cousin Louis I of Anjou, who was brother of the French king Charles V. When she died in 1392, two pretenders claimed to inherite Provence, Louis from the House of Valois-Anjou, and Charles of Naples, from the cadet branch of the Capetian House of Anjou. Thus, the Union of Aix (1382–1387) was formed, opposing Louis of Anjou. The conflict escalated into a war, leading to the separation of Nice, Puget-Théniers and Barcelonnette from Provence in 1388, and their attachment to the territories of House of Savoy. In time, Louis of Anjou gained control over the rest of Provence and thereby founded the new dynasty, that would rule the region until 1481.

The 15th century saw a series of wars between the Kings of Aragon and the Counts of Provence. In 1423 the army of Alphonse V of Aragon captured Marseille, and in 1443 captured Naples and forced its ruler, King René I of Naples, to flee. He eventually settled in one of his remaining territories, Provence.

History and legend has given René the title "Good King René of Provence", though he only lived in Provence in the last ten years of his life, from 1470 to 1480, and his political policies of territorial expansion were costly and unsuccessful. Provence benefitted from population growth and economic expansion, and René was a generous patron of the arts, sponsoring painters Nicolas Froment, Louis Bréa, and other masters. He also completed one of the finest castles in Provence at Tarascon, on the Rhône.

When René died in 1480, his title passed to his nephew Charles du Maine, who became the new count of Provence. One year later, in 1481, when Charles died, the region passed to king Louis XI of France, as a distinctive domain. Provence was legally united with France in 1486.

== French Provence (1486-1789) ==
Soon after Provence became part of France, it became involved in the Wars of Religion that swept the country in the 16th century. Between 1493 and 1501, many Jews were expelled from their homes and sought sanctuary in the region of Avignon, which was still under the direct rule of the Pope.

In 1524, Provence was invaded during the Italian War of 1521–1526, but commanders of Emperor Charles V failed to capture the region. In 1525, during the peace negotiations between Emperor Charles V and French King Francois I, it was proposed that Provence could be given to Charles III, Duke of Bourbon (d. 1527), but those plans were abandoned and thus not included into the Treaty of Madrid (1526). In 1536, during the Italian War of 1536–1538, Emperor Charles V personally led the invasion of Provence, taking Aix-en-Provence on August 5, and also affirming his rights to the ancient Kingdom of Arles, but those gains were soon lost, and the war ended by the Treaty of Nice (1538), leaving Provence in French possession.

In 1545, the Parlement of Aix-en-Provence ordered the destruction of the villages of Lourmarin, Mérindol and Cabrières-d'Avignon in the Luberon, because their inhabitants were Vaudois of Italian Piedmontese origin, and were not considered sufficiently orthodox Catholics. Most of Provence remained strongly Catholic, with only one enclave of Protestants, the principality of Orange, Vaucluse, an enclave ruled by Prince William the Silent (1533–1584) of the House of Orange-Nassau of the Netherlands, which was created in 1544 and was not incorporated into France until 1673. An army of the Catholic League laid siege to the Protestant city of Ménerbes in the Vaucluse between 1573 and 1578. The wars did not stop until the end of the 16th century, with the consolidation of power in Provence by the House of Bourbon kings.

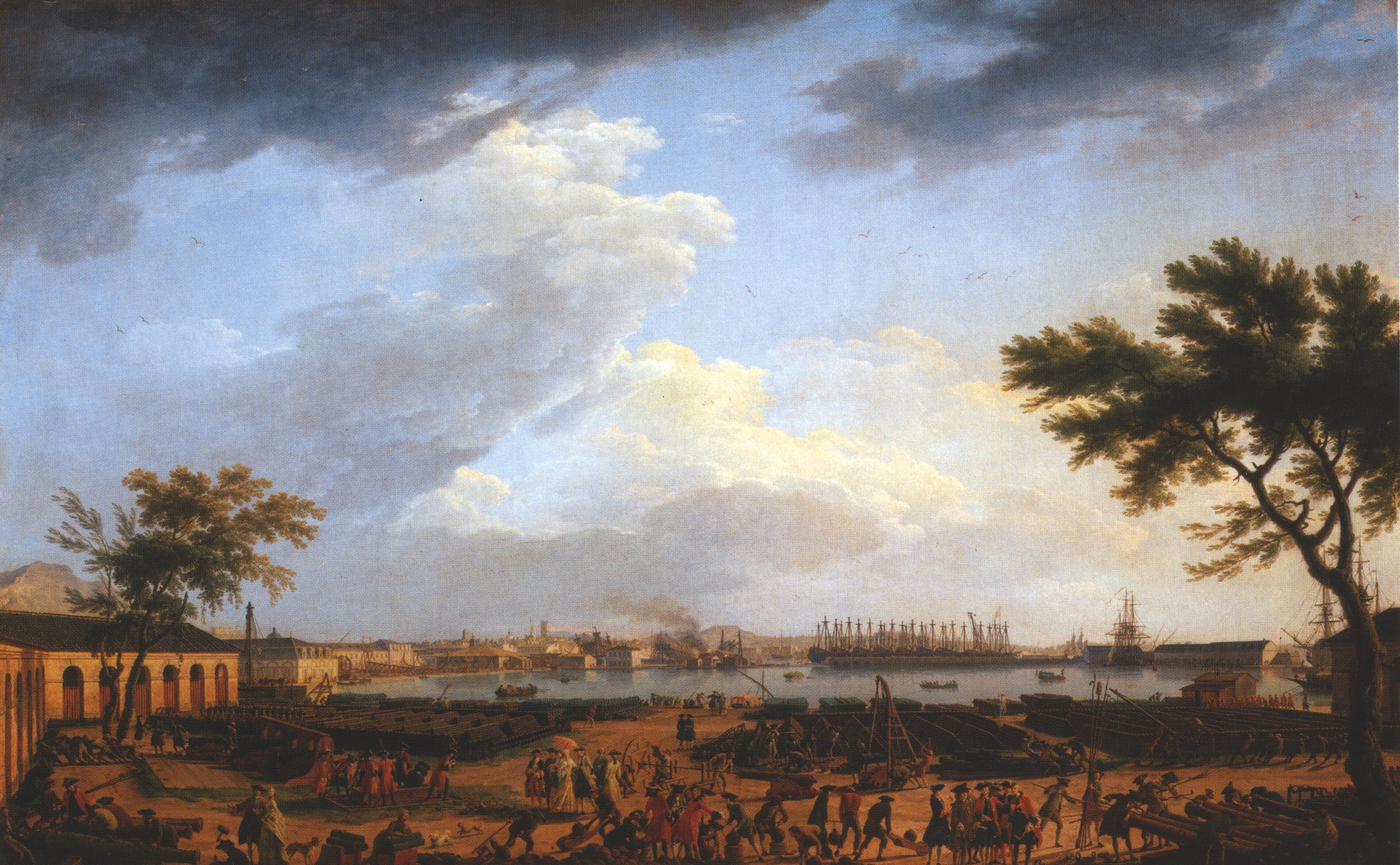
View of Toulon Harbour around 1750, by Joseph Vernet.

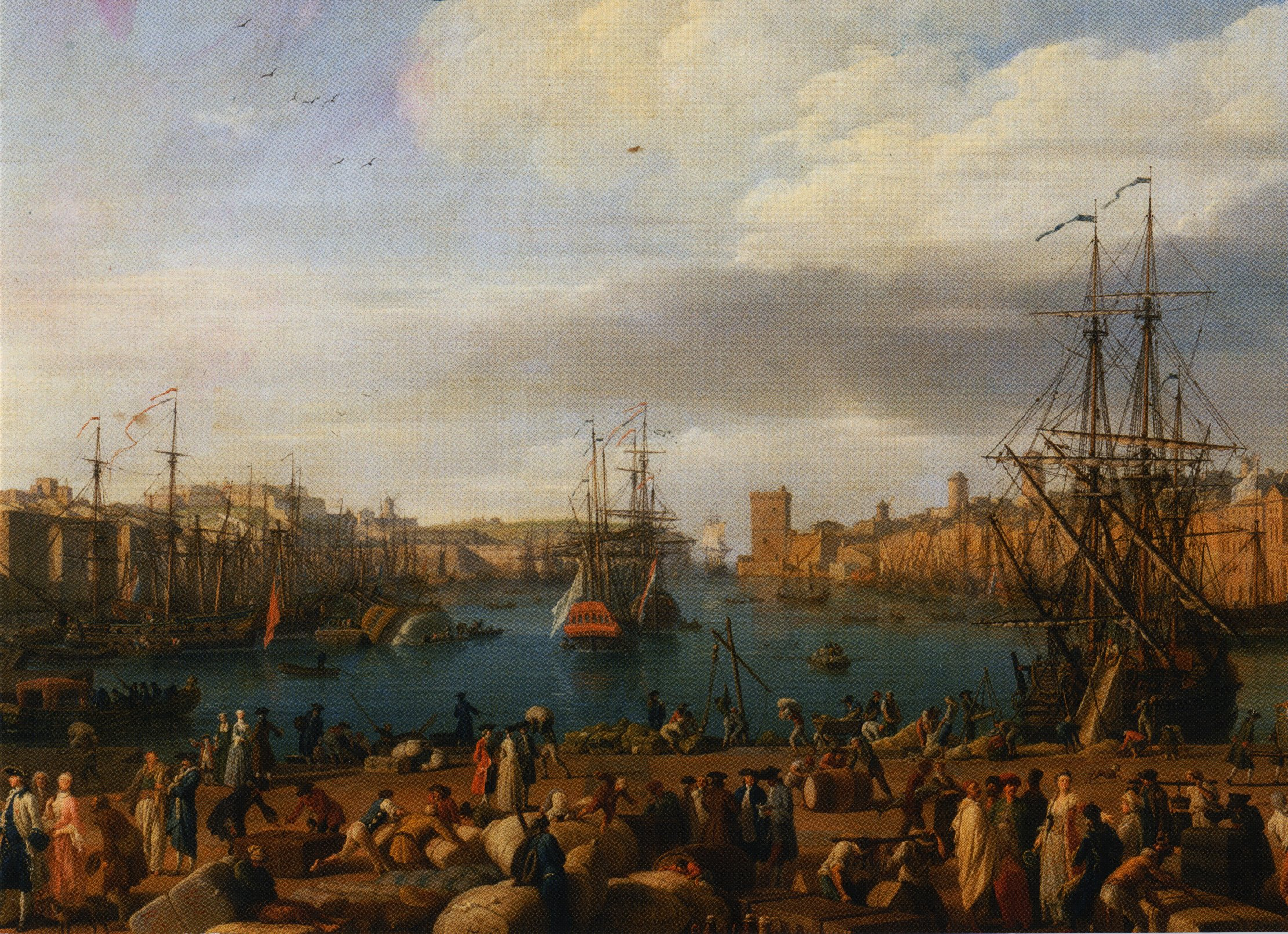
Marseille in 1754, by Vernet

The semi-independent Parlement of Aix-en-Provence and some of the cities of Provence, particularly Marseille, continued to rebel against the authority of the Bourbon king. After uprisings in 1630–31 and 1648–1652, the young King Louis XIV had two large forts, Fort Saint-Jean and Fort St. Nicholas, Marseille, built at the harbor entrance to control the city's unruly population.

At the beginning of the 17th century, Cardinal Richelieu began to build a naval arsenal and dockyard at Toulon to serve as a base for a new French Mediterranean fleet. The base was greatly enlarged by Jean-Baptiste Colbert, the minister of Louis XIV, who commissioned his chief military engineer, Vauban to strengthen the fortifications around the city.

At the beginning of the 17th century, Provence had a population of about 450,000 people. It was predominantly rural, devoted to raising wheat, wine, and olives, with small industries for tanning, pottery, perfume-making, and ship and boat building. Provençal quilts, made from the mid-17th century onwards, were successfully exported to England, Spain, Italy, Germany and the Netherlands. There was considerable commerce along the coast, and up and down the Rhône. The cities of Marseille, Toulon, Avignon and Aix-en-Provence saw the construction of boulevards and richly decorated private houses.

At the beginning of the 18th century Provence suffered from the economic malaise of the end of the reign of Louis XIV. The plague struck the region between 1720 and 1722, beginning in Marseille, killing some 40,000 people. Still, by the end of the century, many artisanal industries began to flourish; making perfumes in Grasse; olive oil in Aix and the Alpilles; textiles in Orange, Avignon and Tarascon; faience pottery in Marseille, Apt, Aubagne, and Moustiers-Sainte-Marie. Many immigrants arrived from Liguria and Piedmont in Italy. By the end of the 18th century, Marseille had a population of 120,000 people, making it the third-largest city in France.

== French Revolution ==
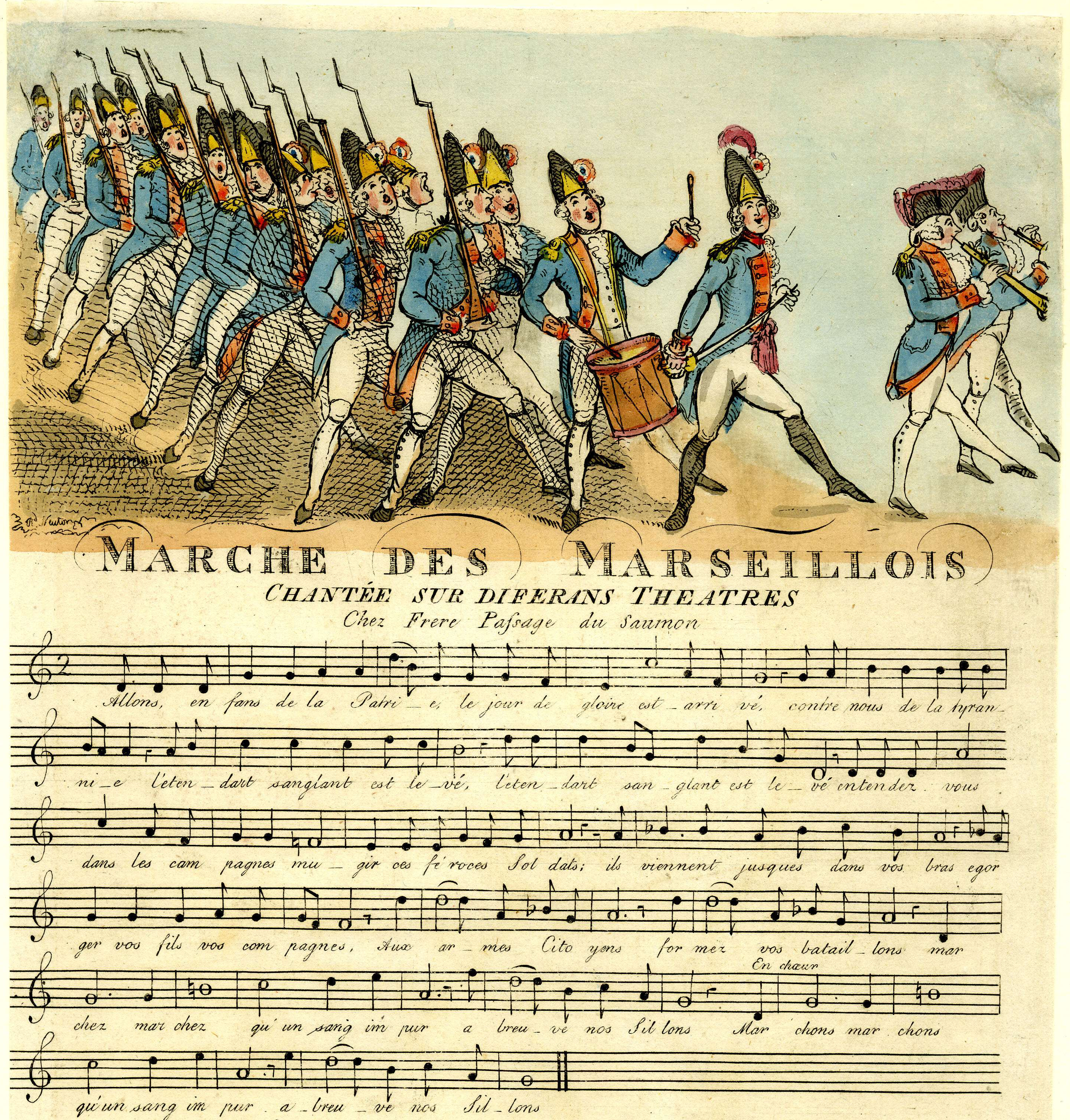
La Marseillaise, 1792

Though most of Provence, with the exception of Marseille, Aix and Avignon, was rural, conservative and largely royalist, it did produce some memorable figures in the French Revolution:

- Honoré Gabriel Riqueti, comte de Mirabeau from Aix, who tried to moderate the Revolution, and turn France into a constitutional monarchy like England;
- Marquis de Sade from Lacoste in the Luberon, who was a delegate to the National Convention;
- Charles Barbaroux from Marseille, who sent a battalion of volunteers to Paris to fight in the French Revolutionary Army;
- Emmanuel-Joseph Sieyès (1748–1836), an abbot, essayist and political leader, who was one of the chief theorists of the French Revolution, French Consulate, and First French Empire, and who, in 1799, was the instigator of the coup d'état of 18 Brumaire, which brought Napoleon Bonaparte to power.

Provence also produced the most memorable song of the period, La Marseillaise. The song was originally written by a citizen of Strasbourg, Claude Joseph Rouget de Lisle in 1792. It was originally a war song for the revolutionary Army of the Rhine. It became famous when sung on the streets of Paris by the volunteers from Marseille, who had heard it in Marseille sung by a young volunteer from Montpellier named François Mireur. It became the most popular song of the French Revolution and in 1879 became the national anthem of France.

The French Revolution was as violent and bloody in Provence as it was in other parts of France. On April 30, 1790, Fort Saint-Nicolas in Marseille was besieged, and many of the soldiers inside were massacred. On October 17, 1791, a massacre of royalists and religious figures took place in the ice storage rooms (glaciere) of the prison of the Palace of the Popes in Avignon.

When the radical Montagnards seized power from the Girondins in May 1793, Federalist revolts erupted in Marseille and Toulon. A revolutionary army under Jean François Carteaux recaptured Marseille in August 1793 and renamed it "City without a Name" (Ville sans Nom). In Toulon, the opponents of the Revolution handed the city to a British and Spanish fleet on August 28, 1793. A Revolutionary Army laid siege to the British positions for four months, and finally, thanks to the enterprise of the young commander of artillery, Napoleon Bonaparte, defeated the British and drove them out in December, 1793. About 15,000 royalists escaped with the British fleet, but five to eight hundred of the 7,000 who remained were shot on the Champ de Mars, and Toulon was renamed "Port la Montagne".

The fall of the Montagnards in July 1794 was followed by a new White Terror aimed at the revolutionaries. Calm was only restored by the rise of Napoleon to power in 1795.

== Provence under Napoleon I ==
Napoleon restored the property and power of the families of the Ancien Régime in Provence. The British fleet of Admiral Horatio Nelson blockaded Toulon, and almost all maritime commerce was stopped, causing hardship and poverty. When Napoleon was defeated, his fall was celebrated in Provence. When he escaped from Elba on March 1, 1815, and landed at Golfe-Juan, he detoured to avoid the cities of Provence, which were hostile to him.

== Provence in the 19th century ==
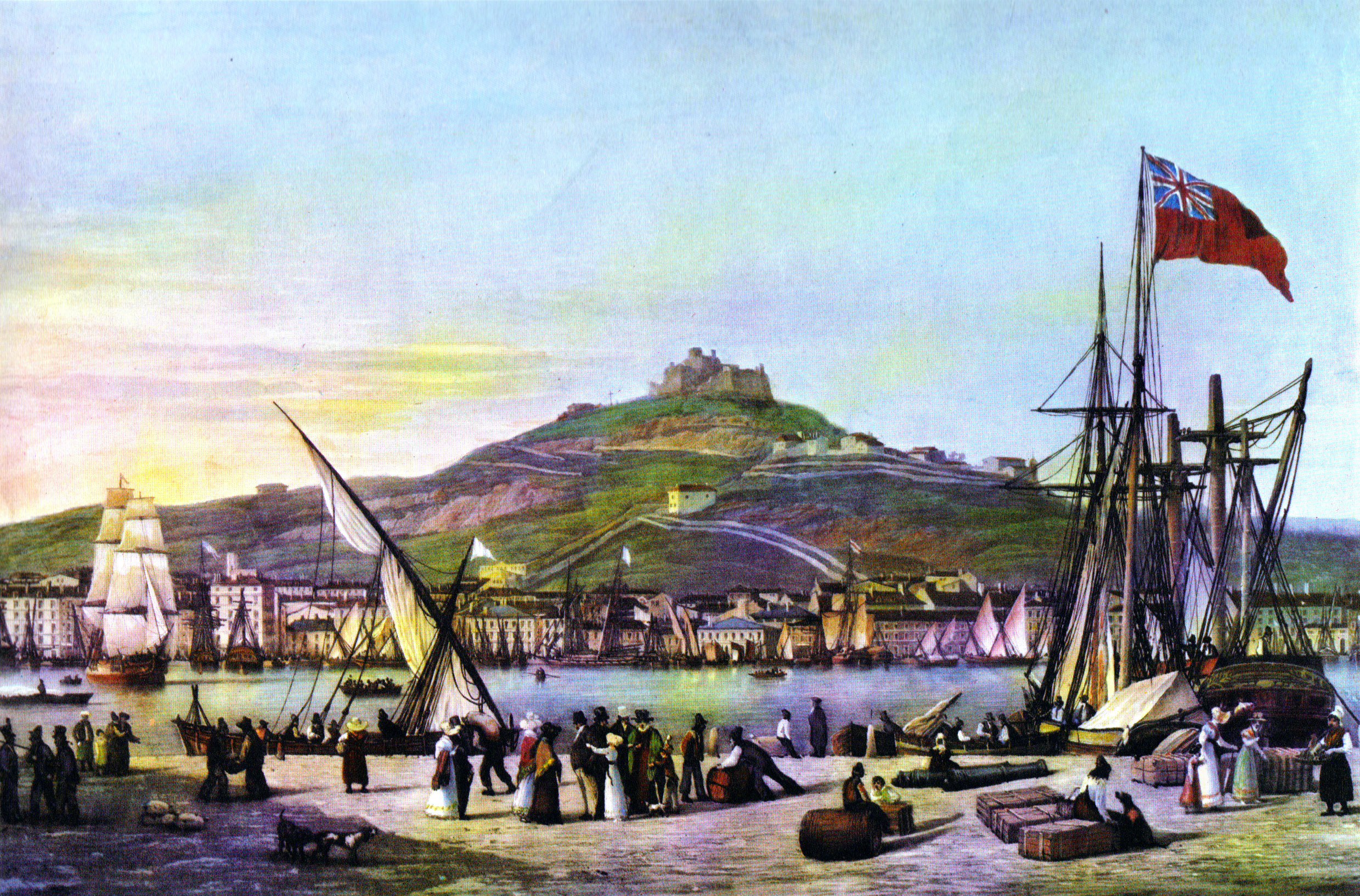
Marseille in 1825

Provence enjoyed prosperity in the 19th century; the ports of Marseille and Toulon connected Provence with the expanding French Empire in North Africa and the Orient, especially after the opening of the Suez Canal in 1869.

In April–July 1859, Napoleon III made a secret agreement with the Count of Cavour, Prime Minister of Piedmont, for France to assist in expelling Austria from the Italian peninsula and bringing about a united Italy, in exchange for Piedmont ceding Savoy and the Nice region to France. He went to war with Austria in 1859 and won a victory at Solferino, which resulted in Austria ceding Lombardy to Piedmont, and, in return, Napoleon received Savoy and Nice in 1860, and Roquebrune and Menton in 1861. In that way Nice and its territory returned to Provence after nearly 500 years of schism.

The railroad connected Paris with Marseille in 1848 and then with Toulon and Nice in 1864. Nice, Antibes and Hyères became popular winter resorts for European royalty, including Queen Victoria. Under Napoleon III, Marseille grew to a population of 250,000, including a very large Italian community. Toulon had a population of 80,000. Large cities like Marseille and Toulon saw construction of churches, opera houses, grand boulevards, and parks.

After the fall of Louis Napoleon following his defeat in the Franco-German War barricades went up in the streets of Marseille on March 23, 1871, and the Communards, led by Gaston Cremieux and following the lead of the Paris Commune, took control of the city. The Commune was crushed by the army and Cremieux was executed on November 30, 1871. Though Provence was generally conservative, it often elected reformist leaders; Prime Minister Léon Gambetta was the son of a Marseille grocer, and future prime minister Georges Clemenceau was elected deputy from the Var in 1885.

The second half of the 19th century saw a revival of the Provençal language and culture, particularly traditional rural values, driven by a movement of writers and poets called the Félibrige, led by poet Frédéric Mistral. Mistral achieved literary success with his work Mirèio (Mireille in French); he was awarded the Nobel Prize for literature in 1904.

== Provence in the 20th century ==
Between World War I and World War II Provence was bitterly divided between the more conservative rural areas and the more radical big cities. There were widespread strikes in Marseille in 1919, and riots in Toulon in 1935.

After the defeat of France by Germany in June 1940, France was divided into an occupied zone and unoccupied zone, with Provence in the unoccupied zone. Parts of eastern Provence were occupied by Italian soldiers. Collaboration and passive resistance gradually gave way to more active resistance, particularly after Nazi Germany invaded the Soviet Union in June 1941 and the Communist Party became active in the French Resistance. Jean Moulin, the deputy of Charles de Gaulle, the leader of the Free France resistance movement, parachuted into Eygalières in the Bouches-du-Rhône on January 2, 1942, to unite the diverse resistance movements in all of France against the Germans.

In November 1942, following Allied landings in North Africa (Operation Torch), the Germans occupied all of Provence (Operation Attila) and then headed for Toulon (Case Anton). The French fleet at Toulon sabotaged its own ships to keep them from falling into German hands.

The Germans began a systematic rounding-up of French Jews and refugees from Nice and Marseille. Many thousands were taken to concentration camps, and few survived. A large quarter around the port of Marseille was emptied of inhabitants and dynamited, so it would not serve as a base for the resistance. Nonetheless, the resistance grew stronger; the leader of the pro-German militia in Marseille, the Milice, was assassinated in April 1943.

On August 15, 1944, two months after the Allied landings in Normandy (Operation Overlord), the Seventh United States Army under General Alexander M. Patch, with a Free French corps under General Jean de Lattre de Tassigny, landed on the coast of the Var between St. Raphael and Cavalaire (Operation Dragoon). The American forces moved north toward Manosque, Sisteron and Gap, while the French First Armored Division under General Jean Touzet du Vigier liberated Brignoles, Salon, Arles, and Avignon. The Germans in Toulon resisted until August 27, and Marseille was not liberated until August 25.

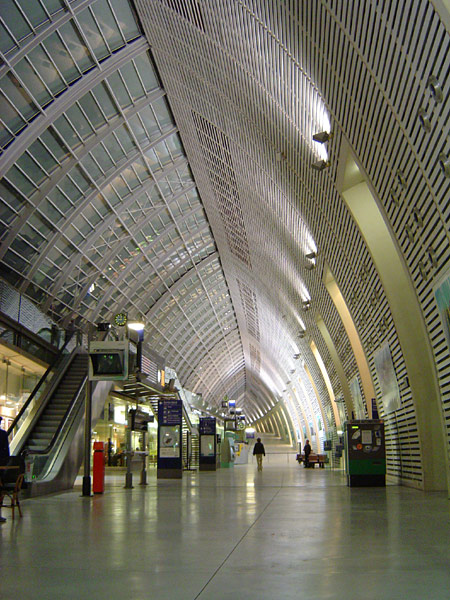
Avignon TGV station, 2001

After the end of the war, Provence faced an enormous task of repair and reconstruction, particularly of the ports and railroads destroyed during the war. As part of this effort, the first modern concrete apartment block, the Unité d'Habitation of Corbusier, was built in Marseille in 1947–52. In 1962, Provence absorbed a large number of French citizens who had left Algeria after its independence. Since that time, large North African communities have settled in and around the big cities, particularly Marseille and Toulon.

In the 1940s, Provence underwent a cultural renewal, with the founding of the Avignon Festival of theatre (1947), the reopening of the Cannes Film Festival (begun in 1939), and many other major events. With the building of new highways, particularly the Paris-Marseille autoroute which opened in 1970, Provence became a destination for mass tourism from all over Europe. Many Europeans, particularly from Britain, bought summer houses in Provence. The arrival of the TGV high-speed trains shortened the trip from Paris to Marseille to less than four hours.

At the end of the 20th century and the beginning of the 21st century, the residents of Provence were struggling to reconcile economic development and population growth with their desire to preserve the landscape and culture that make Provence unique.

== See also ==
- Timeline of Provence

Cities in Provence

- Timeline of Aix-en-Provence
- Timeline of Marseille
- Timeline of Toulon
- Castellane

== Bibliography ==
=== General histories of Provence ===
- Edouard Baratier (editor), Histoire de la Provence, Editions Privat, Toulouse, 1990 (ISBN 2-7089-1649-1)
- Aldo Bastié, Histoire de la Provence, Editions Ouest-France, 2001.
- Martin Garrett, 'Provence: a Cultural History' (2006)
- James Pope-Hennessy, Aspects of Provence (1988)
- Denizeau, Gerard, Histoire Visuelle des Monuments de France, Larousse, 2003

=== Prehistoric, Celto-Ligurian, Greek and Roman Provence ===
- Henry de Lumley, La Grand Histoire des premiers hommes europeens, Odile Jacob, 2007. (ISBN 978-2-7831-2386-2)
- Musée d'histoire de Marseille, L'Antiquité (Catalog of the antiquities collection of the Museum of the History of Marseille.) Imprimerie Municipale of Marseille, 1988.
- Celine Le Prioux and Hervé Champollion, La Provence Antique, Editions Ouest-France, Rennes, (ISBN 2-7373-1431-3)
- Anne Roth Congès, De l'oppidum salyen à la cité latine, Editions du Patrimoine, Centre des Monuments Nationaux, 2010 (ISBN 978-2-7577-0079-2)

=== Romanesque and Medieval Provence ===
- Aldo Bastié and Hervé, Les Chemins de la Provence Romane, Editions Ouest-France, (ISBN 2-7373-1430-5)

=== Provence before the French Revolution ===
- Michel Vergé-Franceschi, Toulon – Port Royal (1481–1789). Tallandier: Paris, 2002.
- Cyrille Roumagnac, L'Arsenal de Toulon et la Royale, Editions Alan Sutton, 2001

=== Provence in the 19th and 20th centuries ===
- Prosper Mérimée, Notes de voyages, ed. Pierre-Marie Auzas (1971)
- LeMoine, Bertrand, Guide d'architecture, France, 20e siecle, Picard, Paris 2000
- Jim Ring, Riviera, The Rise and Fall of the Côte d'Azur, John Murray Publishers, London 2004.

== Sources ==
- Bouchard, Constance B. (1999). "Burgundy and Provence, 879–1032". The New Cambridge Medieval History. Vol. 3. Cambridge: Cambridge University Press. pp. 328–345. ISBN 978-0-521-36447-8.
- Cox, Eugene L. (1967). The Green Count of Savoy: Amedeus VI and Transalpine Savoy in the Fourteenth-Century. Princeton: Princeton University Press. ISBN 978-1-4008-7499-6.
- Kibler, William W.; Zinn, Grover A., eds. (2011) [1995]. Medieval France: An Encyclopedia. New York and London: Routledge. ISBN 978-1-351-66566-7.
- McKitterick, Rosamond (1983). The Frankish Kingdoms Under the Carolingians, 751-987. Harlow: Longman. ISBN 978-0-582-49005-5.
- Parker, Geoffrey (2019). Emperor: A New Life of Charles V. New Haven and London: Yale University Press. ISBN 978-0-300-19652-8.
- Potter, David L. (1995). A History of France, 1460–1560: The Emergence of a Nation. Basingstoke: Macmillan. ISBN 978-0-333-54123-4.
- Wilson, Peter (2016). Heart of Europe: A History of the Holy Roman Empire. Cambridge: Harvard University Press. ISBN 978-0-674-91592-3.
