= Charles of Anjou (disambiguation) =

Charles of Anjou (count, 1246–1285) was King of Sicily from 1266 to 1285.

Charles of Anjou may also refer to:

- Charles II of Anjou (count, 1285–1290), also king of Naples
- Charles III of Anjou (count, 1290–1325), also count of Valois
- Charles IV of Anjou (duke, 1480–1481), also count of Provence

== See also ==
- Count of Anjou
- Duke of Anjou
