= Charles IV of Anjou =

French noble

Coat of arms of duke Charles IV of Anjou

Charles IV of Anjou (1446 – 10 December 1481), was a French nobleman from the House of Valois-Anjou. He held several feudal domains, both in the Kingdom of France and the Holy Roman Empire. He was Count of Maine, Guise, Mortain and Gien since 1472, and also Duke of Anjou and Count of Provence and Forcalquier since 1480.

== Biography ==
Charles was son of count Charles of Maine and Isabelle of Luxembourg-Saint-Pol. He succeeded his father as Count of Maine, Guise, Mortain and Gien in 1472. In 1480, he succeeded his paternal uncle René the Good as Duke of Anjou and Count of Provence and Forcalquier, according to the will of René, who had no surviving sons, while René's surviving daughter Yolande received the County of Bar, and was already Duchess of Lorraine.

Charles also used the title of Duke of Calabria, in token of the claims to the throne of the Kingdom of Naples he also inherited from René.

In 1474, Charles married Joan of Lorraine (1458 – 25 January 1480), daughter of Frederick II of Vaudémont, but they had no children. He died on 10 December 1481.

He willed his domains to his cousin, king Louis XI of France, who thus received the Duchy of Anjou as a reverted royal fief, while the rule over the counties of Provence and Forcalquier, that formally belonged to the Kingdom of Arles within the Holy Roman Empire, was regulated through a series of settlements, but without direct incorporation into the French realm. As Charles' inheritor, king Louis XI also obtained a claim to the throne of Naples, pursued by his heirs during the next decades, thus leading to the Italian Wars.

== See also ==
- Counts of Maine
- Counts of Guise
- Count of Mortain
- Dukes of Anjou
- Counts of Provence
- History of Provence

== Sources ==
- Duboscq, Guy (1935). "Couverture fascicule Le mariage de Charles d'Anjou, comte du Maine, et le comté de Guise (1431-1473)". Bibliothèque de l'École des chartes. 96: 338–366.
- Grierson, Philip; Travaini, Lucia (1998). Medieval European Coinage: Volume 14, South Italy, Sicily, Sardinia. Cambridge University Press.
- Kibler, William W.; Zinn, Grover A., eds. (2011) [1995]. Medieval France: An Encyclopedia. New York and London: Routledge.
- Mallett, Michael; Shaw, Christine (2014) [2012]. The Italian Wars 1494-1559: War, State and Society in Early Modern Europe. London and New York: Routledge.
- Potter, David L. (1995). A History of France, 1460–1560: The Emergence of a Nation. Basingstoke: Macmillan.
- Saenger, Paul (1977). "Burgundy and the Inalienability of Appanages in the Reign of Louis XI". French Historical Studies. 10 (1): 1–26.

| Preceded by René I | Duke of Anjou; Count of Provence and Forcalquier; 1480–1481 | Crown lands of France |
| Preceded by Charles of Le Maine | Count of Maine, Guise, Mortain and Gien; 1472–1481 | Crown lands of France |
