= Incorporation of Provence into France =

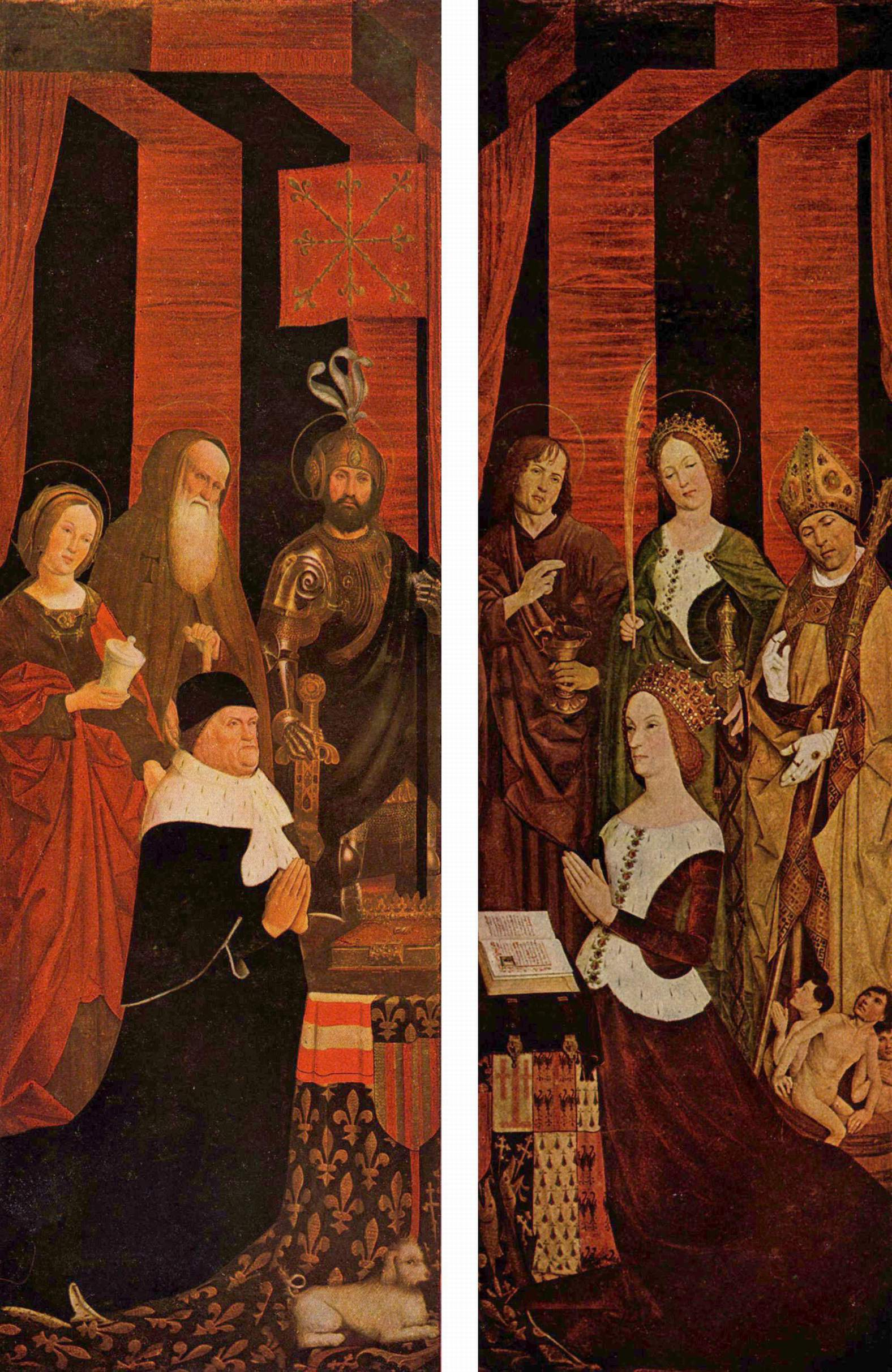
Detail of the Burning Bush triptych by Nicolas Froment, showing René and his wife Jeanne de Laval

The incorporation of Provence into France happened in 1486 after the death in 1481 of Charles IV of Anjou who passed the County of Provence to his cousin Louis XI.

King René of Anjou died on July 10, 1480. He had disinherited his natural successor René II of Lorraine in favor of Charles of Anjou who received the homage of Provence and became Count Charles III. Having no children, the latter bequeathed his State to Louis XI and his successors.

On Charles's death in December 1481, Provence passed to Charles's cousin, Louis XI, King of France. The Estates of Provence on January 15, 1482, approved a document with 53 articles, informally called the "Provençal constitution", which made Louis XI the Count of Provence and proclaimed the union of France and Provence "as one principal to another principal".

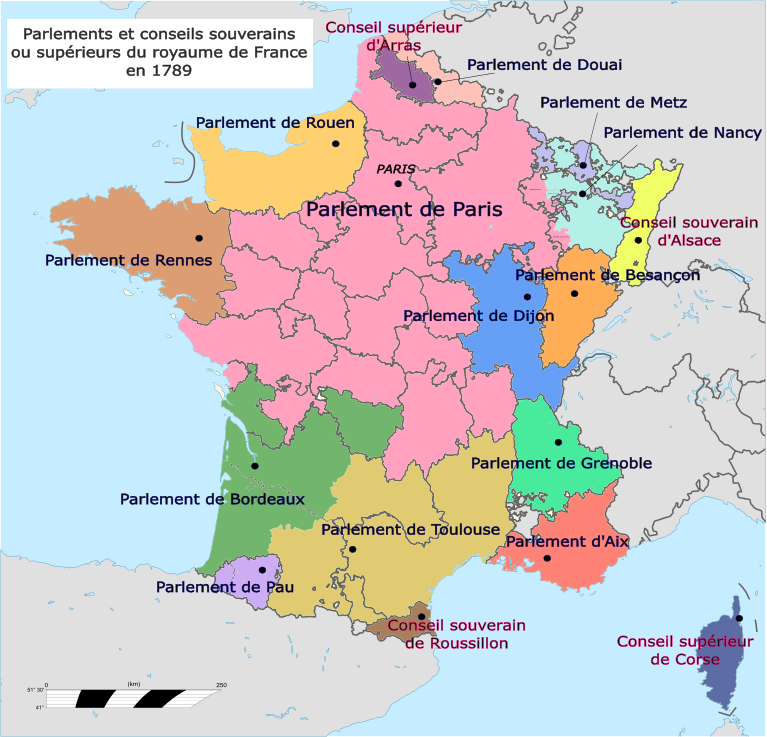
Territories assigned to the Parlements and Sovereign Councils of the Kingdom of France in 1789

Charles VIII succeeded Louis XI in 1483 and, in 1486, the Estates of Provence asked him for perpetual union, granted by Charles as King of France through letters patent drawn up in October 1486 and communicated to the Estates in April 1487, "without being in any way subordinate to this crown or to the kingdom". Although Provence retained specific rights, it was governed and organized as a French province with a Parlement of Provence created in 1501, while benefiting from a certain degree of autonomy, jealously defended, particularly in tax matters.
