= Kingdom of Arles =

Constituent kingdom of the Holy Roman Empire (933 – 15th century)

Coordinates: 43.68°N 4.65°E

Kingdom of Burgundy Regnum Burgundiae (Latin) Kingdom of Arles Regnum Arelatense (Latin)
- 933 – 15th century
- The Kingdom of Burgundy within Europe at the beginning of the 11th century

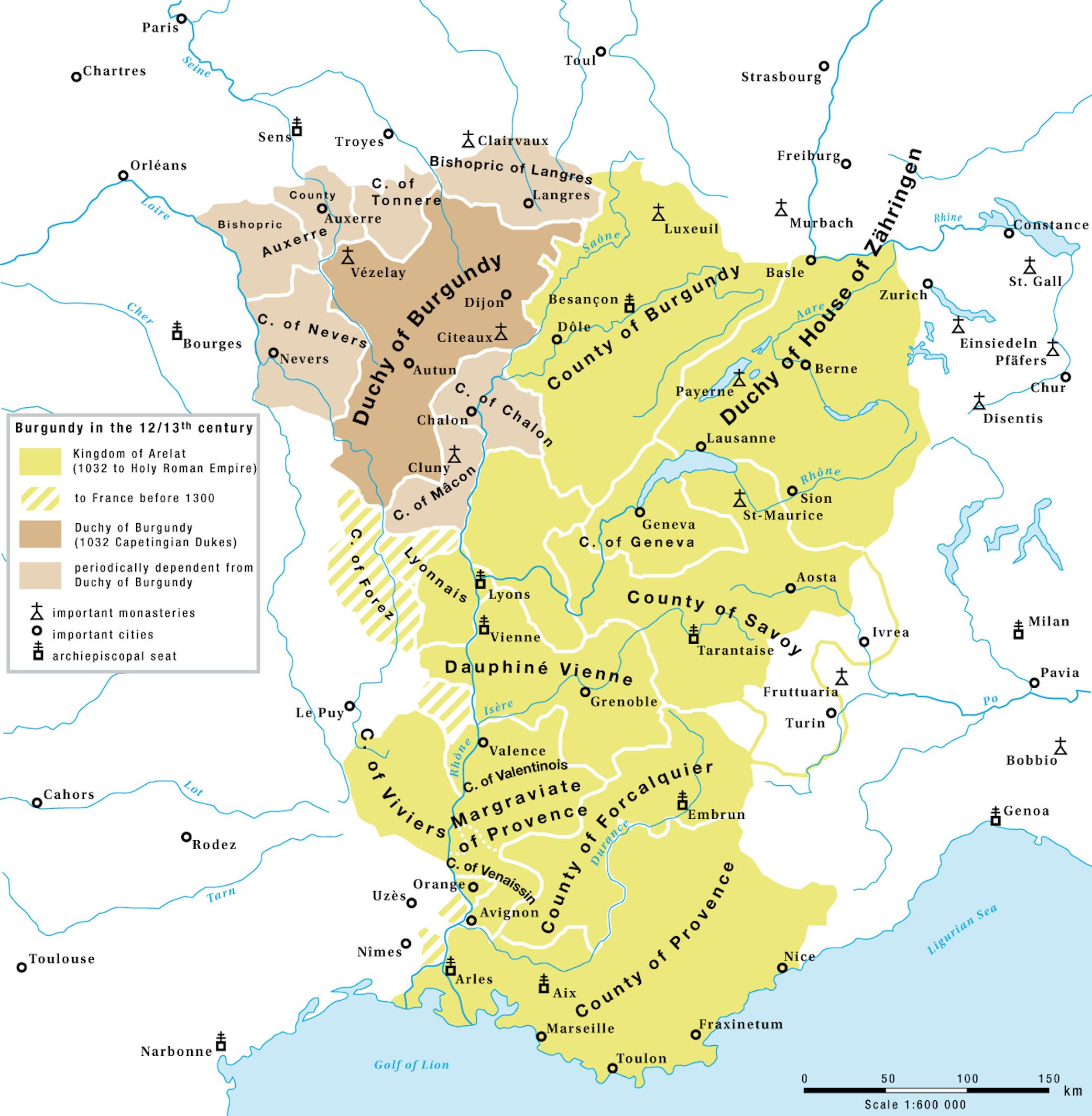
- Burgundy in the 12th–13th century: Kingdom of Arles French Duchy of Burgundy Ducal dependencies
- Status: Sovereign kingdom (933–1032); Imperial kingdom of the Holy Roman Empire (1032 – 15th century)
- Capital: Arles
- Government: Monarchy
- King
  - 912–937 (first): Rudolph II
  - 1410–1437 (last): Sigismund
- Historical era: High Middle Ages
  - Union of Upper and Lower kingdoms: 933
  - Rudolph III pledged succession to King Henry II of Germany: May 1006
  - Rudolph III died without issue; kingdom inherited by Emperor Conrad II: 6 September 1032
  - Emperor Charles IV detached the County of Savoy and incorporated it into the Kingdom of Germany: 1361
  - Dauphin Charles made Imperial Vicar of Burgundy: 7 January 1378
  - Disestablished: 15th century
  - Archbishop of Trier removed as archchancellor: 27 April 1803
Preceded by
Upper Burgundy
Lower Burgundy
Succeeded by
County of Burgundy
Comtat Venaissin
Principality of Orange
County of Savoy
Landgraviate of Burgundy
Dauphiné
County of Provence
- Today part of: France; Italy; Switzerland

The Kingdom of Burgundy, also known as the Kingdom of Arles, was a realm established in 933 by the unification of Lower Burgundy with the Upper Burgundy. As an independent kingdom, it was ruled by monarchs from the Elder House of Welf until 1032, when it was incorporated into the Holy Roman Empire, becoming one of the empire's three constituent realms, together with the Kingdom of Germany and the Kingdom of Italy. By the 13th century it went through the process of feudal fragmentation, and since the 14th century the imperial rule over the kingdom became mainly nominal, weakening further during the 15th century.

Its territory stretched from the Mediterranean Sea in the south to the High Rhine in the north, and from the Western Alps in the east to the Rhône basin in the west, thus encompassing almost all of the historical Burgundian lands, and roughly corresponding to the present-day French regions of Provence-Alpes-Côte d'Azur, Rhône-Alpes and Franche-Comté, as well as the region of Romandy in western Switzerland, and the Aosta Valley in Italy.

== Name ==
As an independent state (933–1032), the realm was known as the Kingdom of Burgundy, keeping the same name within the Holy Roman Empire, but also becoming known as the Kingdom of Arles, in reference to its capital city of Arles. Thus in sources, as well in historiography, it is referred to in various contexts as the Second Kingdom of Burgundy in order to distinguish the realm created in 933 from the First Kingdom of Burgundy (411–534), while the term Kingdom of Arles (also Arelat, or Kingdom of Arles and Vienne) is commonly used for the later period, after 1032.

== Post-Carolingian kingdoms in Burgundy ==
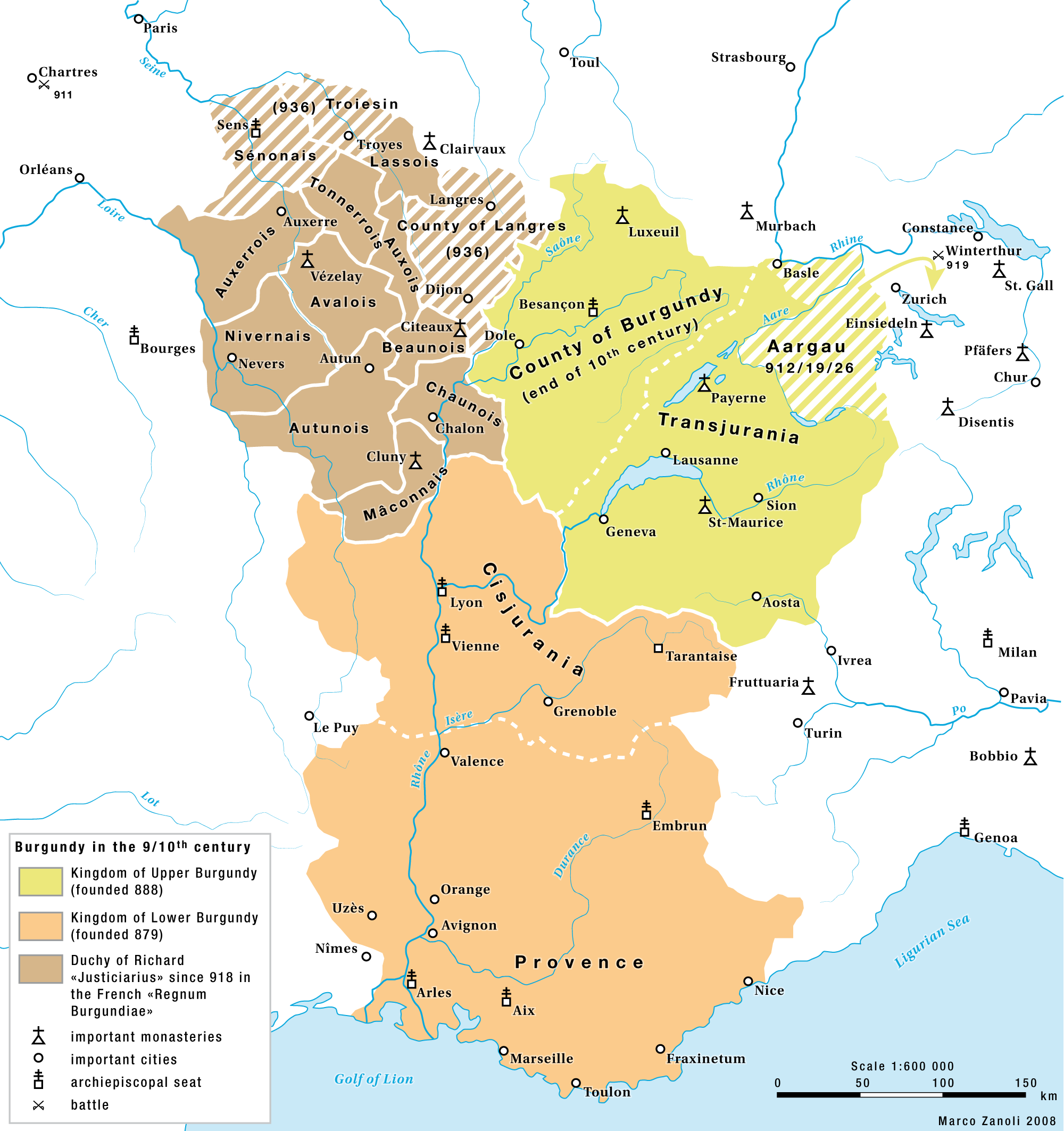
The three Burgundian polities, c. 900: Upper Burgundy Lower Burgundy Duchy of Burgundy under Richard the Justiciar

Since the middle of the 9th century, the Carolingian Empire went through a series of crises and divisions. In 843, by the Treaty of Verdun, the Empire was divided in three parts, with much of Burgundian lands becoming part of Middle Francia, which was allotted to emperor Lothair I (Lotharii Regnum), while the north-western Burgundian regions (later Duchy of Burgundy, the present-day Bourgogne), went to Charles the Bald, king of West Francia. King Louis the German received East Francia, comprising the territory east of the river Rhine.

In 855, by the Treaty of Prüm, Middle Francia was divided, allotting Upper Burgundy to Lothair's second son Lothair II (d. 869), and also designating Lower Burgundy with Provence to Lothair's younger son Charles the Young (d. 863). Upon the death of Charles in 863, his domains were divided between his brothers: emperor Louis II took Provence, while Lothair II received the rest. In 869, Lothair II died without legitimate children, and in 870 his uncles Charles the Bald and Louis the German concluded the Treaty of Meerssen and partitioned his territory: much of the Upper Burgundy, the territory around of the Jura Mountains, went to Louis the German. The western regions went to Charles the Bald, while emperor Louis II kept Provence and parts of Lower Burgundy. In 875, the emperor died, and his domains in Lower Burgundy and Provence were taken by Charles the Bald and incorporated into his domains.

In the confusion after the death of Charles' son, the West Frankish king Louis the Stammerer in 879, one of his most powerful nobles, count Boso of Provence (d. 887) refused to submit to Louis' heirs. At the Synod of Mantaille, Boso was proclaimed king, thus establishing a distinctive kingdom in the regions of Lower Burgundy and Provence, centered at Vienne and Arles, but his realm was much reduced by 882. His son and heir, king Louis the Blind (d. 928) succeeded to restore and consolidate the realm in 890, and even managed to capture northern Italy, becoming the emperor in 901. Blinded in 905, he gradually transferred the governance to his cousin, count Hugh of Arles.

In the meanwhile, a separate kingdom was created in Upper Burgundy. In 888, upon the death of the Emperor Charles the Fat, count Rudolph, from the Elder House of Welf, founded the Kingdom of Upper Burgundy, centered at Saint-Maurice which included the Upper-Burgundian lands on both sides of the Jura Mountains. In 912, he was succeeded in Upper Burgundy by his son Rudolph II.

== Welfish Kingdom of Burgundy ==
In 933, king Hugh of Italy ceded Lower Burgundy to king Rudolph II of Upper Burgundy in return for Rudolph relinquishing his claim to the Italian throne. Rudolph merged both Upper and Lower Burgundy to form the united Kingdom of Burgundy, stretching from the Jura Mountains to the coasts of Provence.

In 937, Rudolph was succeeded by his son, king Conrad the Peaceful. Inheritance claims by king Hugh of Italy were rejected, with the support of emperor Otto I. The kingdom was simultaneously invaded by Magyar and Arab raiding parties in 954. Conrad sent envoys to both parties to attack one another, and also sent expeditions to Provence in raiding Arab settlements in the 960s.

In 993, Conrad was succeeded by his son, king Rudolph III, who had no heirs, and thus in 1006 he was forced to sign a succession treaty in favor of the future emperor Henry II. Rudolph attempted to renounce the treaty in 1016, but without success.

== Imperial Kingdom of Burgundy ==
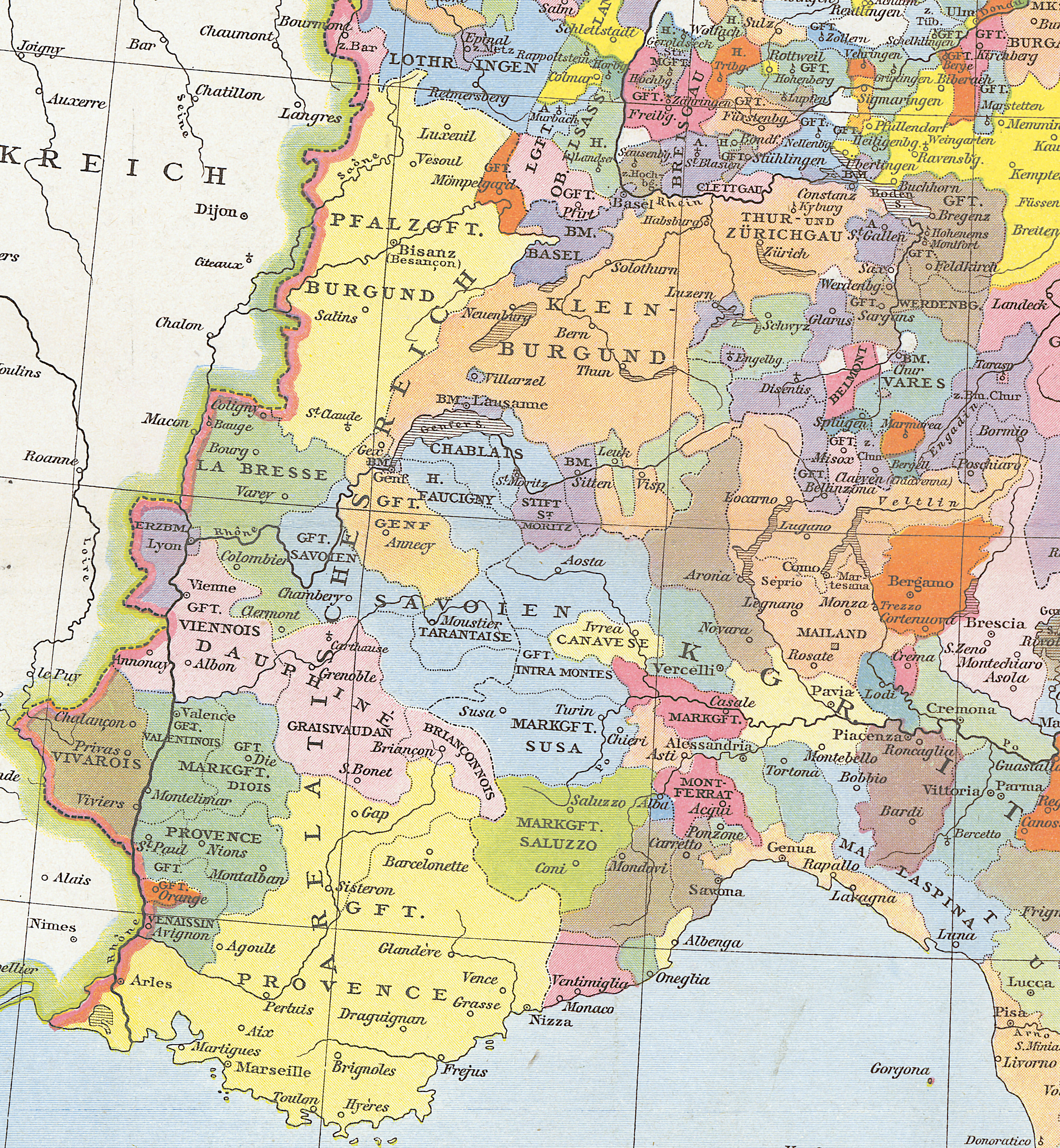
Feudal fragmentation of the Kingdom of Burgundy (Arles) during the 13th century

In 1032, king Rudolph III died without any surviving heirs, and in accordance with the 1006 treaty, the kingdom passed to Henry's successor, Emperor Conrad II from the Salian dynasty. Thus, the kingdom was incorporated into the Holy Roman Empire, though its territories operated with considerable autonomy.

In 1057, the empress Agnes (d. 1077), acting as the regent for her young son, Emperor Henry IV, appointed Rudolf of Rheinfelden as imperial representative and governor of Burgundy.

Emperor Lothair III (d. 1137) appointed Conrad I, Duke of Zähringen (d. 1152) as the imperial representative in the kingdom, titled as the Rector of Burgundy (Latin: Rector Burgundiae), and the same office was held by Conrad's successors from the House of Zähringen until Emperor Frederick II (d. 1250) decided to confer that title on his own son and designated heir, Henry (d. 1242).

Though from that time the emperors held the title "King of Arles", few went to be crowned in the cathedral of Arles. An exception was Frederick Barbarossa, who in 1157 held a diet in Besançon and in 1178 was crowned King of Burgundy by the archbishop of Arles.

In 1246, the French prince Charles I of Anjou succeeded in acquiring the County of Provence and the County of Forcalquier, thus establishing a Provençal branch of the House of Capet. In coordination with Pope Nicholas III, he made a stillborn attempt to revive the kingdom of Burgundy/Arles. Between 1277 and 1279, Charles, at that time already King of Sicily, Rudolf of Habsburg, King of the Romans and aspirant to the Imperial crown, and Margaret of Provence, queen dowager of France, settled their dispute over the County of Provence, and also over Rudolf's bid to become the sole Imperial candidate. Rudolf agreed that his daughter Clemence of Austria would marry Charles's grandson Charles Martel of Anjou, with the whole Arelat kingdom as her dowry. In exchange, Charles would support the imperial crown being made hereditary in the House of Habsburg. Nicholas III expected Northern Italy to become a kingdom carved out of Imperial territory, to be given to his family, the Orsini. In 1282, Charles was ready to send the child couple to reclaim the old royal title of Kings of Arles, but the War of the Sicilian Vespers frustrated his plans.

The Vivarais was the first of the kingdom's territories to be annexed to the Kingdom of France; this annexation occurred gradually during the 13th century and was formally recognized in 1306. The Lyonnais had been practically beyond the reach of the Empire since the late 12th century. Its incorporation into France was the result of internal conflicts between the Archbishop of Lyon, the cathedral chapter, and the city council. It was cemented in the early 14th century and formalized in a 1312 treaty between Archbishop Peter of Savoy and Philip IV of France. Emperor Henry VII protested against this but did not seriously challenge it.

From 1343, the French royal House of Valois tried to expand its influence over the Kingdom of Arles by acquiring feudal possessions in the region of Dauphiné, ruled by the childless dauphin Humbert II of Viennois. By 1349, Humbert finally decided to sell his domains to the House of Valois, and an agreement was made designating young French prince Charles (the future-king Charles V) as Humbert's successor, on the condition that the Dauphiné would remain a distinct polity and thus not be incorporated into the French realm. Thus in the summer of 1349, young Charles became the first Valois Dauphin de Viennois. In 1350, when his father ascended to the French throne, Charles became the heir presumptive and thus for the first time the two honors of Dauphin de Viennois and heir to the French throne were held by the same person.

In 1356, the young Charles, being the ruling Dauphin of Viennois, made an homage to the emperor Charles IV at Metz, and received imperial confirmation. On the same occasion, Charles was appointed as the imperial vicar in Dauphiné. Formally remaining an imperial fief within the Kingdom of Arles, the Dauphiné was from that time effectively controlled by the French royal House of Valois.

In 1361, Emperor Charles IV transferred the County of Savoy from the Kingdom of Burgundy to the Kingdom of Germany because of its strategic location.

In the spring of 1365, Emperor Charles IV came in person to the Kingdom of Arles. During the month of May he visited the County of Savoy, and appointed count Amadeus VI as imperial vicar over central regions of the Kingdom, from Lausanne and Geneva, to Lyon and Grenoble. At the same time, pretensions of the French royal House of Valois towards gaining the imperial vicariate over the region were rejected by the emperor. Proceeding to Arles, the emperor was crowned as king on 4 June (1365), by cardinal Guillaume de La Garde, the Archbishop of Arles, in the presence of high representatives of various regions, including Provence and Dauphiné, thus reaffirming imperial sovereignty over the Arlesian realm. That was the first coronation after a gap of nearly two centuries, following the previous Arlesian coronation of Frederick I in 1178. That attempt to revive the imperial hold on the Kingdom was mainly symbolic. Already in 1366, count Amadeus VI of Savoy was relieved of his duties as imperial vicar in the region.

During a state visit to Paris in early 1378, Emperor Charles IV granted the title of imperial vicar over the Kingdom of Burgundy (Arles) to the nine-year-old Charles, Dauphin of Viennois (future French king Charles VI), but only for his lifetime. Since Charles was Dauphin of Viennois and thus a holder of an imperial fief within the Kingdom, his appointment as the imperial vicar did not imply transfer of authority to the French crown, but in reality it was still seen as a gain for the House of Valois.

Imperial authority over the old Burgundian regions continued to decline, thus initiating the final stage of institutional dissolution of the Kingdom as a distinct entity. In 1421, Emperor Sigismund appointed Louis II of Chalon-Arlay as the Imperial vicar of Burgundy in the hope of restoring some imperial authority over Dauphiné, Viennois, and Provence. Those efforts were directed against rising ambitions of powerful Burgundian Duke Philip the Good. In 1463, the title of Imperial vicar was offered to Duke Philip himself, by Emperor Frederick III, as part of a proposed dynastic alliance between the houses of Burgundy and Austria, but no final agreement was reached, and thus the appointment was not accepted.

By that time French influence over northern parts of the Arlesian realm had been strengthened. In 1405, upon the death of Countess Margaret, who ruled the Free County of Burgundy in her own right, that imperial county was inherited by her son, John the Fearless, who was also the Duke of Burgundy. Since John belonged to the House of Valois-Burgundy, his acquisition of the county additionally increased French influence in regions belonging to the Kingdom of Burgundy/Arles. In 1477, upon the death of Charles the Bold, the French king seized not only the Duchy of Burgundy, which belonged to the French realm, but also the County of Burgundy, which was still an imperial fief. But in 1493, by the Treaty of Senlis, the county passed to Philip the Handsome of the House of Habsburg, thus reaffirming its attachment to the Empire.

In the southern regions of the Kingdom, the County of Provence was held by the House of Valois-Anjou, which also promoted French interests in the region. In 1481, the last Valois-Anjou count, Charles of Provence, died and left his domains to the French royal house, but under the condition that the county would not be integrated into the French realm. Thus, an effective French control was imposed in Province, but without formal annexation.

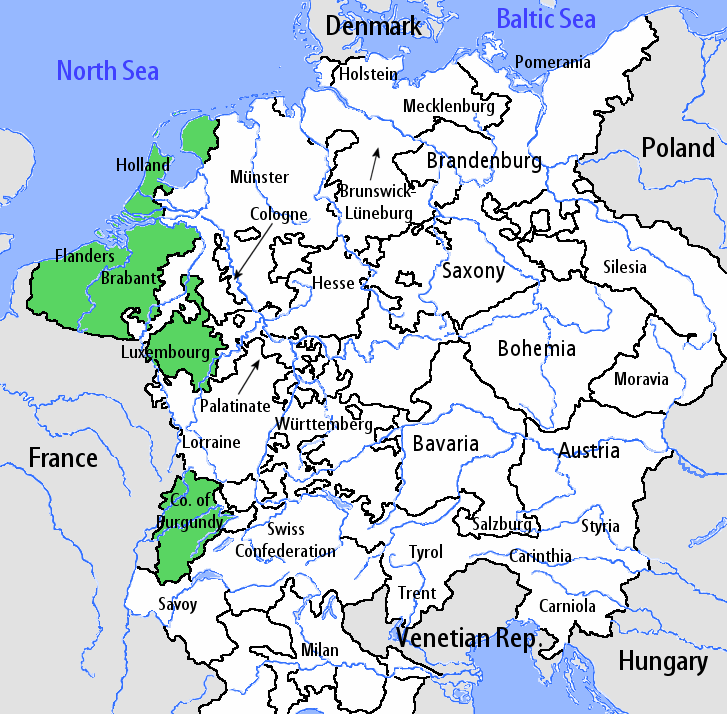
Burgundian Circle (green) in 1512

At the beginning of the 16th century, during the imperial reform, several imperial circles were created in 1512, one of them being the Burgundian Circle, which encompassed not only the Free County of Burgundy and the Free Imperial City of Besançon, but also much of the Habsburg Netherlands.

By that time, both the Dauphiné and Provence were already under French control, but those realities were not formally sanctioned by the Holy Roman Emperors. Thus in 1524, imperial troops invaded Provence during the Italian War of 1521–1526, but failed to capture the region. In 1525, during the peace negotiations between Emperor Charles V and French King François I, it was proposed that a realm centered on Arles and Provence could be renewed for Charles III, Duke of Bourbon (d. 1527), but those plans were abandoned and not included in the Treaty of Madrid (1526). In the summer of 1536, during the Italian War of 1536–1538, Emperor Charles V personally led the invasion of Provence. He took Aix-en-Provence on August 5, affirming there his rights to the Kingdom of Arles, but those gains were soon lost, and the war ended with the Treaty of Nice (1538).

Burgundian royal traditions were briefly revived in 1784, following the War of the Bavarian Succession (1777–1779), when Emperor Joseph II (d. 1790) proposed to the new Bavarian prince-elector Charles Theodore to exchange Bavaria for the Austrian Netherlands, offering him the title "King of Burgundy". While the Low Countries were not part of the Kingdom of Arles, they were part of the Burgundian State and the Burgundian Circle. The proposal was not accepted, and thus the plan failed.

By that time, the title of Imperial vicar of Burgundy had become extinct, while the title "King of Arles" remained one of the Holy Roman Emperor's official subsidiary titles until the dissolution of the Empire in 1806. The Archbishop of Trier continued to act as the Imperial Archchancellor of Burgundy/Arles, as codified by the Golden Bull of 1356. The remnants of the Kingdom of Arles became part of the imperial circles unlike Italian, Bohemian, or Swiss territories. All remaining Imperial states but Savoy were conquered by Louis XIV (r. 1643–1715).

== See also ==
- History of Burgundy
- Kings of Burgundy
- Upper Burgundy
- Lower Burgundy

== Literature ==
- Anderson, Matthew S. (2000) [1961]. Europe in the eighteenth century, 1713-1789. General history of Europe (4 ed.). Taylor & Francis. ISBN 978-1-317-87965-7.
- Bouchard, Constance B. (1987). Sword, Miter, and Cloister: Nobility and the Church in Burgundy, 980-1198. Ithaca and London: Cornell University Press.
- Bouchard, Constance B. (1988). "The Bosonids or Rising to Power in the Late Carolingian Age". French Historical Studies. 15 (3): 407–431.
- Bouchard, Constance B. (1999). "Burgundy and Provence, 879–1032". The New Cambridge Medieval History. Vol. 3. Cambridge: Cambridge University Press. pp. 328–345.
- Cope, Christopher (1986). Phoenix Frustrated: The Lost Kingdom of Burgundy. London: Constable.
- Cox, Eugene L. (1967). The Green Count of Savoy: Amedeus VI and Transalpine Savoy in the Fourteenth-Century. Princeton: Princeton University Press.
- Cox, Eugene L. (1999). "The Kingdom of Burgundy, the Lands of the House of Savoy and Adjacent Territories". The New Cambridge Medieval History. Vol. 5. Cambridge: Cambridge University Press. pp. 358–374.
- Davies, Norman (2011). Vanished Kingdoms: The History of Half-Forgotten Europe. London: Penguin.
- Fantysová-Matějková, Jana (2012). "The Holy Roman Emperor in the Toils of the French Protocol: The Visit of Charles IV to France". Imago Temporis: Medium Aevum. 6: 223–248.
- Fournier, Paul (1886). Le royaume d'Arles et de Vienne et ses relations avec l'empire: de la mort de Frédéric II à la mort de Rodolphe de Habsbourg, 1250–1291. Paris: Victor Palmé.
- Fournier, Paul (1891). Le royaume d'Arles et de Vienne (1138–1378): Étude sur la formation territoriale de la France dans l'Ést et le Sudest. Paris: Alphonse Picard.
- Fournier, Paul (1936). "The Kingdom of Burgundy or Arles from the Eleventh to the Fifteenth Century". In C. W. Previté-Orton; Z. N. Brooke (eds.). The Cambridge Medieval History, Volume VIII: The Close of the Middle Ages. Cambridge University Press. pp. 306–31.
- Fritz, Wolfgang D., ed. (2022) [1992]. Monumenta Germaniae Historica: Constitutiones et acta publica imperatorum et regum. Vol. 11. Wiesbaden: Harassowitz Verlag.
- Guiffrey, Jules (1868). Histoire de la réunion du Dauphiné à la France. Paris: Académie des bibliophiles.
- Heckmann, Marie-Luise (2000). "Das Reichsvikariat des Dauphins im Arelat 1378: vier Diplome zur Westpolitik Kaiser Karls IV". In Ellen Widder; Mark Mersiowsky; Maria-Theresia Leuker (eds.). Manipulus florum: Festschrift für Peter Johanek zum 60. Geburtstag. Münster: Waxmann. pp. 63–97.
- Hauff, Andrea (2017). "The Kingdom of Upper Burgundy and the East Frankish Kingdom at the beginning of the 10th century". History Compass. 15 (8): 1–12.
- Hauff, Andrea (2018). "Carolingian Traditions and New Beginnings: The Coronation of Rudolph I of Upper Burgundy". Bulletin du centre d'études médiévales d'Auxerre. 22 (1): 1–13.
- Kibler, William W.; Zinn, Grover A., eds. (2011) [1995]. Medieval France: An Encyclopedia. New York and London: Routledge.
- MacLean, Simon (2001). "The Carolingian response to the revolt of Boso, 879–887". French Historical Studies. 10 (1): 21–48.
- MacLean, Simon (2003). Kingship and Politics in the Late Ninth Century: Charles the Fat and the end of the Carolingian Empire. New York: Cambridge University Press.
- McKitterick, Rosamond (1983). The Frankish Kingdoms Under the Carolingians, 751-987. Harlow: Longman. ISBN 978-0-582-49005-5.
- Moeglin, Jean-Marie (2011). L'Empire et le Royaume: Entre indifférence et fascination 1214-1500 (in French). Villeneuve d'Ascq: Presses Universitaires du Septentrion.
- Parker, Geoffrey (2019). Emperor: A New Life of Charles V. New Haven and London: Yale University Press. ISBN 978-0-300-19652-8.
- Poupardin, René (1911). "Arles, Kingdom of" . In Chisholm, Hugh (ed.). Encyclopædia Britannica. Vol. 2 (11th ed.). Cambridge University Press. pp. 557–558.
- Poupardin, René (1907). Le royaume de Bourgogne (888–1038): étude sur les origines du royaume d'Arles. Paris: Honoré Champion.
- Previté-Orton, Charles William (1912). The Early History of the House of Savoy (1000–1233). Cambridge University Press.
- Reuter, Timothy (2013) [1991]. Germany in the Early Middle Ages c. 800–1056. London and New York: Routledge.
- Robinson, Ian S. (1999). Henry IV of Germany 1056-1106. Cambridge: Cambridge University Press.
- Small, Graeme (2006). "Of Burgundian dukes, counts, saints and kings (14 C.E. - c. 1500)". The Ideology of Burgundy: The Promotion of National Consciousness, 1364-1565. Leiden-Boston: Brill. pp. 151–194.
- Vaughan, Robert (2002) [1970]. Philip the Good: The Apogee of Burgundy (2nd ed.). Woodbridge: The Boydell Press.
- West, Charles (2023). The Fall of a Carolingian Kingdom: Lotharingia, 855–869. Toronto: University of Toronto Press. ISBN 978-1-4875-4518-5.
- Wilson, Peter (2016). Heart of Europe: A History of the Holy Roman Empire. Cambridge: Harvard University Press.
