= 855 =

Calendar year

855 in various calendars
- Gregorian calendar: 855; DCCCLV
- Ab urbe condita: 1608
- Armenian calendar: 304; ԹՎ ՅԴ
- Assyrian calendar: 5605
- Balinese saka calendar: 776–777
- Bengali calendar: 261–262
- Berber calendar: 1805
- Buddhist calendar: 1399
- Burmese calendar: 217
- Byzantine calendar: 6363–6364
- Chinese calendar: 甲戌年 (Wood Dog); 3552 or 3345 — to — 乙亥年 (Wood Pig); 3553 or 3346
- Coptic calendar: 571–572
- Discordian calendar: 2021
- Ethiopian calendar: 847–848
- Hebrew calendar: 4615–4616
- Hindu calendars
- Vikram Samvat: 911–912
- Shaka Samvat: 776–777
- Kali Yuga: 3955–3956
- Holocene calendar: 10855
- Iranian calendar: 233–234
- Islamic calendar: 240–241
- Japanese calendar: Saikō 2 (斉衡２年)
- Javanese calendar: 752–753
- Julian calendar: 855; DCCCLV
- Korean calendar: 3188
- Minguo calendar: 1057 before ROC 民前1057年
- Nanakshahi calendar: −613
- Seleucid era: 1166/1167 AG
- Thai solar calendar: 1397–1398
- Tibetan calendar: ཤིང་ཕོ་ཁྱི་ལོ་ (male Wood-Dog); 981 or 600 or −172 — to — ཤིང་མོ་ཕག་ལོ་ (female Wood-Boar); 982 or 601 or −171

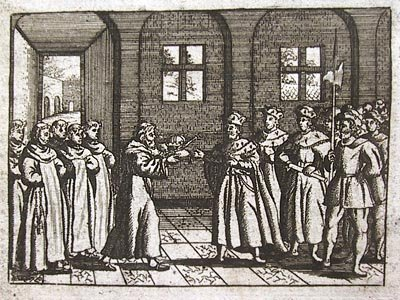
Emperor Lothair I divides Middle Francia between his three sons (Treaty of Prüm).

Year 855 (DCCCLV) was a common year starting on Tuesday of the Julian calendar.

== Events ==
=== By place ===
==== Byzantine Empire ====
- November 20 – Theoktistos, co-regent of the Empire on behalf of 15-year old Emperor Michael III, is murdered on the orders of Michael.

==== Central Europe ====
- September 29 – Emperor Lothair I dies after a 15-year reign (co-ruling with his father Louis the Pious until 840). He divides the Middle Frankish Kingdom between his three sons in an agreement called the Treaty of Prüm—the eldest, Louis II, receives the northern half of Italy and the title of Holy Roman Emperor. The second, Lothair II, receives Lotharingia (the Low Countries and Upper Burgundy). The youngest, Charles, receives Lower Burgundy and Provence.

==== Britain ====
- Spring – King Æthelwulf of Wessex decides to go on a pilgrimage to Rome, accompanied by his youngest son Alfred (age 6) and a large retinue. He divides the kingdom between his two eldest sons; Æthelbald receives the western part of Wessex, while Æthelberht becomes ruler over Kent, Surrey, Sussex and Essex.

==== Abbasid Caliphate ====
- Caliph al-Mutawakkil sends an Abbasid army, led by the Turkic general Bugha al-Kabir, to suppress an uprising of rebellious Armenian nakharars. He subdues the country, and deports many Armenian nobles to the caliphal capital of Samarra.

=== By topic ===
==== Religion ====
- July 17 – Pope Leo IV dies after an 8-year reign, and is succeeded by Benedict III as the 104th pope of Rome. Anastasius is made anti-pope by Lothair I.
- Æthelwulf grants churches in Wessex the right to receive tithes. He gives one-tenth of his lands to the Church.
- The Slavic alphabet is created by Saints Cyril and Methodius.

== Births ==
- Abu'l-Hasan Ali ibn al-Furat, Muslim vizier (d. 924)
- Gerald of Aurillac, Frankish nobleman (approximate date)
- Guaimar I of Salerno, Lombard prince (approximate date)
- Han Jian, Chinese warlord (d. 912)
- Jing Hao, Chinese painter (d. 915)

== Deaths ==
- July 17 – Leo IV, pope of the Catholic Church (b. 790)
- September 20 – Gozbald, abbot and bishop of Würzburg
- September 29 – Lothair I, Frankish king and emperor (b. 795)
- November 20 – Theoktistos, Byzantine chief minister
- December 8 – Drogo of Metz, illegitimate son of Charlemagne (b. 801)
- Ahmad ibn Hanbal, Muslim scholar and theologian (b. 780)
- Boso the Elder, count of Turin and Valois
- Cyngen ap Cadell, king of Powys (Wales)
- Elisedd ap Cyngen, king of Powys (Wales)
- Pepin, count of Vermandois (approximate date)
- Sahnun ibn Sa'id, Muslim jurist (or 854)
- Sico II, prince of Salerno (Italy)
