= Feudal fragmentation =

Split of a feudal state into smaller states

Feudal fragmentation is a process whereby a feudal state is split into smaller regional state structures, each characterized by significant autonomy, if not outright independence, and ruled by a high-ranking noble such as a prince or a duke. Feudal fragmentation is usually associated with European history, particularly during the Middle Ages.

Feudal fragmentation occurred after the death of the legitimate ruler leaves no clear heirs, and rulers of various subdivisions of the original state fail at electing or agreeing on a new leader for the previous, larger entity. In some cases (for example, the Holy Roman Empire), such a leader may be elected, yet wield much lesser powers than those of his predecessor. Feudal fragmentation is related to the concepts of agnatic seniority and principality.

Division of the Polish state in 1138: Seniorate Province. Pomeranian vassals under the rule of the Seniorate Province. Silesian Province of Władysław II. Masovian Province of Bolesław IV. Greater Poland Province of Mieszko III. Sandomierz Province of Henry. Łęczyca Province of Salomea of Berg.

== Examples ==
This phenomenon has occurred in the history of several countries and regions:

- In the history of Poland:
  - The regionalization or fragmentation of Poland (Polish: rozbicie dzielnicowe) refers to the period following the testament of Bolesław III Wrymouth (1138) that led to the split of the Kingdom of Poland into several mostly independent provinces, unified only by Ladislaus the Short approximately two centuries later, in the early 14th century
  - The fragmentation of the Duchy of Silesia into numerous smaller duchies under the Piast dynasty.
- In the history of Russia, the period of appanages started in the mid-12th century and ended in the mid-15th century, during the reign of Ivan III.
- In the history of Bulgaria, the late 14th century fragmentation of the Second Bulgarian Empire
- In the history of Hungary, the interregnum (1301–1323), Oligarchs
- In the history of Serbia, the fall of the Serbian Empire (1371–95)
- In the history of Georgia, the collapse of the Georgian realm (starting in the 13th century)
- In the history of Germany, the period described as the Kleinstaaterei lasted from the 13th century (the demise of the Hohenstaufen dynasty of the Holy Roman Empire) to 1871 (the unification of the German states into the German Empire). Many of the smaller states were eliminated during the French Revolutionary and Napoleonic Wars but several remained in their aftermath. Even within the German Empire many small states remained: the Ernestine duchies remained divided until the formation of the State of Thuringia in 1920 and others remained until their abolition under Nazi rule or by the occupying powers after WWII.
- After the extinction of the Duchy of Burgundy, some of its territory was absorbed by France's Louis XI, while its territory in the Low Countries (the Burgundian Netherlands) became the Habsburg Netherlands (also called the Seventeen Provinces), which itself splintered into the Spanish Netherlands and the Dutch Republic
- In the history of France, the period after the fall of the Carolingian dynasty and death of Charlemagne to its unification by Louis XI (see also Crown lands of France)
- In the history of Italy, the period from the invasion of Italy by the Lombards (which occurred shortly after Italy was united under the Byzantine Empire as a result of the Gothic War) until Italian unification

According to Samir Amin, feudal fragmentation has been mostly a European phenomenon and did not occur in the history of China or Islamic Middle Eastern states. At the same time, the term feudal fragmentation has been used in the context of history of China (the Warring States period) and history of Japan (the Sengoku period).

== See also ==
- Anatolian beyliks, after the decline of Sultanate of Rum
- Balkanization
- Division of the Mongol Empire
- Decentralization
- District duchy
- Division of the Frankish Empire under Charlemagne's successors 843-880 (Treaties of Verdun, Prüm, Meerssen and Ribemont)
- Gavelkind
- Petty kingdom
  - Sub-Roman Britain
    - Wales in the Early Middle Ages
    - the Heptarchy, a period of the history of England characterised by petty kingdoms until their unification into the Kingdom of England in the tenth century
- Rump state
- Taifa periods, after the decline of the Caliphate of Córdoba (1031) and the Almoravid dynasty (1140s)
