= Treaty of Ribemont =

880 treaty dividing the Carolingian Empire

- Division of the Frankish Empire after the Treaty of Ribemont in 880.: 1 (pink): Italy, Alamannia, Upper Burgundy; 2 (green): The rest of East Francia; 3 (violet): North-West Francia (Neustria); 4 (dark red): South-West Francia (Aquitaine); 5 (orange): Lower Burgundy with Provence
- Date: February 880
- Location: Ribemont
- Participants: Louis the Younger, Louis III of France, Carloman II of France
- Outcome: Dynastic concord between the Carolingians; Western Lotharingia given to East Francia

The Treaty of Ribemont was a dynastic treaty concluded in the city of Ribemont in February 880, between the East Frankish king Louis the Younger, and his cousins, West Frankish kings Louis III and Carloman II. The treaty secured concord between two branches of the Carolingian dynasty, and also confirmed the previously agreed (879) transfer of the western half of Lotharingia from the West Frankish jurisdiction to the East Frankish king, who already ruled over eastern Lotharingia.

== History ==
After the death of emperor Charles the Bald in 877, king Louis the Younger secured the friendship of Charles' successor, West Frankish Louis the Stammerer with the Treaty of Fourons in November 878. The two cousins promised to accept the successions of their respective sons. The treaty was put to the test when Louis the Stammerer died in April 879. A western delegation led by bishop Gauzlin of Paris, invited Louis the Younger to take control of West Francia. Accepting the invitation, East Frankish king invaded West Francia and reached as far as Verdun, receiving another West Frankish delegation that offered him western part of Lotharingia in exchange for recognizing young kings Louis III and Carloman II as rulers in the rest of West Francia. The offer was accepted, and Louis the Younger returned to East Francia upon receiving the offered region.

Meanwhile, count Boso of Vienne, a noble with strong Carolingian connections, proclaimed himself king and seized power in Lower Burgundy and Provence. Moreover, the Vikings resumed their attacks. To deal with these threats, the Carolingian kings decided to deal with the threats together. In February 880, they met at Ribemont, in present-day Aisne. In return for Louis the Younger's support, the kings of West Francia acknowledged the previously agreed possession of East Frankish king over the whole of Lotharingia, thus including the western part of that region, which West Francia had previously acquired by the Treaty of Meerssen (870). The two brothers were thereafter free to deal with Boso. They were aided by Louis the Younger and his brother, king Charles the Fat, who was ruling in Alamannia, Upper Burgundy and Italy. Boso suffered several territorial loses, but still kept his kingdom.

Thus, after 880, Carolingian territories remained divided into five parts. The border set in Ribemont between West Francia (precursor to the Kingdom of France) and East Francia (precursor to the Holy Roman Empire) remained largely the same until the Late Middle Ages.

Earlier Frankish partitions were:

- Treaty of Verdun (843)
- Treaty of Prüm (855)
- Treaty of Meerssen (870)

== Sources ==
- Bouchard, Constance B. (1988). "The Bosonids or Rising to Power in the Late Carolingian Age". French Historical Studies. 15 (3): 407–431.
- Goldberg, Eric J. (2006). Struggle for Empire: Kingship and Conflict under Louis the German, 817-876. Ithaca, NY: Cornell University Press.
- MacLean, Simon (2001). "The Carolingian response to the revolt of Boso, 879–887". French Historical Studies. 10 (1): 21–48.
- MacLean, Simon (2003). Kingship and Politics in the Late Ninth Century: Charles the Fat and the end of the Carolingian Empire. New York: Cambridge University Press.
- MacLean, Simon (2009). History and Politics in Late Carolingian and Ottonian Europe: The Chronicle of Regino of Prüm and Adalbert of Magdeburg. Manchester and New York: Manchester University Press.
- McKitterick, Rosamond (1983). The Frankish Kingdoms Under the Carolingians, 751-987. Harlow: Longman.
- McKitterick, Rosamond (2008). Charlemagne: The Formation of a European Identity. Cambridge: Cambridge University Press.
- Nelson, Janet L. (1991). The Annals of St-Bertin. Manchester: Manchester University Press.
- Reuter, Timothy (2013) [1991]. Germany in the Early Middle Ages c. 800–1056. London and New York: Routledge.
- Reuter, Timothy (2006). Medieval Polities and Modern Mentalities. Cambridge: Cambridge University Press.
- West, Charles (2023). The Fall of a Carolingian Kingdom: Lotharingia, 855–869. Toronto: University of Toronto Press.
- Wickham, Chris (1981). Early Medieval Italy: Central Power and Local Society, 400-1000. Totowa, NJ: Barnes & Noble.
