= Treaty of Verdun =

843 treaty dividing the Frankish Empire between the grandsons of Charlemagne

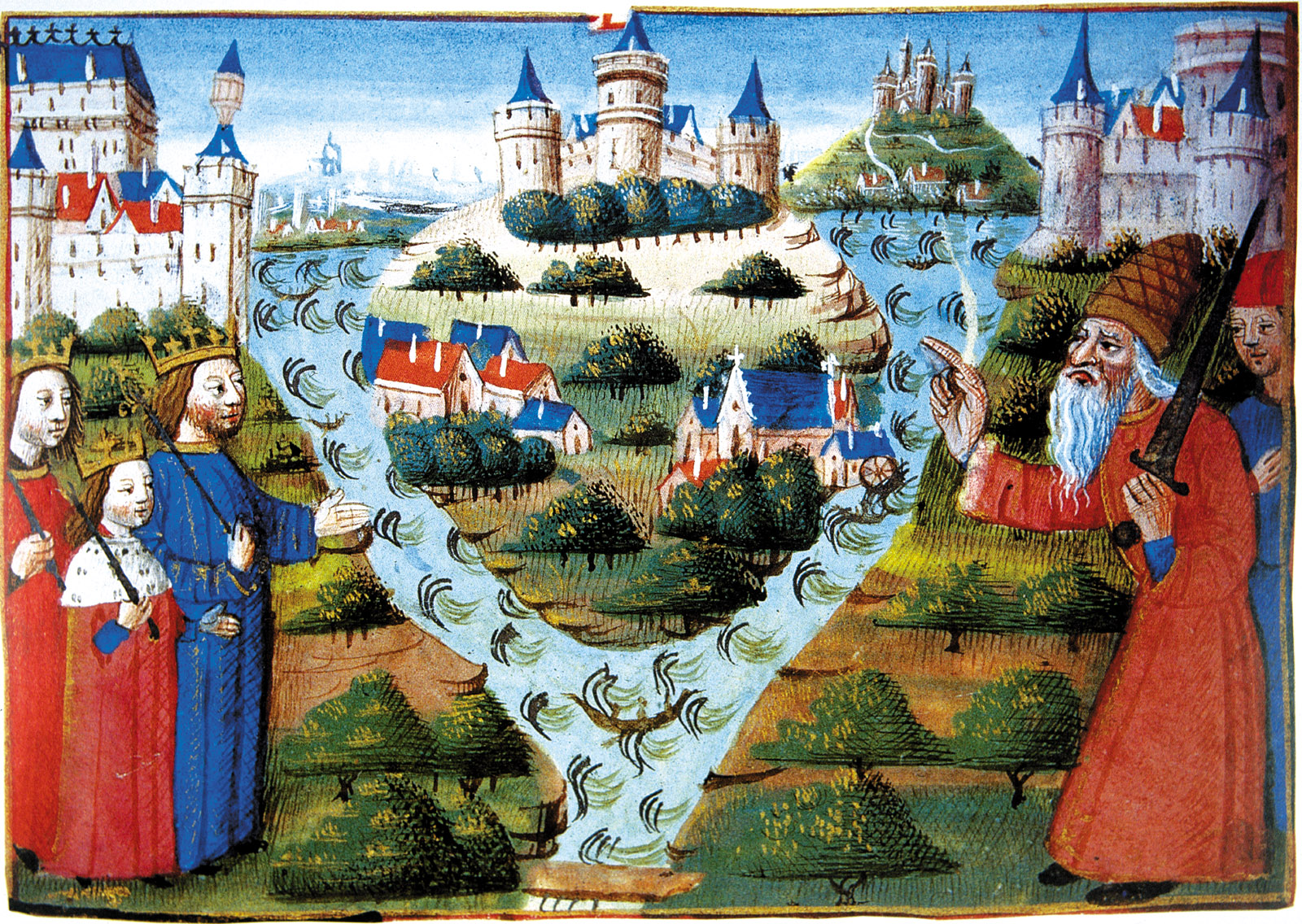
- Emperor Louis I (right) blessing the division of the Frankish Empire in 843 into West Francia, Middle Francia, and East Francia; from the Grandes Chroniques de France, 15th century
- Signed: 10 August 843
- Location: Verdun, Francia
- Parties: Charles II; Lothair I; Louis II

The Treaty of Verdun (French: Traité de Verdun; German: Vertrag von Verdun), agreed to on 10 August 843, ended the Carolingian civil war and divided the Carolingian Empire between Lothair I, Louis II and Charles II, the surviving sons of the emperor Louis I. The treaty was the culmination of negotiations lasting more than a year. It was the first in a series of partitions contributing to the dissolution of the empire created by Charlemagne and has been seen as foreshadowing the formation of many of the modern countries of western Europe.

The treaty was the first of the four partition treaties of the Carolingian Empire, followed by the Treaties of Prüm (855), Meerssen (870), and Ribemont (880).

== Background ==
Following Charlemagne's death, Louis was made ruler of the Frankish Empire. Agobard, archbishop of Lyon, opposed the division of the empire, as he claimed that it would divide the church. During his reign, Louis the Pious divided the empire so that each of his sons could rule over their own kingdom under the greater rule of their father. Louis’ eldest son, Lothair I, was given the title of emperor but because of several re-divisions by his father and the resulting revolts, he became much less powerful. When Louis died in 840, Lothair I claimed overlordship over the entirety of his father's kingdom in an attempt to reclaim the power he had at the beginning of his reign as emperor. He also supported his nephew Pepin II's claim to Aquitaine, a large province in the west of the Frankish realm. Lothair's brother, Louis II, and his half-brother Charles II refused to acknowledge Lothair's suzerainty and declared war against him. After a bloody civil war, they defeated Lothair at the Battle of Fontenoy in 841 and sealed their alliance in 842 with the Oaths of Strasbourg which declared Lothair unfit for the imperial throne, after which he became willing to negotiate a settlement. The meeting happened shortly before August 10, as confirmed by a contemporary letter.

== Provisions ==
Partition of the Frankish Empire after the Treaty of Verdun 843: Francia Occidentalis Francia Media Francia Orientalis

Each of the three brothers was already established in one kingdom: Lothair in the Kingdom of Italy; Louis the German in the Kingdom of Bavaria; and Charles II in the Kingdom of Aquitaine.

- Lothair I received Francia Media (the Middle Frankish kingdom).

In the settlement, Lothair (who had been named co-emperor in 817) retained his title as emperor, but it conferred only nominal overlordship of his brothers' lands. His domain later became the Low Countries, the Rhineland west of the Rhine, Lorraine, Alsace, Burgundy, Provence, and the Kingdom of Italy (which covered the northern half of the Italian Peninsula). He also received the two imperial cities, Aachen and Rome.

- Louis II received Francia Orientalis (the East Frankish kingdom).

He was guaranteed the kingship of all lands to the east of the Rhine (although not the Netherlands to the north of the Rhine) and to the north and east of Italy, altogether called East Francia. It eventually became the high medieval Kingdom of Germany, the largest component of the Holy Roman Empire.

- Charles II received Francia Occidentalis (the West Frankish kingdom).

Pepin II was granted the Kingdom of Aquitaine, but only under the authority of Charles. Charles received all lands west of the Rhône, called West Francia. It eventually became the Kingdom of France.

After Lothair's death in 855, his eldest son, Louis II, inherited Italy and his father's claim to the Imperial throne. Upper Burgundy and Lower Burgundy (Arles and Provence) passed to Lothair's third son, Charles of Provence. The remaining territory north of the Alps, which did not previously have a name, was inherited by Lothair's second son, Lothair II, and was then named Lotharingia (present day Lorraine) after him.

== Legacy ==
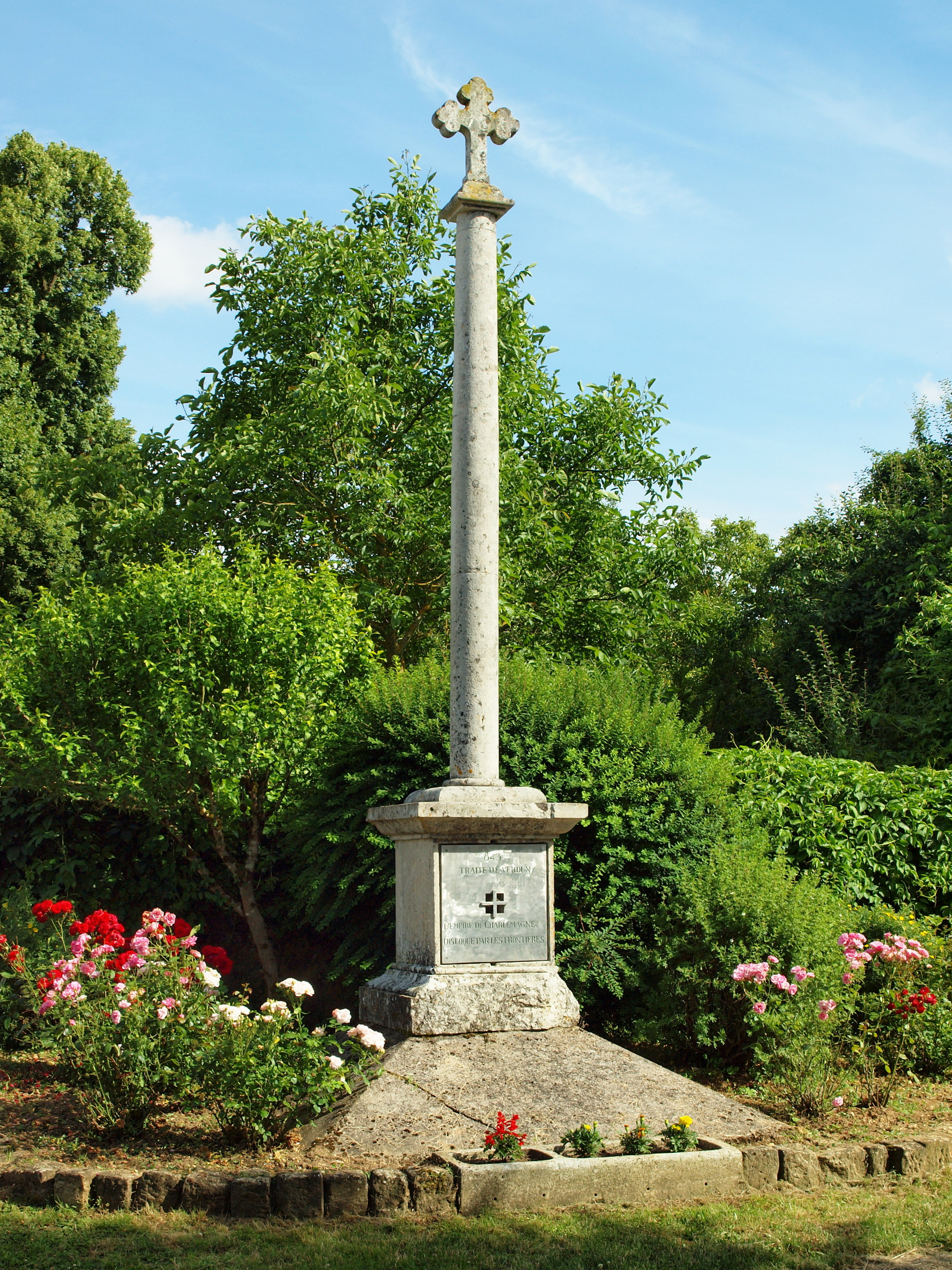
Treaty of Verdun Memorial at Fontenoy-en-Puisaye

The division reflected an adherence to the old Frankish custom of partible or divisible inheritance amongst a ruler's sons, rather than primogeniture (i.e., inheritance by the eldest son) which would soon be adopted by both Frankish kingdoms. Since Lotharingia combined lengthy and vulnerable land borders with poor internal communications as it was severed by the Alps, it was not a viable entity and soon fragmented. This made it difficult for a single ruler to reassemble Charlemagne's empire. Only Charles the Fat achieved this briefly.

In 855, the northern section became fragile Lotharingia, which became disputed by the more powerful states that evolved out of Francia Occidentalis (present day France) and Francia Orientalis (present day Germany). Generations of kings of France and Germany were unable to establish a firm rule over Lothair's kingdom. While the north of Lotharingia was then composed of independent countries, the southern third of Lotharingia, Alsace-Lorraine, was traded back and forth between France and Germany from the 18th to the 20th century. In 1766, it passed to France after the death of Stanisław Leszczyński, who had acquired the region from the German Habsburgs by the Treaty of Vienna (1738) ending the War of Polish Succession (1733–1738). In 1871, Alsace-Lorraine became German, after the victory of Prussia and its German allies over the French in the Franco-Prussian War (1870–1871). In 1919, it became French again by the Treaty of Versailles (1919), following the French victory over the Germans in World War I (1914–1918). In 1940, Germany re-annexed Alsace-Lorraine following Germany's conquest of France. Finally, in 1945, after World War II (1939–1945), Alsace-Lorraine was solidified as French territory, which it remains to this day, more than a thousand years after the Treaty of Verdun. The collapse of the Middle Frankish Kingdom also compounded the disunity of the Italian Peninsula, which persisted into the 19th century.

== See also ==
- Oaths of Strasbourg (842)
- Treaty of Coulaines (843)
- Treaty of Prüm (855)
- Treaty of Meerssen (870)
- Treaty of Ribemont (880)
