= Treaty of Prüm =

855 treaty partitioning the Carolingian Empire

- Division of the Frankish Empire after the Treaty of Prüm in 855. Lotharingia Italy East Francia West Francia Provence
- Date: 19 September 855
- Location: Schüller
- Participants: Lothair I, Lothair II, Louis II of Italy, Charles of Provence
- Outcome: Divided Middle Francia into three kingdoms.

The Treaty of Prüm, concluded on 19 September 855, was the second of the main partition treaties of the Carolingian Empire. As Emperor Lothair I was approaching death, he divided his realm of Middle Francia among his three sons.

== Background ==
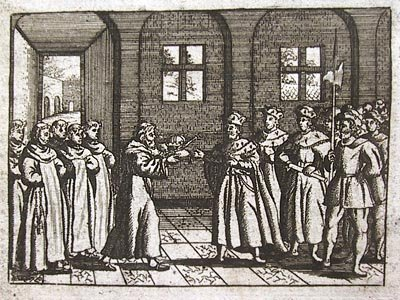
Lothair I dividing his realm between his sons (copper engraving, 1698)

From 830, Lothair and his brothers Pepin I of Aquitaine (died 838) and Louis the German had fought several inner dynastic battles with their father Emperor Louis the Pious. The emperor's death in 840 started another fight for the inheritance between his three surviving sons Lothair I, Louis the German, and Charles the Bald (the son of Louis the Pious' second marriage). Lothair, eldest son and co-ruling Holy Roman Emperor with his father since 817, claimed supremacy but was denied and defeated by the united forces of his brothers at the 841 Battle of Fontenoy.

Emperor Lothair finally had to yield the superior strength of Louis the German and Charles the Bald, who confirmed their pact by the Oaths of Strasbourg. He concluded his fighting and in August 843 signed the Treaty of Verdun with his younger brothers. As a result of this treaty, the empire of late Louis the Pious ("Francia") was officially divided between his three surviving sons: Louis the German received the lands east of the Rhine and Aare rivers ("East Francia"), Charles the Bald the territories west of the Scheldt, Meuse, Saône, and Rhône ("West Francia"), while Lothair retained the interjacent lands from Frisia to Italy, including the cities of Aachen and Rome ("Middle Francia" or Lotharii Regnum), and the title of Holy Roman Emperor.

Though the Carolingian rulers stressed the idea of a unified empire, the gradual dissolution by partible inheritance continued. Mainly Lothair's Middle Frankish realm combined lengthy and vulnerable borders with poor internal communications. Devastated both by Viking raids in the north and Muslim incursions in the south, it was not a viable entity and soon fragmented.

== Provisions ==
Already seriously ill, Emperor Lothair I staying at his estate in Schüller (Sconilare) on 19 September 855 further divided the Lotharii Regnum between his sons:

Divisions of the Kingdom

Louis II († 875), the eldest son, was granted the imperial crown and the Kingdom of Italy (then only comprising the northern half of the Italian peninsula)

Lothair II († 869) was granted Frisia and the parts of Austrasia that remained his father's after the Treaty of Verdun (containing the original area of the Roman Empire settled by the Franks and the capital of Aachen) - this kingdom became known as Lotharingia after its ruler and was the shortest-lived of the three successor kingdoms, succeeded by the duchies of Upper and Lower Lorraine about one hundred years later.

Charles († 863), the youngest of the three sons, became King of Provence, being granted Provence and the greater part of the former Frankish Kingdom of Burgundy (except for the lands west of the Saône river which had been given to West Francia at Verdun and would later become the French Duchy of Burgundy) - this kingdom would later evolve into the Kingdom of Burgundy (also known as Kingdom of Arles from the 12th century)

Lothair I himself abdicated and retired to Prüm Abbey in the Eifel range where he died ten days later.

== Legacy ==
Due to the deaths of Charles in 863 and Lothair II in 869, Burgundy and Lotharingia were again divided between East Francia, West Francia and the Kingdom of Italy by the 870 Treaty of Meerssen. The effects of the Treaty of Prüm came to a complete end, when in 951 King Otto I of Germany invaded and conquered Italy during a period of political unrest and married the former queen consort Adelaide. He attained the Iron Crown of Lombardy and was finally crowned King of Italy and Holy Roman Emperor in 962.

The Treaty of Prüm is regarded as one of the last significant effects of partible inheritance before being surpassed by feudalism as the primary cause of European state decentralization.

== See also ==
- Treaty of Verdun (843)
- Treaty of Meerssen (870)
- Treaty of Ribemont (880)

== Sources ==
- Goldberg, Eric J. (2006). Struggle for Empire: Kingship and Conflict under Louis the German, 817-876. Ithaca, NY: Cornell University Press.
- McKitterick, Rosamond (1983). The Frankish Kingdoms Under the Carolingians, 751-987. Harlow: Longman.
- McKitterick, Rosamond (2008). Charlemagne: The Formation of a European Identity. Cambridge: Cambridge University Press.
- Reuter, Timothy (2013) [1991]. Germany in the Early Middle Ages c. 800–1056. London and New York: Routledge.
- Reuter, Timothy (2006). Medieval Polities and Modern Mentalities. Cambridge: Cambridge University Press.
- West, Charles (2023). The Fall of a Carolingian Kingdom: Lotharingia, 855–869. Toronto: University of Toronto Press.
