= Treaty of Meerssen =

870 treaty partitioning Lotharingia

- Division of the Frankish Empire after the Treaty of Meerssen in 870. Italy East Francia West Francia
- Date: 8 August 870
- Location: Meerssen
- Participants: Louis the German, Charles the Bald
- Outcome: Middle Francia partitioned between Louis the German, Charles the Bald and Louis II of Italy.

The Treaty of Mersen or Meerssen, concluded on 8 August 870, was a treaty to partition the realm of Lothair II, known as Lotharingia, by his uncles Louis the German of East Francia and Charles the Bald of West Francia, the two surviving sons of Emperor Louis I the Pious. The treaty followed an earlier Treaty of Prüm which had split Middle Francia between Lothair I's sons after his death in 855.

The treaty is referred to in some Western European historiographies as the third major partition of Francia, all of which took place from August 843 to August 870, through the treaties of Verdun, Prüm and Meerssen. It was followed by the Treaty of Ribemont.

== Context ==
In 869, Lothair II died without legitimate children, so his heir was his brother, Emperor Louis II of Italy. As Louis was at that time campaigning against the Emirate of Bari, his uncles, Louis the German and Charles the Bald, took his inheritance. Charles had himself crowned in Metz the same year, but was forced by his brother to partition the short-lived Lotharingia, together with the lands Lothair II acquired after the death of Charles of Provence, as they had agreed at Metz in 868.

Their contract of 870 at Meerssen replaced the 843 Treaty of Verdun, after which the Carolingian Empire was also split into three parts, by dividing the northern half of Middle Francia stretching from the Rhone valley to the North Sea, in effect recombining sundered territories of Francia into two larger east and west divisions. However, at this time large parts of the Frisian coast were under Viking control and therefore only divided on paper. The borderline ran roughly along the rivers Meuse, Ourthe, Moselle, Saone and Rhone.

In the north, Louis received most of Lothair's Austrasia, with his eastern part including both Aachen and Metz, and most of Frisia. In the south, however, while Louis received most of Upper Burgundy that was left to Lothair (after ceding the southern half to Italy), Charles received Lothair's inheritance in Lower Burgundy (including Lyon and Vienne) and a small western part of Upper Burgundy (parts of Portois and Varais (including Besançon)) – this opened him the way to Italy. Louis joined the newly acquired parts of central Austrasia to the subkingdom of his son Louis the Younger in eastern Austrasia, while the illegitimate son of Lothair II, Hugh, was granted the Duchy of Alsace.

== Previous treaties ==
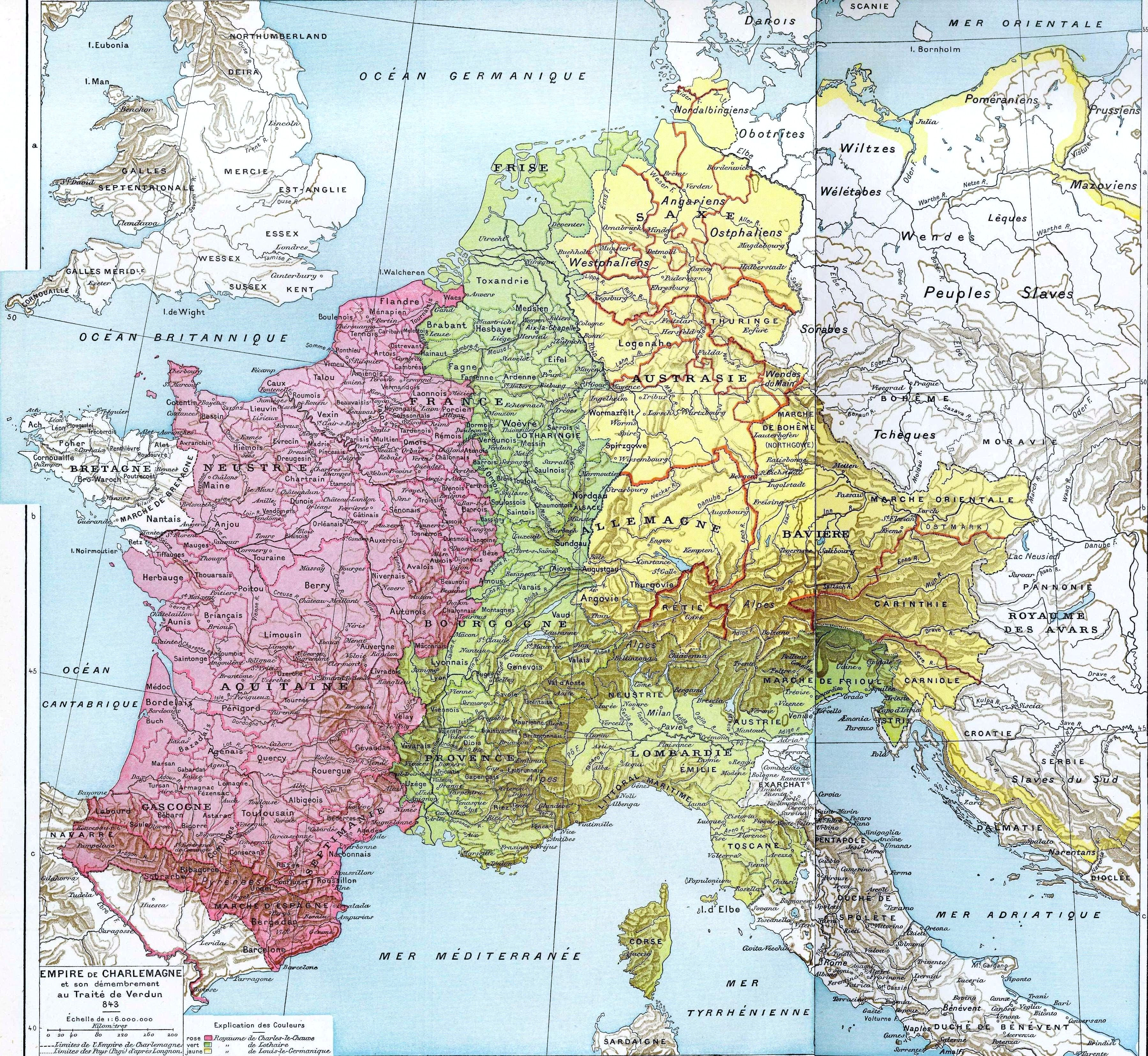
Map of the Carolingian Empire in 843 showing lower levels of administrative division

=== Division of 843 ===
The empire of Louis the Pious, son of Charlemagne, had originally split in three parts by the 843 Treaty of Verdun:

Lothair I, his eldest son, received the Imperial crown and the personal realm of Middle Francia

Louis the German († 876), the second born son, received East Francia (which would evolve into the Kingdom of Germany)

Charles the Bald († 877), his half-brother, received West Francia (which would evolve into the Kingdom of France), although this was disputed by Pepin II of Aquitaine until he was captured

=== Division of 855 ===
Division after the treaty of Prüm (855)

Upon the death of Lothair I in 855, his realm of Middle Francia was partitioned between his sons by the Treaty of Prüm:

Louis II of Italy († 875), the eldest son, received the imperial crown and Italy

Charles of Provence († 863) became King of Provence (Lower Burgundy and Provence proper), later partitioned by Louis II and Lothair II

Lothair II († 869) received Austrasia (the central part still controlled by his father after Verdun), Frisia and Upper Burgundy – this realm came to be named Lotharii Regnum (Lotharingia)

East Francia and West Francia remained as before:

Louis the German († 876) ruled East Francia

Charles the Bald († 877) ruled West Francia

Lothair II ceded the southeastern parts of Upper Burgundy to his brothers, whereupon Charles of Provence received the bishoprics of Belley and Tarentaise in 858, and Louis II of Italy the bishoprics of Geneva, Lausanne and Sion the next year.

=== Division of 863 ===
Division of 863

Charles of Provence, who suffered from epilepsy, died heirless in 863, and his kingdom was partitioned between his brothers. Lothair II received the western Lower Burgundian parts (bishoprics of Lyon, Vienne, Vivarais and Uzès) which were bordering his western Upper Burgundy (remnants of his original Burgundian possessions), while Louis II received the rest of the Kingdom of Provence.

== Legacy ==
The arrangement did not endure more than ten years. Upon the death of Louis the German in 876, Charles the Bald, by then King of Italy and Emperor, attacked eastern Lotharingia, but was defeated by Louis the Younger in the Battle of Andernach (876). In turn, after Charles the Bald had died and his successors struggled to consolidate their rule over West Francia, Louis the Younger campaigned in western Lotharingia in 879. Charles's grandsons were forced to cede the whole of Lotharingia to him, sealed by the 880 Treaty of Ribemont, according to which it finally became part of East Francia.

== See also ==
- Carolingian dynasty
- Treaty of Verdun (843)
- Treaty of Prüm (855)
- Treaty of Ribemont (880)

== Sources ==
- Chisholm, Hugh, ed. (1911). "Mersen, Treaty of" . Encyclopædia Britannica (11th ed.). Cambridge University Press.
- Goldberg, Eric J. (2006). Struggle for Empire: Kingship and Conflict under Louis the German, 817-876. Ithaca, NY: Cornell University Press. ISBN 978-0-8014-3890-5.
- McKitterick, Rosamond (1983). The Frankish Kingdoms Under the Carolingians, 751-987. Harlow: Longman. ISBN 978-0-582-49005-5.
- McKitterick, Rosamond (2008). Charlemagne: The Formation of a European Identity. Cambridge: Cambridge University Press. ISBN 978-1-139-47285-2.
- Reuter, Timothy (2013) [1991]. Germany in the Early Middle Ages c. 800–1056. London and New York: Routledge. ISBN 978-1-317-87239-9.
- Reuter, Timothy (2006). Medieval Polities and Modern Mentalities. Cambridge: Cambridge University Press. ISBN 978-1-139-45954-9.
- West, Charles (2023). The Fall of a Carolingian Kingdom: Lotharingia, 855–869. Toronto: University of Toronto Press. ISBN 978-1-4875-4518-5.
