= Lotharingia =

Western European kingdom and duchy (855–959)

Kingdom of Lotharingia Duchy of Lotharingia
- 855–959
- The realm of Lothair II (orange) and other Carolingian realms following the Treaty of Prüm, 855
- Status: Kingdom (855–869, 895–900); Duchy (903–959)
- Common languages: Old Franconian; Old Frisian; Old Dutch; Old High German; Old Saxon; Old French; Yiddish; Medieval Latin
- Religion: Roman Catholicism
- Government: Monarchy
- King or Duke
  - 855–869: Lothair II
  - 953–965: Bruno the Great
- Historical era: Medieval
  - Treaty of Prüm: 855
  - Division: 959/965
Preceded by
Middle Francia
Succeeded by
Lower Lotharingia
Duchy of Lorraine
Duchy of Swabia

Lotharingia was a historical region and an early medieval polity that existed during the late Carolingian and early Ottonian era, from the middle of the 9th to the middle of the 10th century. It was established in 855 by the Treaty of Prüm as a distinct kingdom within the Carolingian Empire, but abolished already in 869–870 when it was divided by the Treaty of Meerssen. It was territorially reunited in 880 by the Treaty of Ribemont, and reestablished as a kingdom from 895 to 900. Since 903 it was organized as a duchy, which existed up to 959 or 965, when it was divided into two distinct duchies: Upper Lotharingia (southern half), and Lower Lotharingia (northern half). Before the final division, the region comprised present-day Lorraine (France), Luxembourg, parts of Switzerland, parts of modern Germany west of the Rhine, most of Belgium, and the Netherlands.

The regional name Lotharingia means, approximately, "the land of Lothair", and was derived from the name of its first ruler, king Lothair II, who received this territory as his share of the Kingdom of Middle Francia. Several consecutive conflicts between East and West Francia over Lotharingia were based on the fact that these were the old Frankish homelands of Austrasia, so possession of them was a matter of great prestige to their kings as true claimant of Frankish imperial legacy.

Several traditional views on the nature and chronology of the final division of Lotharingia in 959-965 have been analyzed by modern scholars, who noted that some of the key sources for the period in question are preserved only as later copies, some of them being doubtful or interpolated.

== Name ==
Lotharingia was known as regnum quondam Lotharii or regnum Lotharii ("kingdom [once] Lothair's").

Its inhabitants were known as Lotharii (from Lotharius), Lotharienses (from Lothariensis), or Lotharingi (which gives the modern Dutch, German, and Luxembourgish names for the province Lotharingen, Lothringen, and Loutrengen respectively). The latter term, formed with the Germanic suffix -ing, indicating ancestral or familial relationships, gave rise to the Latin term Lotharingia (from the Latin suffix -ia, indicating a country) in the 10th century.

Later French terms such as "Lorraine" and "Lothier" are derived from the Latin term.

== Middle Francia, 843–855 ==
In 817, Emperor Louis the Pious made plans for division of the Carolingian Empire among his three sons after his death. Unforeseen in 817 was a further heir besides Louis's three grown sons. A fourth son, Charles the Bald, was born to Louis's second wife Judith of Bavaria in 823. When Louis tried in 833 to re-divide the empire for the benefit of Charles, he met with opposition from his adult sons, Lothair, Pepin, and Louis. A decade of civil war and fluctuating alliances followed, punctuated by brief periods of peace.

Pepin died in 838, and Louis the Pious in 840. The remaining three brothers made peace and divided the Empire with the 843 Treaty of Verdun. Lothair, as the eldest, kept the imperial title and received a long strip of territories stretching from the North Sea to southern Italy. The logic of the division was that Lothair had the crown of the Kingdom of Italy, which had been his subkingdom under Louis the Pious, and that as emperor he should rule in Aachen, the capital of the first Carolingian emperor, Charlemagne, and in Rome, the ancient capital of emperors. Middle Francia (Latin Francia media) thus included all the land between Aachen and Rome, and it has sometimes been called by historians the "Lotharingian axis".

== Kingdom of Lotharingia ==
In 855, when Lothair I was dying in Prüm Abbey, he divided his kingdom among his three sons with the Treaty of Prüm. To the eldest son, Louis II, went Italy, with the imperial title. To the youngest, Charles, still a minor, went Provence. To the middle son, Lothair II, went the remaining territories to the north of Provence, a kingdom which lacked ethnic or linguistic unity.

Lothair II ruled from Aachen and did not venture outside his kingdom. When he died in 869, Lothair II left no legitimate children, but one illegitimate son - Hugh, Duke of Alsace. His uncles, the kings of East Francia Louis the German and West Francia Charles the Bald (who wanted to rule the whole of Lotharingia) agreed to divide Lotharingia between them with the 870 Treaty of Meerssen - the western half went to West Francia and the eastern half to East Francia. Thus, Lotharingia, as a united kingdom, ceased to exist for some years. In 876, Charles the Bald invaded eastern Lotharingia with the intent to capture it, but was defeated near Andernach by Louis's son, Louis the Younger.

In 879, Louis the Younger was invited by a faction of the West Frankish nobility to succeed king Louis the Stammerer, Charles's son, on the throne of West Francia. After a brief war, Louis the Stammerer's young sons, Carloman II and Louis III, ceded western Lotharingia to Louis. The border between the two kingdoms was established at Saint-Quentin in 880 by the Treaty of Ribemont.

In November 887, Arnulf of Carinthia called a council of East Frankish nobility to depose emperor Charles the Fat, who by 884 had succeeded to the thrones of all the kingdoms of the Empire. The Lotharingian aristocracy, in an attempt to assert its right to elect a sovereign, joined the other East Frankish nobles in deposing Charles the Fat in 887 and elected Arnulf as their king. The rule of Arnulf in East Francia was initially opposed by Guy III of Spoleto, who became king of Italy, and by Rudolph I of Burgundy, who was elected king in the southern half of former Middle Francia - Upper Burgundy. Rudolph had intended to make himself king over the whole of Lothair II's former kingdom, but had to be content with Burgundia.

Arnulf defeated the Vikings in 891 and dislodged them from their settlements at Louvain. In 895, he appointed his illegitimate son Zwentibold as the king of Lotharingia who ruled semi-independently until he was overthrown and killed by Reginar on August 13, 900. The kingdom then ceased to exist and became a duchy.

== Stem Duchy of Lotharingia ==
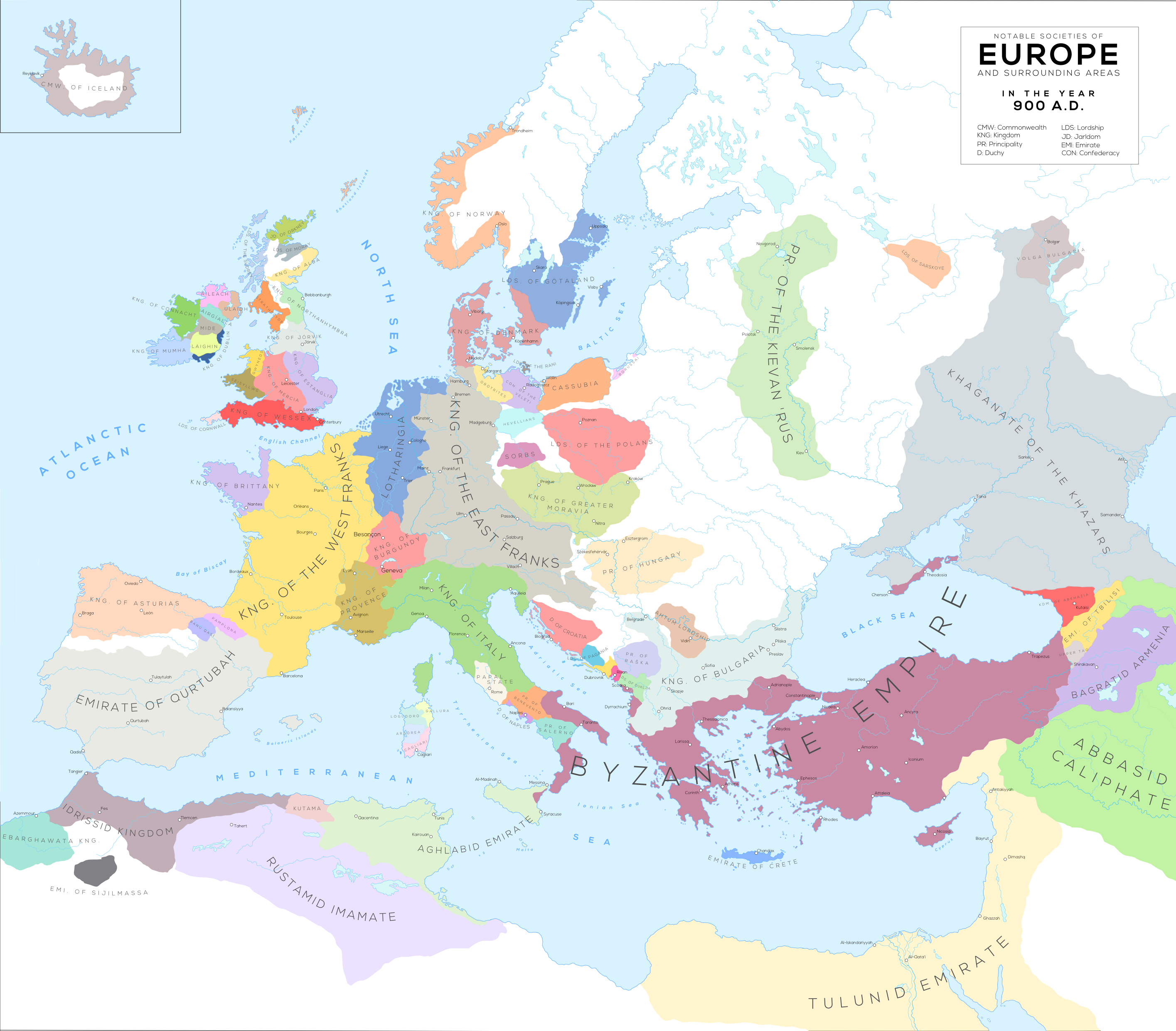
Europe in 900, showing Lotharingia and its neighbours

The young king of East Francia, Louis the Child, appointed Gebhard to be the duke of Lotharingia in 903. His title was recorded in contemporary Latin as dux regni quod a multis Hlotharii dicitur: "duke of the kingdom that many call Lothair's". He died in 910 fighting Hungarian invaders.

When non-Carolingian Conrad I of Germany was elected king of East Francia in 911, Lotharingian nobles under the new duke Reginar voted to attach their duchy to West Francia, still ruled by the Carolingian dynasty. In 915, Charles the Simple rewarded him by granting him the title of margrave. Reginar was succeeded by his son Gilbert who used the title dux Lotharingiae: "duke of Lotharingia".

When the West Franks deposed Charles in 922, he remained king in Lotharingia, from where he attempted to reconquer his kingdom in 923. He was captured and imprisoned by Heribert II of Vermandois until his death in 929. In 923, king Henry the Fowler of East Francia used this opportunity and invaded Lotharingia (including Alsace). In 925, Lotharingians under Gilbert elected Henry the Fowler to be their king. In 930, Gilbert's loyalty was rewarded and he received the prestigious hand of Henry's daughter Gerberga in marriage.

On Henry's death in 936, Gilbert rebelled and tried to swap Lotharingian allegiance to the West Franks, since their king Rudolph was weak and would interfere less in local affairs. In 939, Henry's son and successor, Otto I, Holy Roman Emperor, invaded Lotharingia, and at the Battle of Andernach defeated Gilbert, who drowned trying to flee across the Rhine.

The dukes of Lotharingia were thereafter royal appointees. Henry I, Duke of Bavaria was duke for two years, followed in 941 by duke Otto, who, in 944, was followed by Conrad. Lotharingia was turned into a junior stem duchy whose dukes had a vote in royal elections. While the other stem duchies had tribal or historic identities, Lotharingia's identity was solely political.

King Louis IV of West Francia tried to maintain a claim to Lotharingia by marrying Gilbert's widow and Otto's sister Gerberga. In his turn, Otto I accepted homage from West Francia's Hugh the Great and Herbert II, Count of Vermandois at Attigny in 942. The weak Louis IV had no choice but to agree to Otto's continued suzerainty over Lotharingia. In 944, West Francia invaded Lotharingia, but retreated after Otto I responded with mobilization of a large army under Herman I, Duke of Swabia.

In 953, Duke Conrad rebelled against Otto I, and was removed from power and replaced by Otto's brother Bruno the Great, who finally pacified Lotharingia.

== Partition of Lotharingia (959-965) ==
Lotharingia's division in 959 Blue: Alsace, ceded to Duchy of Swabia in 925 Orange: Upper Lotharingia after 928 Green: Lower Lotharingia after 977 Purple: Current state borders

Under the duke Bruno, who was also the Archbishop of Cologne, the Lotharingian duchy was administratively reorganized. That process was initiated in 959, by subdividing ducal governance into two distinctive jurisdictions, one for the Upper Lotharingia (Latin: Lotharingia superior), also known as the Southern Lotharingia, and the other for the Lower Lotharingia (Latin: Lotharingia inferior), also known as the Northern Lotharingia. Since Bruno continued to exercise ducal authority until his death in 965, the exact chronology of division and the nature of offices initially held by his deputies, duke Frederick I (in Upper Lotharingia), and duke Godfrey I (in Lower Lotharingia), are debated among modern scholars.

In 978, king Lothair of West Francia invaded the region and captured Aachen, but Otto II, Holy Roman Emperor, counterattacked and reached the walls of Paris. In 980, Lothair renounced his rights to Lotharingia.

== Later developments ==
Except for one brief period (1033–1044), when both duchies were held by the same person (duke Gothelo I), the division was never reversed and the local margraves soon aspired to raise their separate fiefs into duchies. In the twelfth century the ducal authority in Lower Lotharingia fragmented, causing the formation of the Duchy of Limburg and the Duchy of Brabant, whose rulers retained the title Duke of Lothier (derived from "Lotharingia"). With the disappearance of a "lower" Lotharingia, the remaining Duchy of Upper Lotharingia became the primary referent for Lotharingia (or "Lorraine") within the Holy Roman Empire.

After centuries of French invasions and temporary occupations, the younger Duchy of Lorraine was finally ceded to France at the close of the War of the Polish Succession (1737). In 1766, the duchy was inherited by the French crown and organized as a province, named Lorraine and Barrois. In 1871, after the Franco-Prussian War, the northern portions of Lorraine were merged with Alsace to become the province of Alsace-Lorraine in the German Empire, which became French territory again after World War I (1914-1918). Today the greater part of the French side of the Franco-German border belongs to the Grand Est, a region of France.

== See also ==
- List of rulers of Lotharingia (Lorraine)
- Duchy of Upper Lorraine
- Duchy of Lower Lorraine

== Bibliography ==
=== Primary sources ===
- Annales vedastini at The Latin Library.
- Annales xantenses qui dicuntur at The Latin Library.

=== Secondary sources ===
- Bachrach, David S. (2012). Warfare in Tenth-Century Germany. Woodbridge: The Boydell Press.
- Bartholomew, John, and Wakelyn Nightingale. Monasteries and Patrons in the Gorze Reform: Lotharingia c. 850–1000 (2001)
- Clark, Samuel. State and Status: The Rise of the State and Aristocratic Power in Western Europe (1995) pp. 53–79 excerpt
- Goldberg, Eric J. (2006). Struggle for Empire: Kingship and Conflict under Louis the German, 817-876. Ithaca, NY: Cornell University Press. ISBN 978-0-8014-3890-5.
- Leyser, Karl (1968). "Henry I and the Beginnings of the Saxon Empire". The English Historical Review. 83 (326): 1–32.
- MacLean, Simon (2003). Kingship and Politics in the Late Ninth Century: Charles the Fat and the end of the Carolingian Empire. New York: Cambridge University Press. ISBN 978-1-139-44029-5.
- MacLean, Simon (2013). "Shadow Kingdom: Lotharingia and the Frankish World, c. 850–c. 1050". History Compass. 11 (6): 443–457. doi:10.1111/hic3.12049. hdl:10023/4176.
- McKitterick, Rosamond (1983). The Frankish Kingdoms Under the Carolingians, 751-987. Harlow: Longman. ISBN 978-0-582-49005-5.
- Nelson, Janet L. (1996). The Frankish World, 750-900. London: The Hambledon Press.
- Reuter, Timothy (2013) [1991]. Germany in the Early Middle Ages c. 800–1056. London and New York: Routledge. ISBN 978-1-317-87239-9.
- Timothy Reuter, ed. The New Cambridge Medieval History, III: c. 900–c. 1024, Cambridge: Cambridge University Press, 2005. excerpts
- Reuter, Timothy (2006). Medieval Polities and Modern Mentalities. Cambridge: Cambridge University Press. ISBN 978-1-139-45954-9.
- Riché, Pierre (1993). The Carolingians: A Family Who Forged Europe. Philadelphia: University of Pennsylvania Press. ISBN 0-8122-1342-4.
- Schneider, Jens (2010). Auf der Suche nach dem verlorenen Reich: Lotharingien im 9. und 10. Jahrhundert. Köln: Böhlau Verlag.
- West, Charles (2023). The Fall of a Carolingian Kingdom: Lotharingia, 855–869. Toronto: University of Toronto Press. ISBN 978-1-4875-4518-5.
- Simon Winder, Lotharingia: A Personal History of Europe's Lost Country, Farrar, Straus, and Giroux, 2019.
