= Lower Burgundy =

Frankish kingdom from the 9th century to 933

- 879–933
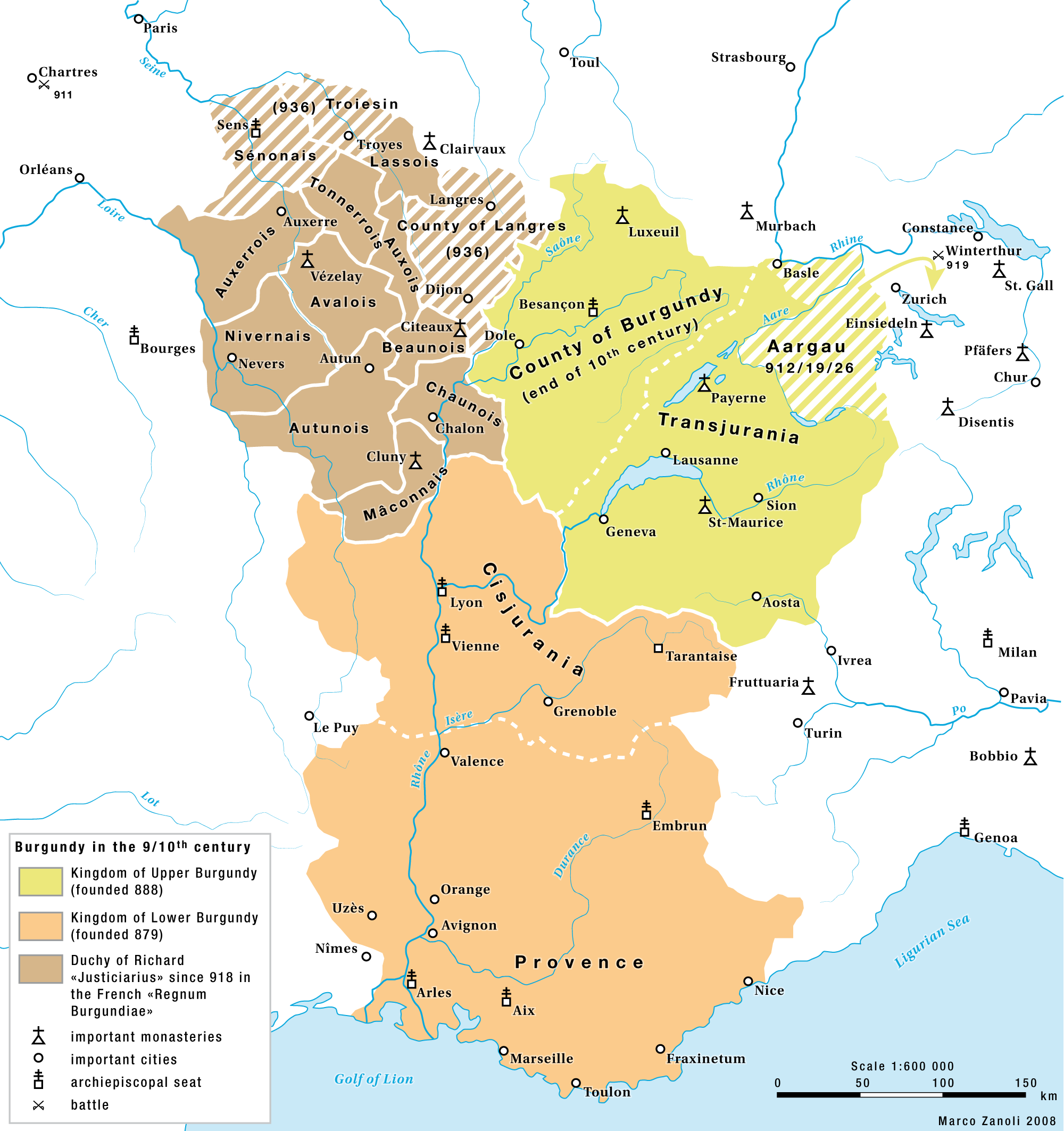
- Historical regions of the old Burgundy, c. 900. Lower Burgundy Upper Burgundy Duchy of Burgundy
- Common languages: Vulgar Latin; Old Occitan
- Government: Kingdom
- Historical era: Early Medieval
  - Established: 879
  - Disestablished: 933
Preceded by	Succeeded by
West Francia	Kingdom of Arles

Lower Burgundy (Latin: Burgundia inferior; French: Bourgogne inférieure) was a historical region in the early medieval Burgundy, and a distinctive realm known as the Kingdom of Lower Burgundy, that existed from 879 to 933, when it was incorporated into the reunited Kingdom of Burgundy. During that period, Lower Burgundy was encompassing the entire Cisjuran Burgundy (fr. Bourgogne cisjurane), centered on the region of Vienne (fr. Bourgogne viennoise), and also the entire southern region around Arles (fr. Bourgogne arlésienne), centered on Provence. The borders of Lower Burgundy were the region of Upper Burgundy to the north, the Kingdom of Italy to the east, the Mediterranean Sea to the south, Septimania to the southwest, and Aquitaine to the west.

== History ==
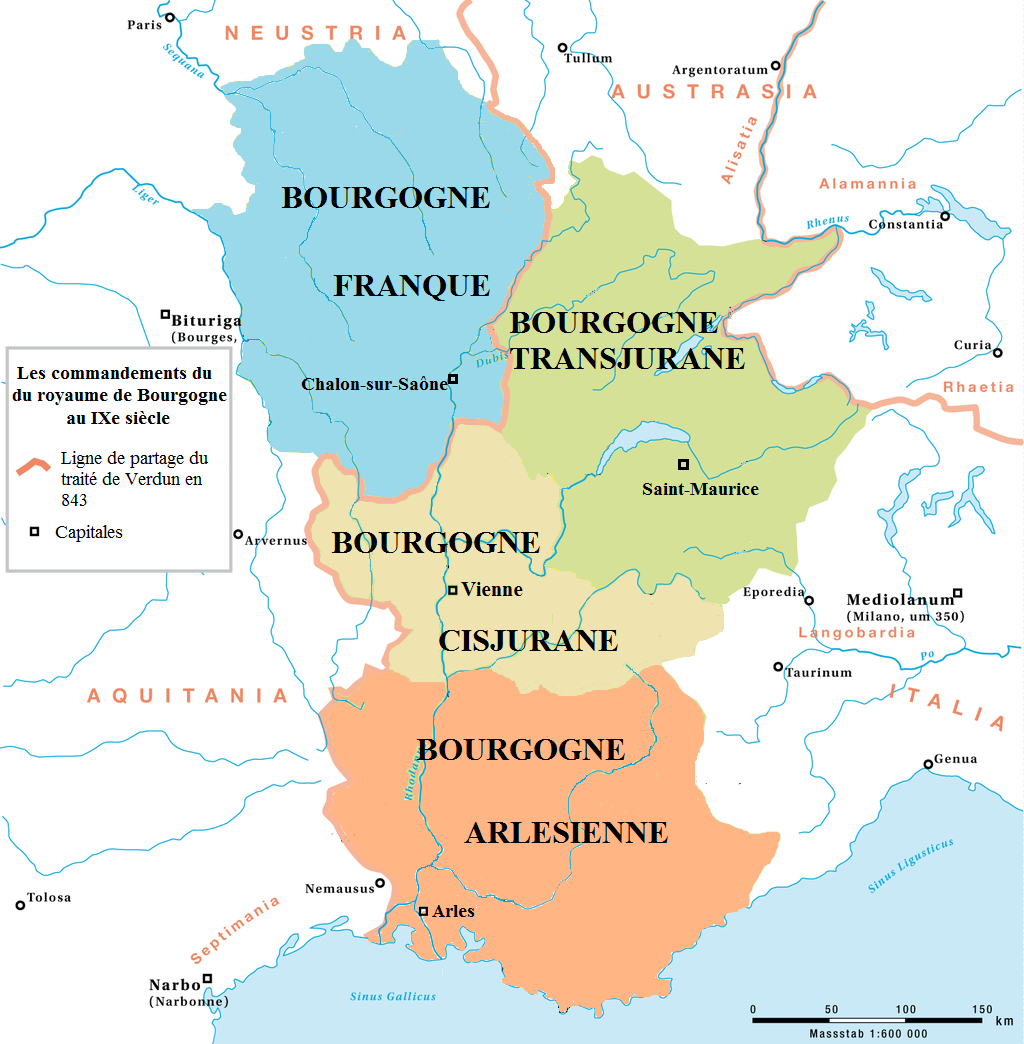
Main regions of historical Burgundy, with Lower Burgundy encompassing Cisjuran (light orange) and southern (orange) regions

By the Treaty of Prüm (19 September 855), the realm of Middle Francia was divided by three sons of Emperor Lothair I: the eldest, emperor Louis II, received Italy; the middle son, king Lothair II received Lotharingia (including Upper Burgundy); and the youngest, king Charles, received Lower Burgundy (including Provence). Thus, a distinctive Carolingian kingdom, centered on Lower Burgundy, was created. King Charles of Lower Burgundy died already in 863, and his realm was divided between his brothers.

In 869, king Lothair II died and almost all of his domains in Burgundy (both Upper and Lower) went to his brother Louis II, while the rest of Lothair′s realm was divided between Louis the German and Charles the Bald by the Treaty of Meerssen in 870. In 875, emperor Louis II died, and his domains in Burgundy (both Upper and Lower) went to Charles the Bald, thus being integrated into West Francia. In 877, king Charles was succeeded by his son Louis the Stammerer, who ruled over West Francia, including Burgundy.

King Louis of West Francia died in 879, and was succeeded by two minor sons, kings Louis III and Carloman II. Renounced allegiance to young kings, count Boso f Vienne claimed independence in order to carve up a realm of his own in Lower Burgundy, including Provence. On 15 October 879, several bishops and influential nobles of the region around the rivers Rhône and Saône assembled in the Synod of Mantaille and elected Boso as king, thus making him the first non-Carolingian king in Western Europe in more than a century.

The Kingdom of Lower Burgundy, known also as the Kingdom of Provence, comprised the ecclesiastical provinces of the archbishops of Arles, Aix, Vienne, Lyon (without Langres), and probably Besançon, as well as the dioceses of Tarentaise, Uzès, and Viviers.

Boso was an unsuccessful ruler and by 882 king Carloman of West Francia reintegrated much of the Lower Burgundy into the West Frankish realm, forcing Boso to retreat into his remaining Provencal domains. When king Carloman died in 884, emperor Charles the Fat expanded his rule over the entire West Frankish realm, which included much of the Lower Burgundy. In January 887, Boso died in Provence, and his claims were inherited by his son Louis, who was still a boy, and thus under guardianship of his mother, queen Ermengard, who appealed to emperor Charles and secured family possessions for her young son. Already in November 887, Arnulf of Carinthia deposed his uncle, emperor Charles, but queen Ermengard managed to preserve her son's possessions by appealing to the new king Arnulf.

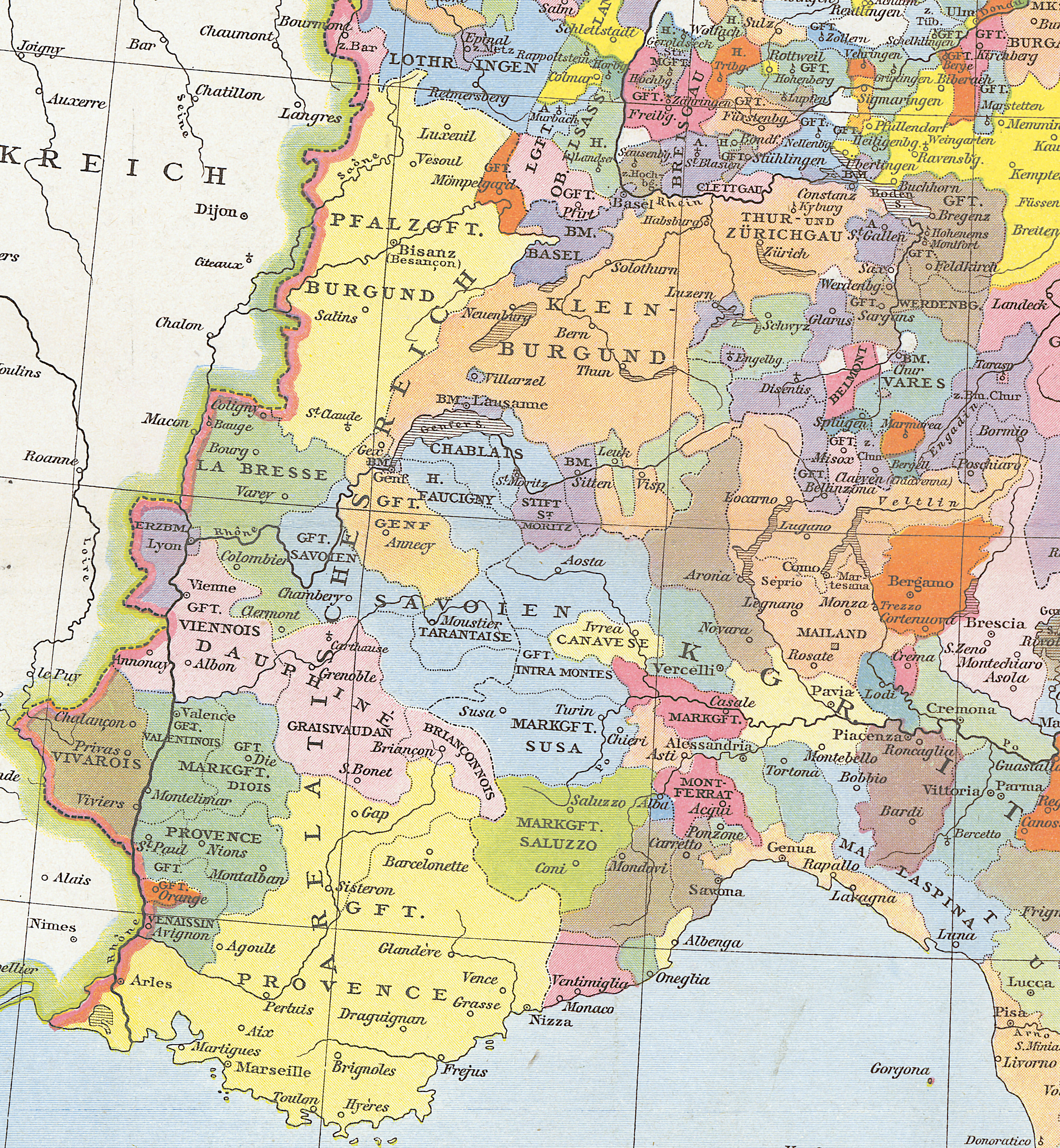
Feudal fragmentation in Burgundian lands during the 13th century

In 890, young Louis was old enough to be proclaimed as king. In the August of that year, at the Diet of Valence, a council of local and regional bishops and nobles proclaimed and crowned Louis as king in Lower Burgundy and Provence. In 900, king Louis (later called the Blind) was invited into Italy by Adalbert II of Tuscany who wished to keep Berengar of Friuli from gaining control of the Italian peninsula. Louis defeated Berengar and was crowned Holy Roman Emperor by Pope Benedict IV in 901. Berengar defeated Louis the next year, forced him to flee Italy and promise to never return. In 905, Louis again invaded Italy but was defeated and blinded for breaking his oath. Louis lost his titles of King of Italy and Holy Roman Emperor to Berengar.

Blinded, Louis made Hugh of Arles, the Count of Provence, his regent. Hugh was elected King of Italy in 924, and then spent the next two years ejecting his opponent, king Rudolph II of Upper Burgundy, from Italy. Louis died in 928 and was succeeded by Hugh. After failing to expand his power by a marriage to Marozia (the effective ruler of Rome), Hugh spent the next five years of his reign fighting Magyar raids and Andalusian pirates. In 932-933, Hugh made peace with Rudolph of Upper Burgundy by giving him the Lower Burgundy, and thus the two Burgundies were combined into the reunited Kingdom of Burgundy, also known from the 12th century as the Kingdom of Arles.

Within the Kingdom of Arles, the region of Lower Burgundy became fragmented into several feudal domains, both ecclesiastical and secular, one of them being known since the end of the 13th as the Dauphiné of Viennois.

== See also ==
- List of dukes, kings, counts, and margraves of Provence

== Sources ==
- Bouchard, Constance B. (1988). "The Bosonids or Rising to Power in the Late Carolingian Age". French Historical Studies. 15 (3): 407–431. doi:10.2307/286367. JSTOR 286367.
- Bouchard, Constance B. (1999). "Burgundy and Provence, 879–1032". The New Cambridge Medieval History. Vol. 3. Cambridge: Cambridge University Press. pp. 328–345.
- Hauff, Andrea (2017). "The Kingdom of Upper Burgundy and the East Frankish Kingdom at the beginning of the 10th century". History Compass. 15 (8): 1–12. doi:10.1111/hic3.12396.
- Kibler, William W.; Zinn, Grover A., eds. (2011) [1995]. Medieval France: An Encyclopedia. New York and London: Routledge.
- MacLean, Simon (2001). "The Carolingian response to the revolt of Boso, 879–887". French Historical Studies. 10 (1): 21–48. doi:10.1111/1468-0254.00078.
- MacLean, Simon (2003). Kingship and Politics in the Late Ninth Century: Charles the Fat and the end of the Carolingian Empire. New York: Cambridge University Press. ISBN 978-1-139-44029-5.
- McKitterick, Rosamond (1983). The Frankish Kingdoms Under the Carolingians, 751-987. Harlow: Longman. ISBN 978-0-582-49005-5.
- Riché, Pierre (1993). The Carolingians: A Family Who Forged Europe. Philadelphia: University of Pennsylvania Press.
- West, Charles (2023). The Fall of a Carolingian Kingdom: Lotharingia, 855–869. Toronto: University of Toronto Press. ISBN 978-1-4875-4518-5.
- Wickham, Chris (1981). Early Medieval Italy: Central Power and Local Society, 400-1000. Totowa, NJ: Barnes & Noble.
