= Schüller =

- Municipality
- Coat of arms

- Location of Schüller within Vulkaneifel district
- Interactive map of Schüller
- Location within Germany Location within Rhineland-Palatinate
- Coordinates: 50°20′6.42″N 6°34′20.61″E
- Country: Germany
- State: Rhineland-Palatinate
- District: Vulkaneifel
- Municipal assoc.: Gerolstein

Government
  - Mayor (2019–24): Guido Heinzen

Area
  - Total: 4.36 km^{2} (1.68 sq mi)
- Elevation: 564 m (1,850 ft)

Population (2025-12-31)
  - Total: 305
  - Density: 70.0/km^{2} (181/sq mi)
- Time zone: UTC+01:00 (CET)
  - Summer (DST): UTC+02:00 (CEST)
- Postal codes: 54586
- Dialling codes: 06597
- Vehicle registration: DAU
- Website: www.schueller-eifel.de

Schüller is an Ortsgemeinde – a municipality belonging to a Verbandsgemeinde, a kind of collective municipality – in the Vulkaneifel district in Rhineland-Palatinate, Germany. It belongs to the Verbandsgemeinde of Gerolstein, whose seat is in the municipality of Gerolstein.

== Geography ==
The municipality lies in the Vulkaneifel, a part of the Eifel known for its volcanic history, geographical and geological features, and even ongoing activity today, including gases that sometimes well up from the earth.

== History ==
The village’s beginnings apparently lie in a Roman military post named Scolinaria on a road leading from Steffeln by way of Glaadt to Cologne. It may well have been a forward post of the Roman castrum of Icorigium (now Jünkerath).

On 19 September 855, Schüller had its first documentary mention as Sconilare. It was the last document issued by Carolingian Emperor Lothair I, coming mere days before his death, and it dealt with the partition of his empire among his three sons.

Until the 14th century, there is hardly any mention of Schüller. In 1586, Schüller was supposedly held as a fief by the Lord of Schönberg and Hartelstein. Hugo Augustin von Schönberg pledged the village in 1609 to Count Arnold of Manderscheid-Blankenheim. In 1727, Schüller was under the Lordship of Kronenburg.

Following the 1795 Peace of Basel after the War of the First Coalition, Schüller passed to the French Department of Ourthe, but not long afterwards, in 1815, as a result of the War of the Sixth Coalition, it passed to Prussia.

Today, Schüller is a small, typical Eifel village; there is hardly any commercial activity and only the odd full-time farmer. Several artists, however, have come to live in the village, among others, Georg Meistermann.

== Politics ==
=== Municipal council ===
The council is made up of 8 council members, who were elected by majority vote at the municipal election held on 7 June 2009, and the honorary mayor as chairman.

=== Mayor ===
Schüller’s mayor is Guido Heinzen.

=== Coat of arms ===
The German blazon reads: Schild, neunfach von Silber und Blau geteilt, in der Mitte ein silberner Pfahl, darin ein aufgerichtetes, blaues Schwert mit goldenem Griff.

The municipality’s arms might in English heraldic language be described thus: Barry of ten argent and azure, a pale of the first upon which a sword of the second hilted Or, the point to chief.

Interesting here is that German heraldic terminology calls the field pattern neunfach … geteilt (“ninefold divided”) and English heraldic terminology calls it “barry of ten”.

== Culture and sightseeing ==
=== Buildings ===
- Saint Paul’s Catholic Parish Church (Pfarrkirche St. Paul), Kirchstraße 8 – Late Gothic Revival hall church, 1910, architect: F. Statz, Cologne.
- Near Kirchstraße 2 – wayside cross, post-Baroque shaft cross from 18(?; last two digits unclear).
