= Middle Francia =

State in Western Europe from 843 to 855

Kingdom of Middle Francia Francia media (Latin)
- 843–855
- Middle Francia in green
- Capital: Aachen
- Official languages: Medieval Latin
- Common languages: Old Dutch; Old Frisian; Old Gallo-Romance; Old Occitan; Old Low German; Old High German
- Religion: Chalcedonian Christianity (under the jurisdiction of the Church of Rome) (official); Germanic religion
- Government: Monarchy
- King
  - 843–855: Lothair I (first and last)
- Historical era: Middle Ages
  - Treaty of Verdun: 843
  - Treaty of Prüm: 855

Area
  - Total: 350,000 km^{2} (140,000 sq mi)
- Currency: Denier
Preceded by
Francia
Succeeded by
Kingdom of Italy
Kingdom of Provence
Lotharingia

Middle Francia (Latin: Francia media) was a short-lived Frankish kingdom which was created in 843 by the Treaty of Verdun, which ended nearly three years of civil war among the surviving sons of Louis the Pious, son of Charlemagne, and divided the Carolingian Empire in three kingdoms. Middle Francia was allocated to Lothair I, the eldest of the three sons.

Middle Francia ceased to exist as a unified kingdom when Lothair I divided it among his sons under the Treaty of Prüm, shortly before his death in 855. Louis II received Italy and the imperial title, Charles received the southern territories centred on Provence, and Lothair II received the northern kingdom, which later became known as Lotharingia. None of the three sons left a legitimate male heir. The territories of the former Middle Francia were thus progressively redistributed, which allowed West Francia and East Francia to claim them. This should not be taken to mean that its eventual disappearance was predetermined by a lack of geographic or cultural cohesion.

== Geography ==
Division of the Carolingian Empire under the Treaty of Prüm (855)

Middle Francia was situated between the realms of East and West Francia and comprised the Frankish territory between the rivers Rhine and Scheldt, the Frisian coast of the North Sea, the former Kingdom of Burgundy (except for a western portion, later known as Bourgogne) and Provence, as well as northern Italy, through which the Frankish kingdom had access to the Ligurian Sea, and from the Gulf of Lion in the west through Provence and on to the Adriatic Sea to the east, through (modern-day) Veneto. The territory occupied around 300,000 to 350,000 km^{2} (120,000 to 140,000 sq mi).

Division of domains of Charles of Provence between his brothers in 863

The geographical situation of Middle Francia was unprivileged in comparison to its neighbours West and East Francia. This is due to the position of the kingdom in Europe. Its only major borders were with East and West Francia; the rest of its borders were isolated and very small in comparison. The only borders it shared with other states at the time were with the Papal States of Benevento and Venice, which were relatively new states without a culture of trade or development. This prevented Middle Francia from trading with other states such as Byzantium or Bulgaria. In addition, its position in Europe could compromise its sovereignty. If any of its neighbouring states, especially West or East Francia, decided to attack Middle Francia, its borders could not be defended due to their length; this is essentially what happened in the Treaty of Meerssen.

== Partition of 855 ==
Division of the Carolingian Empire under the Treaty of Meerssen in 870

In 855 on his deathbed at Prüm Abbey, Emperor Lothair I with the Treaty of Prüm divided Middle Francia among his three sons. The lands in northern Italy, which extended as far south as Rome and Spoleto, were left to the eldest son Louis II the Younger, crowned co-emperor in 850 and sole emperor from 855. This eventually became the Kingdom of Italy. Most of the lands north of the Alps, comprising the Low Countries, the western Rhineland, the lands today on the border between France and Germany, and what is now western Switzerland, passed to Lothair II and were called Lotharingia, after its ruler. Charles of Provence received the Kingdom of Burgundy (Upper Burgundy and Lower Burgundy) and Provence.

== Later partitions ==
Charles died without sons in 863. According to Frankish custom, his brothers Louis II and Lothair II divided his realm. Lothair II received the western Lower Burgundian parts (bishoprics of Lyon, Vienne, Vivarais and Uzès) which were bordering his western Upper Burgundy (remnants of his original Burgundian possessions) which were incorporated into Lotharingia; while Louis II received Provence.

When Lothair II died in 869, his only son Hugh by his mistress Waldrada was declared illegitimate, so his only legal heir was his brother Louis II. If Louis II had inherited Lotharingia, Middle Francia would have been reunited. However, as Louis II was at that time campaigning against the Emirate of Bari, Lotharingia was partitioned between his uncles Charles the Bald and Louis the German by the Treaty of Meerssen in 870. Louis the German took Upper Burgundy, territory north of the Jura mountains (Bourgogne Transjurane), while the rest went to Charles the Bald.

In 875 Louis II died without sons and named as his successor in Italy his cousin Carloman of Bavaria, eldest son of Louis the German. However, Pope John VIII, dealing with the constant threat of raiders from the Emirate of Sicily, sided with Charles the Bald. After much confusion and conflict, Charles the Bald took Louis' realm in Italy. Carloman was crowned king of Bavaria in 876 and invaded Italy in 877 to claim the Kingdom of Italy, but on his death in 880 without any legitimate heirs, his kingdom went to his younger brother, King Charles the Fat. Charles was crowned emperor by Pope John VIII in 881, and thus he reunited the entire Carolingian Empire in 884, although it lasted only until Charles' overthrow in 887.

== See also ==
- Lotharingia
- History of Burgundy
- History of Italy
- History of Provence

== Sources ==
- Goldberg, Eric J. (2006). Struggle for Empire: Kingship and Conflict under Louis the German, 817-876. Ithaca, NY: Cornell University Press.
- MacLean, Simon (2003). Kingship and Politics in the Late Ninth Century: Charles the Fat and the end of the Carolingian Empire. New York: Cambridge University Press.
- MacLean, Simon (2013). "Shadow Kingdom: Lotharingia and the Frankish World, c. 850–c. 1050". History Compass. 11 (6): 443–457.
- McKitterick, Rosamond (1983). The Frankish Kingdoms Under the Carolingians, 751-987. Harlow: Longman.
- Nelson, Janet L. (1996). The Frankish World 750-900. London and Rio Grande: The Hambledon Press.
- Nelson, Janet L. (2019). King and Emperor: A New Life of Charlemagne. Oakland: University of California Press.
- Reuter, Timothy (2013) [1991]. Germany in the Early Middle Ages c. 800–1056. London and New York: Routledge. ISBN 978-1-317-87239-9.
- Reuter, Timothy (2006). Medieval Polities and Modern Mentalities. Cambridge: Cambridge University Press.
- Riché, Pierre (1993). The Carolingians: A Family Who Forged Europe. Philadelphia: University of Pennsylvania Press. ISBN 0-8122-1342-4.
- Schneider, Jens (2010). Auf der Suche nach dem verlorenen Reich: Lotharingien im 9. und 10. Jahrhundert. Köln: Böhlau Verlag.
- Schutz, Herbert (2004). The Carolingians in Central Europe, Their History, Arts, and Architecture: A Cultural History of Central Europe, 750-900. Leiden-Boston: Brill.
- West, Charles (2023). The Fall of a Carolingian Kingdom: Lotharingia, 855–869. Toronto: University of Toronto Press.
- Engreen, Fred E. (1945). "Pope John the Eighth and the Arabs". Speculum. 20 (3): 318–330. doi:10.2307/2854614. JSTOR 2854614. S2CID 154749195.
