= Synod of Mantaille =

The Synod of Mantaille was held in the southwestern French region of Provence, on 15 October 879 by the bishops and nobles of the region around the rivers Rhône and Saône. They elected Boso of Provence, Count of Vienne, as successor to king Louis II of France, dead since April. Boso realm became known as Lower Burgundy. The synod marks the first occurrence of a "free election" among the Franks, without regard to royal descent, inspired by the principles of ecclesiastical elections.
