= Charles of Provence =

Ruler of Provence and Lower Burgundy from 855 to 863

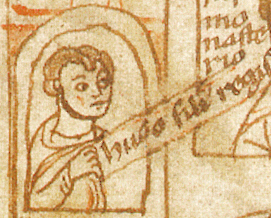
King Charles, ruler of Provence and Lower Burgundy (855–863)

Charles of Provence or Charles of Burgundy (845 – 25 January 863) was a Carolingian king and ruler of Provence and Lower Burgundy from 855 until his early death in 863.

Division of the Carolingian Empire under the Treaty of Prüm (855)

Charles was the youngest son of Emperor Lothair I and Ermengarde of Tours.

By the Treaty of Prüm (19 September 855) his father divided Middle Francia between his three sons: the eldest, Louis, received Italy and the emperorship; Lothair II received Lotharingia (modern Lorraine, the Low Countries, and Upper Burgundy); and the youngest, Charles, received Lower Burgundy with Provence.

Charles was only a child when his father died; and the governance of his realm was undertaken by his tutor, Count Girart de Roussillon, whose wife had been a sister-in-law of Lothar I. Girart was a vigorous regent, defending the kingdom from the Northmen, who raided up the Rhone as far as Valence.

Charles' uncle Charles the Bald attempted to intervene in Provence in 861. After receiving an appeal for intervention from the count of Arles, he invaded Provence, but only reached Macon, being restrained by Hincmar of Rheims.

Charles of Provence never ruled his realm in anything more than name. It was Girart, rather than Charles, who in 858 arranged that should Charles die without children, Provence would revert to Charles' brother Lothair. However, when Charles died, his elder brother Louis also claimed Provence, so the realm was divided between the two: Lothair received the bishoprics of Lyon, Vienne and Grenoble, to be governed by Girart; Louis received Arles, Aix and Embrun.

== See also ==
Division of Charles' domains upon his death in 863

- History of Provence
- History of Burgundy

== Sources ==
- Goldberg, Eric J. (2006). Struggle for Empire: Kingship and Conflict under Louis the German, 817-876. Ithaca, NY: Cornell University Press. ISBN 978-0-8014-3890-5.
- Nelson, Janet L. (2019). King and Emperor: A New Life of Charlemagne. Oakland: University of California Press. ISBN 978-0-520-31420-7.
- Reuter, Timothy (2013) [1991]. Germany in the Early Middle Ages c. 800–1056. London and New York: Routledge. ISBN 978-1-317-87239-9.
- Schutz, Herbert (2004). The Carolingians in Central Europe, Their History, Arts, and Architecture: A Cultural History of Central Europe, 750-900. Leiden-Boston: Brill. ISBN 90-04-13149-3.

Charles of Provence Carolingian dynasty Born: 845 Died: January 863
Regnal titles
Preceded by Lothar I as King of Middle Francia	King of Provence; 23 September 855 – January 863	Divided between Emperor Louis II and Lothair II of Lotharingia
