= East Francia =

Country in Western Europe (843–962)

Kingdom of the East Franks (Franks of the East) Regnum Francorum orientalium (Latin)
- 843–962
- East Francia in 843 after the Treaty of Verdun
- Capital: Various, including Frankfurt and Ratisbon (Regensburg)
- Common languages: Medieval Latin; Old High German; Old Low German; Old Frisian; Slavic languages
- Religion: Chalcedonian Christianity (under the jurisdiction of the Church of Rome); Germanic religion
- Demonym: East Frankish • East Frank
- Government: Monarchy
- King
  - 843–876: Louis the German (first)
  - 936–962 (title held until his death in 973): Otto the Great
- Historical era: Middle Ages
  - Treaty of Verdun: 843
  - Treaty of Meerssen: 870
  - Disestablished: 962
- Currency: Pfennig
Preceded by	Succeeded by
Francia; Carolingian Empire	Holy Roman Empire; Kingdom of Germany

East Francia (Latin: Francia orientalis) or the Kingdom of the East Franks (Regnum Francorum orientalium) was a successor state of the Carolingian Empire ruled by the Carolingian dynasty until 911. It was established through the 843 Treaty of Verdun which divided the former kingdom of Francia into three kingdoms: Francia Orientalis (the East Frankish kingdom); Francia Media (the Middle Frankish kingdom); and Francia Occidentalis (the West Frankish kingdom).

The east–west division with the Treaty of Verdun, enforced by the Germanic-Latin language split, "gradually hardened into the establishment of separate kingdoms", with East Francia becoming (or being) the Kingdom of Germany, and West Francia becoming the Kingdom of France.

== Terminology ==
The term "Francia", land of the Franks (also known as the "Kingdom of the Franks"), was commonly used to refer to the empire. The ruling dynasty was Frankish, although its inhabitants were mostly non-Frankish Germanic tribes. The Kingdom of Germany was mostly Germanic-speaking East Francia, especially after the kingship passed from Frankish kings to the Saxon Ottonian dynasty in 919.

The term orientalis Francia originally referred to Franconia and orientales Franci to its inhabitants, the ethnic Franks living east of the Rhine. The use of the term in a broader sense, to refer to the eastern kingdom, was an innovation of Louis the German's court. Since eastern Francia could be identified with old Austrasia, the Frankish heartland, Louis's choice of terminology hints at his ambitions. Under his grandson Arnulf of Carinthia the terminology was largely dropped, and the kingdom was simply known as Francia.

When it was necessary, as in the 921 Treaty of Bonn with the West Franks, the "eastern" qualifier appeared. Henry I refers to himself as rex Francorum orientalium, "king of the East Franks", in the treaty. By the 12th century, historian Otto of Freising in using the Carolingian terminology, had to explain that the "eastern kingdom of the Franks" (orientale Francorum regnum) was "now called the kingdom of the Germans" (regnum Teutonicorum).

== History ==
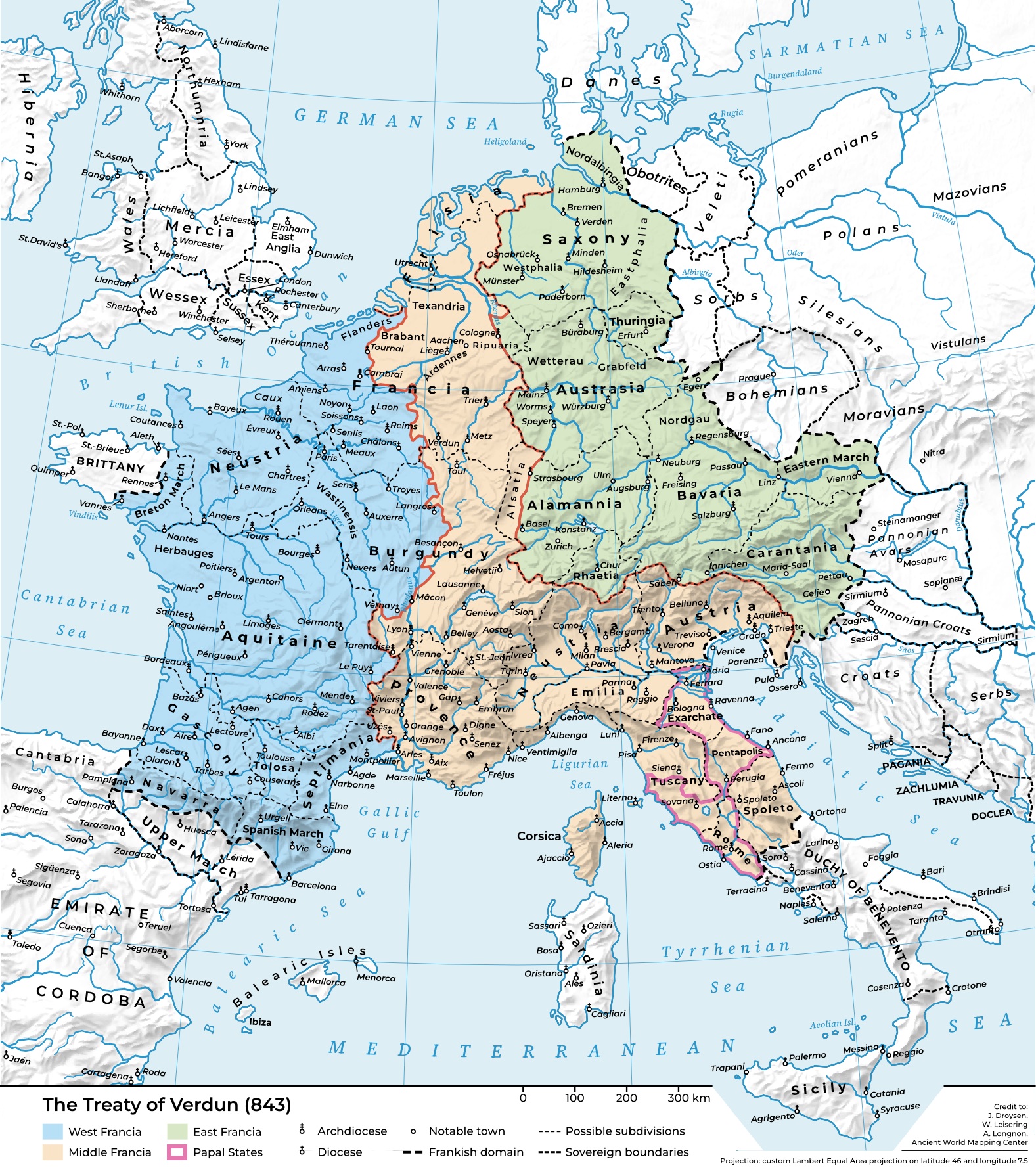
Division of the Carolingian Empire after the Treaty of Verdun in 843

In August 843, after three years of civil war following the death of Emperor Louis the Pious on 20 June 840, the Treaty of Verdun was signed by his three sons and heirs. The division of lands was largely based on the Meuse, Scheldt, Saone and Rhone rivers. While the eldest son Lothair I kept the imperial title and the kingdom of Middle Francia, Charles the Bald received West Francia, and Louis the German received the eastern portion of mostly Germanic-speaking lands: the Duchy of Saxony, Austrasia, Alamannia, the Duchy of Bavaria, and the March of Carinthia.

The contemporary East Frankish Annales Fuldenses describes the kingdom being "divided in three" and Louis "acceding to the eastern part". The West Frankish Annales Bertiniani describes the extent of Louis's lands: "at the assigning of portions, Louis obtained all the land beyond the Rhine river, but on this side of the Rhine also the cities of Speyer, Worms and Mainz with their counties". The kingdom of West Francia went to Charles the Bald, and between their realms a kingdom of Middle Francia, incorporating Italy, was given to Lothair.

While East Francia contained about a third of Austrasia, the rest consisted mostly of lands annexed to the Frankish empire between the 5th and the 8th century. These included the duchies of Alamannia, Bavaria, Saxony and Thuringia, as well as the northern and eastern marches with the Danes and Slavs. Contemporary chronicler Regino of Prüm writes that the "different people" (diversae nationes populorum) of East Francia, mostly Germanic- and Slavic-speaking, could be "distinguished from each other by race, customs, language and laws" (genere moribus lingua legibus).

In 869, Lotharingia was divided between West and East Francia under the Treaty of Meerssen. The short lived Middle Francia turned out to be the theatre of Franco-German wars up until the 20th century. All the Frankish lands were briefly reunited by Charles the Fat, but in 888 he was deposed by nobles, and in East Francia Arnulf of Carinthia was elected king. The increasing weakness of royal power in East Francia meant that dukes of Bavaria, Swabia, Franconia, Saxony and Lotharingia turned from appointed nobles into hereditary rulers of their territories. Kings increasingly had to deal with regional rebellions.

In 911 Saxon, Franconian, Bavarian and Swabian nobles no longer followed the tradition of electing someone from the Carolingian dynasty as a king to rule over them, and on 10 November 911 elected one of their own (Conrad I) as king. Because Conrad was one of the dukes, he found it very hard to establish his authority over them. Duke Henry of Saxony was in rebellion against Conrad until 915, and struggle against Arnulf, Duke of Bavaria, cost Conrad his life. On his deathbed, Conrad chose Henry as the most capable successor. This kingship changed from Franks to Saxons, who had suffered greatly during the conquests of Charlemagne. Henry, who was elected to kingship by only Saxons and Franconians at Fritzlar, had to subdue other dukes and concentrated on creating a state apparatus which was fully utilized by his son and successor Otto I. By his death in 936, Henry had prevented collapse of royal power, as was happening in West Francia, and he left a much stronger kingdom to Otto. After Otto was crowned Emperor in Rome in 962, the era of the Holy Roman Empire began.

== Kingship ==
Division of the Carolingian Empire after the Treaty of Meerssen in 870

The regalia of the Carolingian Empire had been divided by Louis the Pious on his deathbed between his two faithful sons, Charles the Bald and Lothair I. Louis the German, then in rebellion, received nothing of the crown jewels or liturgical books associated with Carolingian kingship. Thus the symbols and rituals of East Frankish kingship were created from scratch.

From an early date, the East Frankish kingdom had a more formalised notion of royal election than West Francia. Around 900, a liturgy for the coronation of a king, called the early German ordo, was written for a private audience. It required the coronator to ask the "designated prince" (princeps designatus) whether he was willing to defend the church and the people and then to turn and ask the people whether they were willing to be subject to the prince and obey his laws. The latter then shouted, "Fiat, fiat!" (Let it be done!), an act that later became known as "Recognition". This is the earliest known coronation ordo with a Recognition in it, and it was subsequently incorporated in the influential Pontificale Romano-Germanicum.

In June 888, King Arnulf convened a council at Mainz. In attendance were the three archbishops of East Francia—Wilbert of Cologne, Liutbert of Mainz and Ratbod of Trier—and West Francia archbishops of Reims (Fulk) and Rouen (John I) along with the bishops of Beauvais and Noyon. According to Walter Ullmann, the presence of the West Franks was on account of the "barren ecclesiastical thought" of the East, and the council proceeded to adopt West Frankish ideas of royal sacrality and anointing. It was "the first phase in the process of assimilation of the two halves of the Carolingian inheritance". In another church council at Tribur in 895, the prelates declared that Arnulf was chosen by God and not by men and Arnulf in turn swore to defend the church and its privileges from all its enemies. When Arnulf died in 899, his minor son Louis IV was crowned but not anointed, and placed under the tutelage of Archbishop Hatto I of Mainz. Louis's coronation was the first in German history. When Louis died in 911, Duke Conrad I, then the Duke of Franconia, was elected to replace him on 10 November and he became the first German king to receive unction.

== Church ==
The three basic services monasteries could owe to the sovereign in the Frankish realms were military service, an annual donation of money or work, and prayers for the royal family and the kingdom. Collectively, these were known by the technical term servitium regis ("king's service"). According to the evidence of the Notitia de servitio monasteriorum, a list of monasteries and the services they owed drawn up around 817, the burden of military and monetary service was more severe in West Francia than in East Francia. Only four monasteries listed as "beyond the Rhine" (ultra Rhenum) owed these services: Lorsch, Schuttern, Mondsee and Tegernsee.

== List of kings ==
Carolingian dynasty:

- Louis the German (843–876)
- Divided
  - Carloman in Bavaria (876–879)
  - Louis the Younger in Saxony (876–882) and Bavaria (879–882)
  - Charles the Fat in Alemannia (876–882)
- Charles the Fat (882–887)
- Arnulf of Carinthia (887–899)
- Louis the Child (900–911)

Conradine dynasty:

- Conrad I of Germany (911–918)

Ottonian dynasty:

- Henry the Fowler (919–936)
- Otto the Great (936–973)

== See also ==
- List of Frankish kings
- List of German monarchs
