= Timothy Reuter =

German-British historian (1947–2002)

Professor Timothy Reuter FRHistS
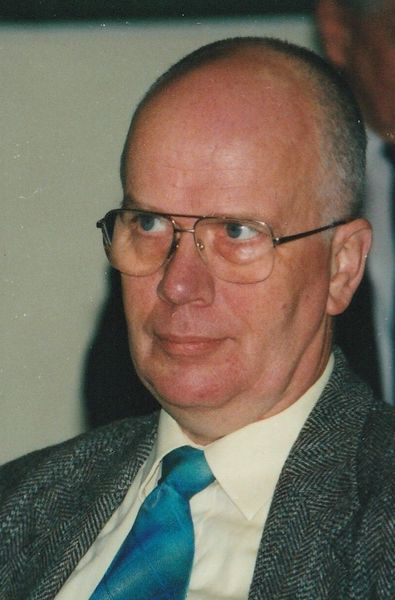
- Born: Timothy Alan Reuter; 25 January 1947; Manchester, England
- Died: 14 October 2002 (aged 55)
- Occupations: Historian and academic

Academic background
- Education: Royal Grammar School, Newcastle upon Tyne
- Alma mater: University of Cambridge (MA); University of Oxford (DPhil)
- Thesis: The papal schism, the Empire and the West, 1159-1169 (1975)
- Doctoral advisor: Karl Leyser

Academic work
- Institutions: University of Exeter; Monumenta Germaniae Historica; University of Southampton

Timothy Alan Reuter (25 January 1947 – 14 October 2002), grandson of the former mayor of Berlin Ernst Reuter, was a German-British historian who specialized in the study of medieval Germany, particularly the social, military and ecclesiastical institutions of the Ottonian and Salian periods (10th–12th centuries).

Born in Manchester, Reuter attended a grammar school in Newcastle and studied at Cambridge University. Reuter then pursued his D.Phil. at Oxford University in medieval history under the supervision of Karl Leyser (d. 1992), another leading Anglophone scholar of German history. After a ten years lecturing at the University of Exeter, Reuter spent more than a decade as a Mitarbeiter (academic staff member) at the Monumenta Germaniae Historica in Munich, where he worked on editing the letters of the twelfth-century abbot Wibald of Corvey and (with Dr. Gabriel Silagi) produced the database for a concordance to the work of the medieval canonist Gratian.

In 1994, Reuter was appointed to a professorship at the University of Southampton, where he remained until his death in 2002. At Southampton, he headed a number of educational and research initiatives that promoted medieval history and scholarship.

In addition Reuter served as a liaison between the worlds of Anglo-American and German medieval studies. Among his contributions in this area were numerous book reviews in German and British publications, a translation of Gerd Tellenbach's monograph on the history of the church in the High Middle Ages (The Church in Western Europe from the tenth to the early twelfth century, Cambridge, 1993) and the posthumous editing and publishing of his mentor Karl Leyser's papers (Communications and Power in Medieval Europe, 2 vols., Hambledon & London, 1992). His own monograph, Germany in the Early Middle Ages, 800–1056 (Harlow, Essex & New York, 1991) remains a standard English-language survey of the subject.

At the time of his death of brain cancer, Reuter was working on a history of the medieval episcopacy. His collected papers are posthumously published as Medieval Polities and Modern Mentalities (Cambridge, 2006). In 2004 the University of Southampton established the annual Reuter Lecture in his memory.

The collection Challenging the Boundaries of Medieval History: The Legacy of Timothy Reuter, edited by Patricia Skinner, was published in 2009 as volume 22 in the University of York Studies in the Early Middle Ages (Brepols, Turnhout, Belgium).

== Main works ==
- Reuter, Timothy (1992). The Annals of Fulda. Manchester: Manchester University Press. ISBN 9780719034589.
- Reuter, Timothy (2013) [1991]. Germany in the Early Middle Ages c. 800–1056. London and New York: Routledge. ISBN 9781317872399.
