= Timeline of Dijon =

The following is a timeline of the history of the city of Dijon, France.

== Prior to 20th century ==
- c.274 - Roman emperor Aurelian surrounds the town with ramparts.
- c.500 – Battle of Dijon
- c.580 – Description of Dijon by Gregory of Tours in Historia Francorum (Book III, Chapter 19).
- 1098 – Cîteaux Abbey founded near Dijon.
- 1137 – Fire accident.
- 1182 - Hugh III, Duke of Burgundy confers communal privileges on the town.
- 1183 - Philip II of France confirms the communal privileges.
- 1200 – Dijon mustard introduced (approximate date).
- 1334 - Church of Notre-Dame of Dijon consecrated.
- 1364 - Dijon City Hall built.
- 1382 - Public clock installed.
- 1383 - Carthusian Champmol monastery founded near Dijon.
- 1393 - Dijon Cathedral consecrated.
- 1405 - "Well of Moses" sculpture created for the Champmol monastery near Dijon.
- 1460 – Tower of Philip the Good built.
- 1491 – Printing press in operation.
- 1513 – Siege of Dijon by 50,000 Swiss and Germans.
- 1595 - The town opened is gates to Henry IV of France
- 1683 - Birth of Jean-Philippe Rameau, later a composer and music theorist.
- 1689 – Salle des États at the Palace of the Dukes of Burgundy completed.
- 1708 – Public library opens.^{(fr)}
- 1709 – St. Anne's Church, Dijon built.
- 1722 – University of Dijon founded.
- 1731 – Roman Catholic diocese of Dijon established.
- 1740 – Académie des Sciences, Arts et Belles-Lettres de Dijon constituted.
- 1763 – Jesuits expelled.
- 1784 - Birth of François Rude, later a sculptor.
- 1787 – Musée des Beaux-Arts de Dijon established.
- 1790 – Dijon becomes part of the Côte-d'Or department.
- 1793 – Population: 20,760.
- 1802 – Sainte-Chapelle de Dijon demolished.
- 1828 – Grand Theatre built.
- 1832 – Burgundy Canal and Port du canal de Dijon open.
- 1833 – Jardin botanique de l'Arquebuse (garden) established.
- 1858 – Dijon Exhibition held.
- 1863 – Hostellerie du Chapeau Rouge in business.
- 1868 – Le Bien Public newspaper in publication.
- 1870 – October: Battle of Dijon.
- 1879 – Dijon Synagogue built.
- 1886 – Population: 60,855.
- 1893 – Lycée Carnot (Dijon) (school) opens.
- 1899 – Carnot monument erected in the Place de la République (Dijon).

== 20th century ==
- 1911 – Population: 76,847.
- 1914 – Cinéma Le Darcy opens.
- 1920 – Cinéma Eldorado opens.
- 1934 – Stade Gaston Gérard (stadium) opens.
- 1938 – Magnin Museum established.
- 1946 – Population: 100,664.
- 1947 – Rude Museum established.
- 1956 – Dijon exhibition grounds opens.
- 1962 – Gare de Dijon-Ville rebuilt.
- 1970 – University of Burgundy established.
- 1973 - Canton de Dijon-1, etc. created.
- 1975 – Population: 151,705.
- 1977 – Palais des Sports de Dijon (arena) opens.
- 1980
  - Florissimo flower show begins.
  - Musée d'art sacré de Dijon opens.
- 1981 – Hôtel de région (Bourgogne) built in Dijon for the Bourgogne regional council.^{(fr)}
- 1990 – Parc de la Toison d'Or (amusement park) opens.
- 1995 – Festival international du court-métrage de Dijon begins.
- 1998
  - Dijon Auditorium opens.
  - Dijon FCO football club formed.

== 21st century ==
- 2003 – May: Socialist Party national congress held in Dijon.
- 2005 – Zénith de Dijon assembly hall opens.
- 2009 – Elithis tower office building constructed.
- 2010 – November: Hostel fire.
- 2012
  - Dijon tramway begins operating.
  - Population: 152,071.
- 2014
  - March: Dijon municipal election, 2014 held.
  - 21 December: 2014 Dijon attack.
- 2015
  - François Rebsamen becomes mayor.
  - December: Bourgogne-Franche-Comté regional election, 2015 held.
- 2016 – Dijon becomes part of the Bourgogne-Franche-Comté region.
- 2020 – 11–17 June: 2020 Dijon riots

== See also ==
- Dijon history
- List of mayors of Dijon
- List of heritage sites in Dijon
- History of Burgundy region

other cities in the Bourgogne-Franche-Comté region

- Timeline of Besançon

== Bibliography ==
=== in English ===
- Clement Cruttwell (1793). "Dijon". Gazetteer of France. London: G.G.J. and J. Robinson. hdl:2027/njp.32101072026808.
- "Dijon", Handbook for travellers in France, London: John Murray, 1861
- William Henry Overall, ed. (1870). "Dijon". Dictionary of Chronology. London: William Tegg. hdl:2027/uc2.ark:/13960/t9m32q949.
- C.B. Black (1876), "Dijon", Guide to the north of France, Edinburgh: Adam and Charles Black
- "Dijon", Northern France, Leipsic: Karl Baedeker, 1899, OCLC 2229516
- "Dijon", Jewish Encyclopedia, vol. 4, New York, 1907, hdl:2027/osu.32435029752912
- "Dijon" . Encyclopædia Britannica. Vol. 8 (11th ed.). 1910. pp. 269–270.
- Benjamin Vincent (1910), "Dijon", Haydn's Dictionary of Dates (25th ed.), London: Ward, Lock & Co., hdl:2027/loc.ark:/13960/t89g6g776
- Trudy Ring, ed. (1995). "Dijon". Northern Europe. International Dictionary of Historic Places. Fitzroy Dearborn. ISBN 978-1-136-63944-9.

=== in French ===
- Almanach de la province de Bourgogne et particulièrement de la ville de Dijon (in French). 1772. pp. 20 v.
- "Dijon". Almanach général des marchands, négocians, armateurs et fabricans (in French). Paris: L. Cellot. 1779. ISSN 1954-6521.
- Jean-Baptiste-Joseph Champagnac [in French] (1839). "Dijon". Manuel des dates, en forme de dictionnaire (in French). Perisse frères.
- Eusèbe Girault de Saint-Fargeau [in French] (1850). "Dijon". Guide pittoresque: portatif et complet, du voyageur en France (in French) (3rd ed.). Paris: Firmin Didot frères. p. 342. hdl:2027/uiug.30112081968700.
- Philibert Milsand (1885). "Ville de Dijon". Bibliographie bourguignonne. Dijon: Gustave Lamarche; Académie des Sciences, Arts et Belles-Lettres de Dijon.
- Dijon. Guides Joanne (in French). Hachette. hdl:2027/hvd.32044087927356. circa 1896
- "Dijon". La Bourgogne. À la France: sites et monuments (in French). Paris: Touring-Club de France. 1906. OCLC 457600236.
