= History of Burgundy =

Occurrences and people in Burgundy throughout history

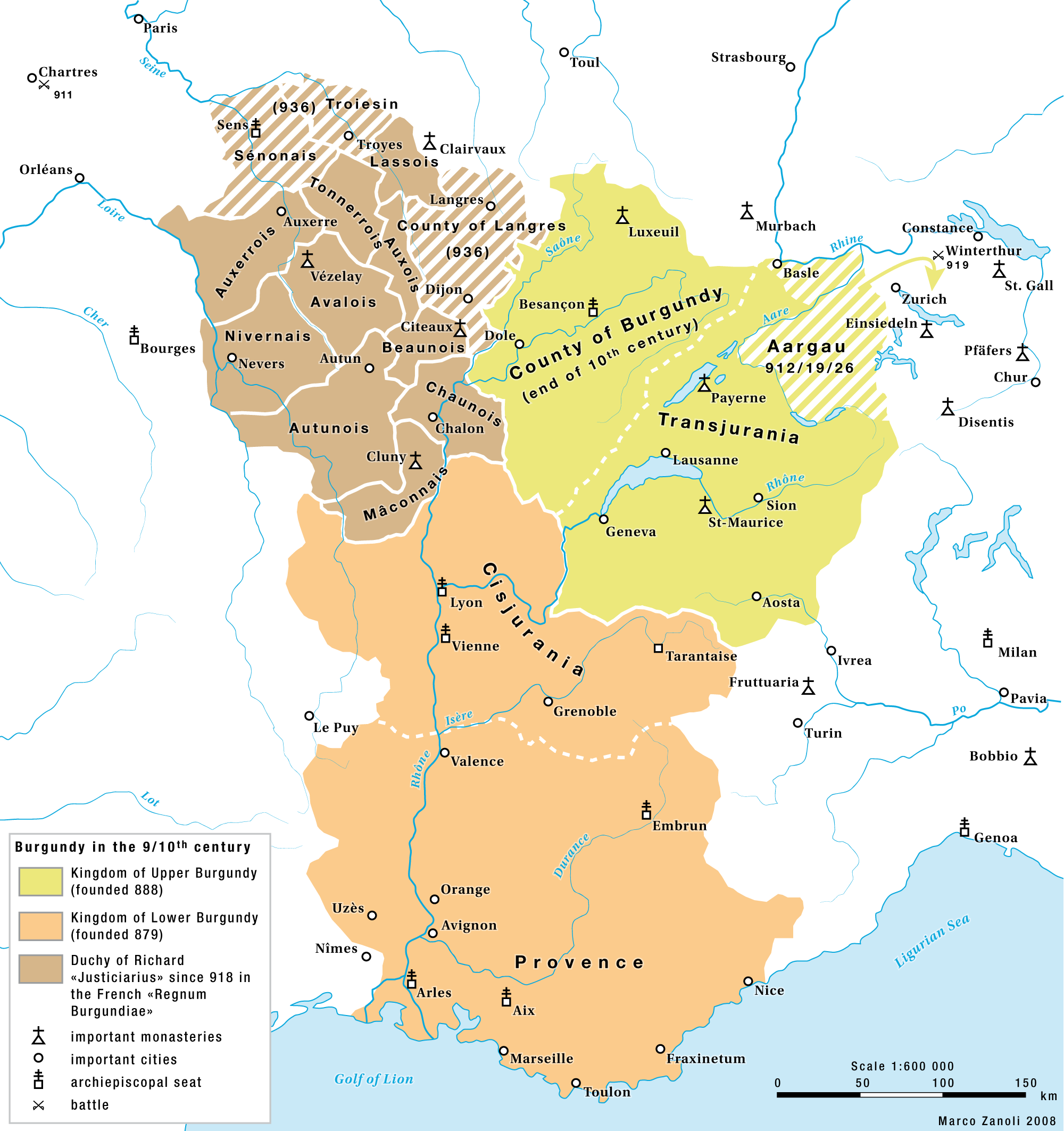
Main regions of the historical Kingdom of Burgundy, circa 900 Upper Burgundy Lower Burgundy Duchy of Burgundy

The history of Burgundy stretches from late antiquity up to the contemporary period. In the 5th century, the Burgundians, a Germanic people, settled in the wider region of the river Rhône and established the Kingdom of the Burgundians, thus giving the new name to those parts of Roman Gaul. In 534, the Burgundian realm was incorporated into the Frankish Kingdom. After the Treaty of Prüm (855), a renewed Burgundian polity started to emerge, following various divisions of the Carolingian Empire. In time, two distinctive realms were formed, the Lower Burgundy (879) and the Upper Burgundy (888). In 933, they were united to form the Kingdom of Burgundy (Arles), that existed until 1032, when it was incorporated into the Holy Roman Empire.

Since the 10th century, northern Burgundian regions were divided between the Duchy of Burgundy (to the west of the river Saône, belonging to the Kingdom of France), and the Free County of Burgundy (to the east of the same river, belonging to the Holy Roman Empire). The Duchy of Burgundy later became the French province of Bourgogne, while the Free County of Burgundy became the province of Franche-Comté (literally meaning the free county).

At different times and under different geopolitical circumstances, various political entities have gone by the name of 'Burgundy'. Historian Norman Davies has commented that "[f]ew subjects in European history have created more havoc than that summarized by the phrase 'all the Burgundies'." In 1862, James Bryce compiled a list of ten such entities, a list which Davies himself extends to fifteen, ranging from the first Burgundian kingdom founded by Gunther in the fifth century, to the modern French région of Burgundy.

In 2016, the area was formally reorganized into Bourgogne-Franche-Comté, merging the two former regions.

== Pre-Burgundian ==
The first recorded peoples of the area now referred to as Burgundy were various tribes of Celtic Gauls, the most prominent of which were the Aedui. Under a chief magistrate known as a Vergobret, the Aedui maintained a semi-republican form of government, but were eventually absorbed into the expanding Roman Empire. Following several revolts, the Aedui leadership was invited to join the Roman Senate, becoming the first Gauls to receive such an offering, after which Gallo-Roman culture flourished in the region.

== Kingdom of Burgundy (411–534) ==
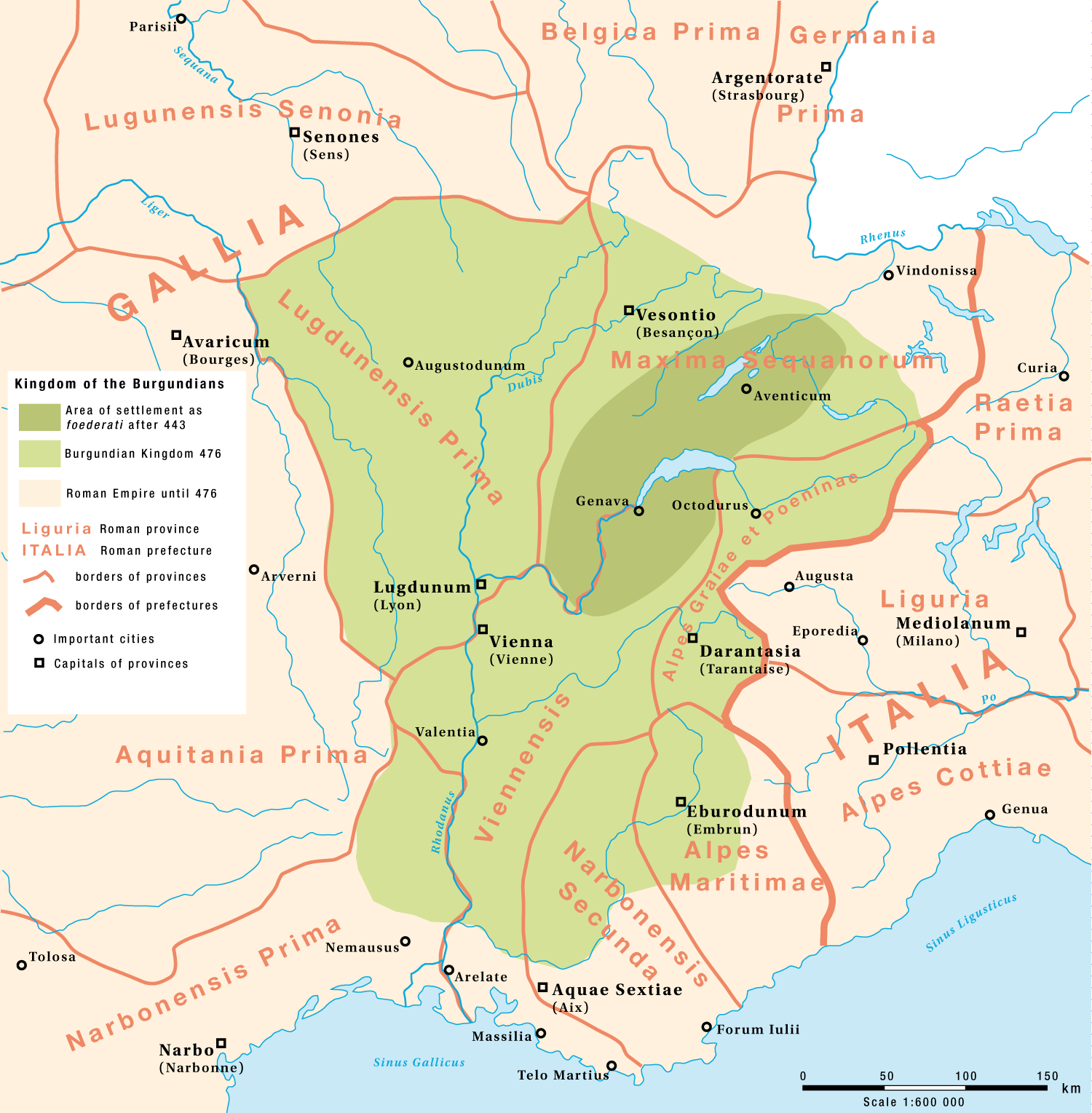
The ancient Kingdom of the Burgundians (411-534)

The Burgundians, who migrated into the Western Roman Empire as it collapsed, are generally regarded as a Germanic people, possibly originating in Bornholm (modern Denmark). (A fringe theory suggests that the Burgundians may have been the Βουρουγουνδοι Bourougoundoi later alluded to by the Aeolian historian Agathias, as a component of Eurasian steppe peoples, namely the "Scythian or Huns" and, by implication, Turkic peoples like the Bulgars). While they were dominated by the Huns for a time and adopted some of their cultural practices, Agathias may have confused or conflated the Burgundians with the Lombards, who apparently had more significant ties to the Huns and Bulgars.

In 411, the Burgundians crossed the Rhine and established a kingdom at Worms. Amidst repeated clashes between the Romans and Huns, the Burgundian kingdom eventually occupied what is today the borderlands between Switzerland, France, and Italy. In 534, the Franks defeated Godomar, the last Burgundian king, and absorbed the territory into the Frankish Kingdom.

== Frankish Burgundy ==
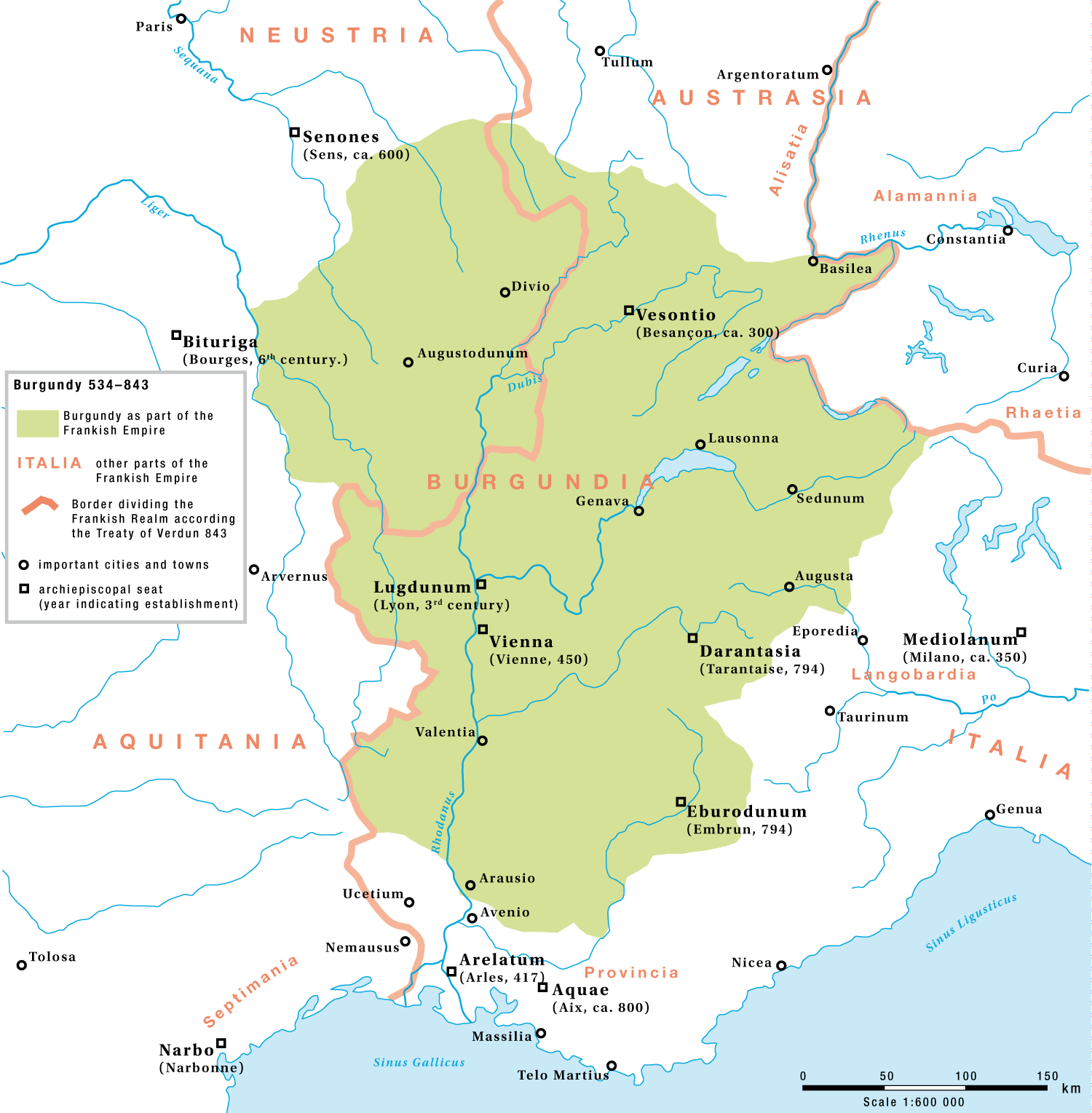
Burgundy under the Frankish rule between 534 and 879

The Frankish period in the history of Burgundy is divided in two dynastic eras, the Merovingian (534–751) and the Carolingian (751–879).

=== Merovingian Burgundy (534–751) ===
Since the Frankish conquest in 534, Burgundy was ruled by various members of the Merovingian dynasty, and became one of the three main polities that together defined the core Frankish realm, together with Austrasia and Neustria. Between 561 and 592, and again between 639 and 737, several Merovingian rulers used the title of "King of Burgundy".

=== Carolingian Burgundy (751–879) ===
Division of the Carolingian Empire under the Treaty of Prüm (855), including the realm of Charles the Young (in purple)

Division of Burgundian lands after the death of Charles the Young in 863

Under the Carolingian rule, since 751, Burgundy became the central region within the realm of Carloman I (768-771). In 843, under the Treaty of Verdun, most of Burgundy became part of the Middle Francia that included lands from the North Sea to central Italy and was ruled by emperor Lothair I, while the northwestern part of Burgundy was assigned to the kingdom of West Francia, thus setting the bases for a lasting division of Burgundian lands.

In 855, under the Treaty of Prüm (855), Lothair's realm was divided between his three sons: Italy went to Louis II, while Lothair II received Lotharingia with Upper Burgundy, and Charles being awarded Lower Burgundy with Provence. As Charles was still young, the actual power in his realm was held by regent, count Girart II of Vienne whose wife was the sister-in-law of emperor Lothair I. Girart was an able regent, who was successful in defending the kingdom from Vikings, who raided as far as Valence. In the same time, older Carolingians, who ruled West Francia and East Francia, tried to expand their influence towards the former Middle Francia. Thus in 861, Charles' uncle, Charles the Bald of West Francia, attempted to intervene in Provence after receiving an appeal for intervention from the Count of Arles. He invaded as far as Mâcon, before being restrained by the powerful archbishop Hincmar of Rheims.

In 858, count Girart made an arrangement that, if young Charles should die without heirs, his realm would revert to Charles' older brother Lothair II who ruled in Lotharingia, but when Charles died in 863, his kingdom was divided between both of his brothers: Lothair II received the bishoprics of Lyon, Vienne and Grenoble, to be administered by Girart, while emperor Louis II received Arles, Aix-en-provence and Embrun.

After the death of Lothair II, the Treaty of Meerssen was concluded in 870, dividing much of his domains between West Francia and East Francia, while the Lower Burgundy with Provence remained under the control of emperor Louis II. After emperors death in 875, those regions were seized by the West Frankish king Charles the Bald, and also ruled by his son and successor Louis the Stammerer.

== Bosonid and Welfish Burgundy (879–1032) ==
During and after the dissolution of the Frankish Empire, multiple polities governed parts of Burgundy at different times. During the late 9th century there were three Burgundies:

1. the Kingdom of Upper Burgundy around the Jura mountains,
2. the Kingdom of Lower Burgundy with Provence,
3. the Duchy of Burgundy west of the Saône.

The two kingdoms of Upper and Lower Burgundy were reunited in 933 as the Kingdom of Burgundy. This kingdom in turn was absorbed into the Holy Roman Empire under Conrad II in 1032. It was known from the 12th century as the Kingdom of Arles. The Duchy of Burgundy was annexed by the French throne in 1004.

== Kingdom of Burgundy (Arles) ==
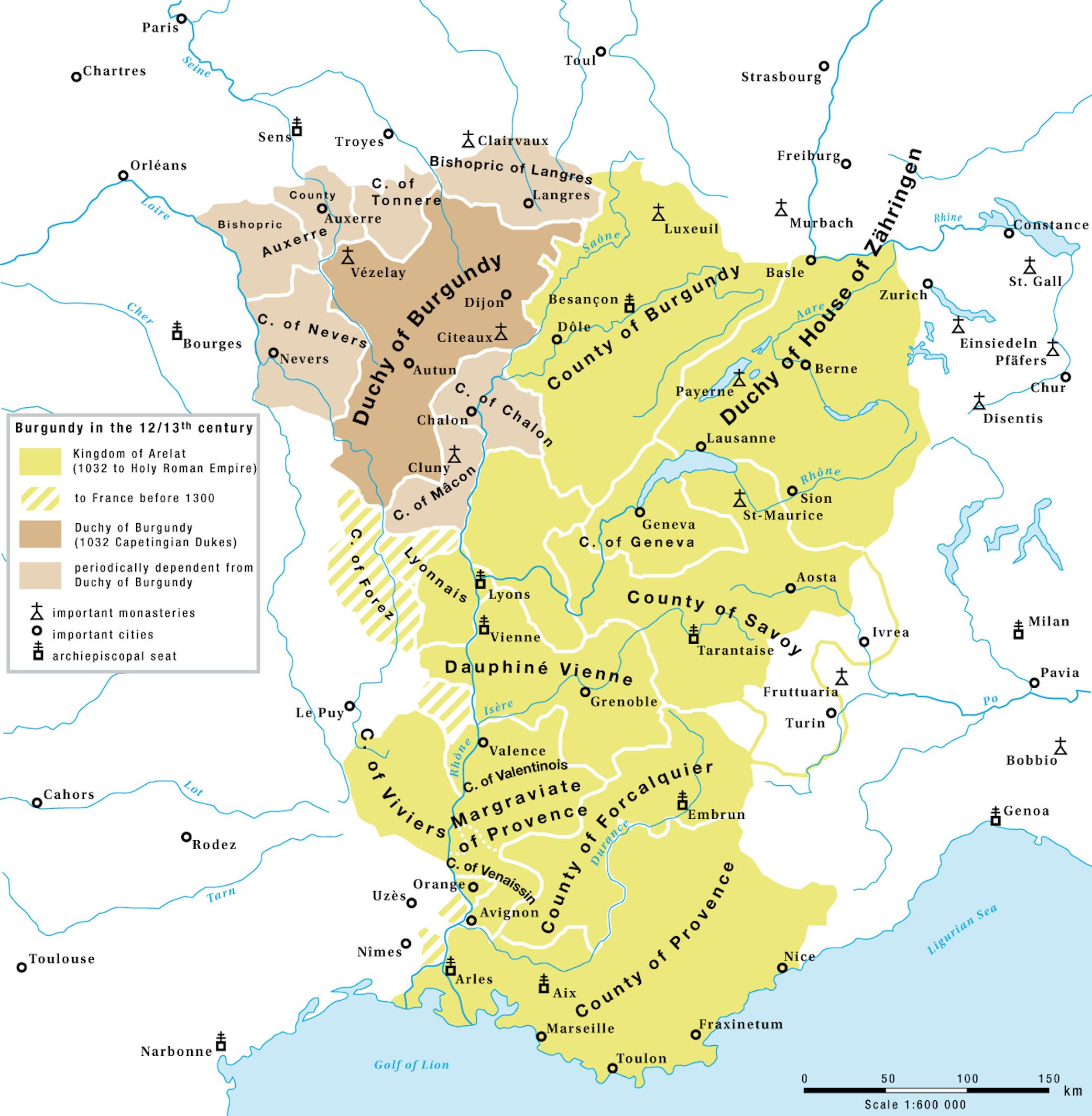
The Kingdom of Burgundy (Arles) and the Capetian Duchy of Burgundy in the 12th and 13th centuries

Territory of the Duchy of Burgundy (Bourgogne) in 1477 marked in yellow

During the 12th and 13th centuries, the County of Burgundy emerged from the area previously within the Kingdom of Upper Burgundy. It became known as the Free County of Burgundy or Franche-Comté.

During the Middle Ages, Burgundy was the seat of some of the most important Western churches and monasteries, among them Cluny, Cîteaux, and Vézelay.

During the Hundred Years' War, King John II of France gave the duchy to his youngest son, Philip the Bold, rather than leaving it for his successor on the French throne. Following a personal union between the Duchy and the County of Burgundy, the "Two Burgundies" soon became a major rival to the French throne. The Dukes of Burgundy succeeded in assembling an empire stretching from Switzerland to the North Sea, in large part by marriage. This Burgundian State consisted of a number of fiefdoms on both sides of the (then largely symbolic) border between the Kingdom of France and the Holy Roman Empire. Its economic heartland was in the Low Countries, particularly Flanders and Brabant. The Burgundian court outshone the French court both economically and culturally. In Belgium and in the south of the Netherlands, the expression "Burgundian lifestyle" is still used to denote enjoyment of life, good food, and extravagant spectacle.

In 1477, at the battle of Nancy during the Burgundian Wars, the last duke Charles the Bold was killed in battle, and the Duchy itself was annexed by France. France's King Francis signed the Treaty of Madrid, agreeing to transfer Burgundy to Spain. In the first known instance of a referendum, in 1527 he held a plebiscite in Burgundy on whether or not to transfer the area to the Spanish king. Most voters rejected the idea.

In the late 15th and early 16th centuries, the other Burgundian territories provided a power base for the rise of the Habsburgs, after Maximilian of Austria married the surviving daughter of the ducal family, Mary. After her death, her husband moved his court first to Mechelen and later to the palace at Coudenberg, Brussels, and from there ruled the remnants of the empire, the Low Countries (Burgundian Netherlands) and Franche-Comté, then still an imperial fief. The latter territory was ceded to France in the Treaty of Nijmegen of 1678.

== Modern Burgundy ==
With the French Revolution in the end of the 18th century, the administrative units of the regions disappeared, but were reconstituted during the Fifth Republic in the 1970s. The modern-day administrative région includes most of the former duchy.

In 2016, the regions of Burgundy and Franche-Comté were merged to found the new administrative region of Bourgogne-Franche-Comté.

== See also ==
- Bourgogne-Franche-Comté
- Burgundian State
- List of chancellors of Burgundy
- Burgundian Netherlands
- Count of Burgundy
- County of Burgundy
- Duchy of Burgundy
- Duke of Burgundy
- Kingdom of Burgundy
- King of Burgundy
- House of Burgundy
- Timeline of Dijon
- Burgundian Circle
- Spanish Road
- Middle Francia

== Sources ==
- Bouchard, Constance B. (1987). Sword, Miter, and Cloister: Nobility and the Church in Burgundy, 980-1198. Ithaca and London: Cornell University Press.
- Bouchard, Constance B. (1999). "Burgundy and Provence, 879–1032". The New Cambridge Medieval History. Vol. 3. Cambridge: Cambridge University Press. pp. 328–345.
- Haemers, Jelle (2009). For the Common Good: State Power and Urban Revolts in the Reign of Mary of Burgundy (1477-1482). Turnhout: Brepols.
- Hauff, Andrea (2017). "The Kingdom of Upper Burgundy and the East Frankish Kingdom at the beginning of the 10th century". History Compass. 15 (8): 1–12.
- Hauff, Andrea (2018). "Carolingian Traditions and New Beginnings: The Coronation of Rudolph I of Upper Burgundy". Bulletin du centre d'études médiévales d'Auxerre. 22 (1): 1–13.
- MacLean, Simon (2003). Kingship and Politics in the Late Ninth Century: Charles the Fat and the end of the Carolingian Empire. New York: Cambridge University Press.
- McKitterick, Rosamond (1983). The Frankish Kingdoms Under the Carolingians, 751-987. Harlow: Longman.
- Saenger, Paul (1977). "Burgundy and the Inalienability of Appanages in the Reign of Louis XI". French Historical Studies. 10 (1): 1–26.
- Schneider, Jens (2018). "Spatializing Meersen: Monasteries in Jurassian Burgundy (6th-9th c.)". Bulletin du centre d'études médiévales d'Auxerre. 22 (1): 1–20. Archived from the original on 31 May 2025.
- West, Charles (2023). The Fall of a Carolingian Kingdom: Lotharingia, 855–869. Toronto: University of Toronto Press.
