= Elithis tower =

Coordinates: 47°19′44″N 5°03′09″E

The Elithis Tower (centre), with a tram of the Dijon tramway passing

The Elithis tower is an office building with shops in Dijon, capital of the Bourgogne region of France. It has a total area of 5,000 square metres (54,000 ft^{2}) and opened on April 2, 2009. Designed by the firm Elithis engineering, it is part of the Clémenceau district that also includes the convention centre, built in 1950, and the Dijon Auditorium, built in the 1990s. Directly to the north is the Chamber of Commerce and Industry of Côte-d'Or, which was built one year before the Elithis tower. It was built on a small pedestrian plaza which also accommodates the four buildings mentioned above.

The main feature of this tower at its opening was that it was the most environmentally friendly building in France. It is equipped with photovoltaic modules that provide about 70% of the electricity consumed by the building, it uses environmentally friendly insulation materials such as cellulose, and uses no air conditioning, but exterior panels that cover the glass surfaces exposed to the sun during the day (called the solar shield), without requiring the use of artificial lighting most of the time.

An online bulletin board located on the front of the tower provides in real-time the amount of energy produced in kilowatts by the building since its opening.
