= Dijon Exhibition =

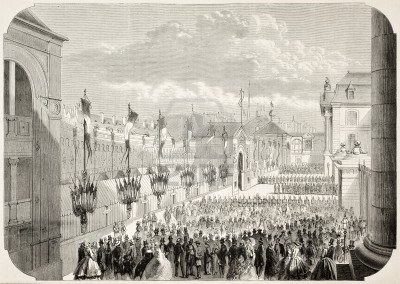
- Inauguration

Overview
- BIE-class: Unrecognized exposition
- Name: Dijon Exhibition
- Visitors: 120 000
- Organized by: Par J Soubie (director)

Location
- Country: France
- City: Dijon
- Coordinates: 47°19′18″N 5°2′30″E

Timeline
- Opening: 8 June 1858
- Closure: September 1858

The Dijon Exhibition took place in the former Palace of the Dukes of Burgundy, Place du Théâtre and the Place d'Armes and exhibited Agriculture, fine arts, and industry.

There were 120 000 visitors.

== Timeline ==
At the end of 1857 the permanent Society of Friends of Dijon arts decided to hold an arts, industry and agriculture exhibition. On 7 January 1858 the Dijon municipality examined its feasibility and added the Côte-d'Or horticulture society and presidents of music companies. The Cote D'or prefect approved the project on 16 January. The fair opened on 8 July after being deferred from 1 June.

== Personnel ==
The director was Par J Soubie.

Marcellin Jobard, director of the Musée de l'industrie (Bruxelles) industry chaired the food substances (the 11th class of exhibits) jury, with Edouard de la Loyere, chairman of the agriculture and viticulture committee of the borough of Beaune vice-president. A Medal of Honour was awarded to Jules Bessy, cereal trader in Chalon-sur-Saône.
