= Musée Rude =

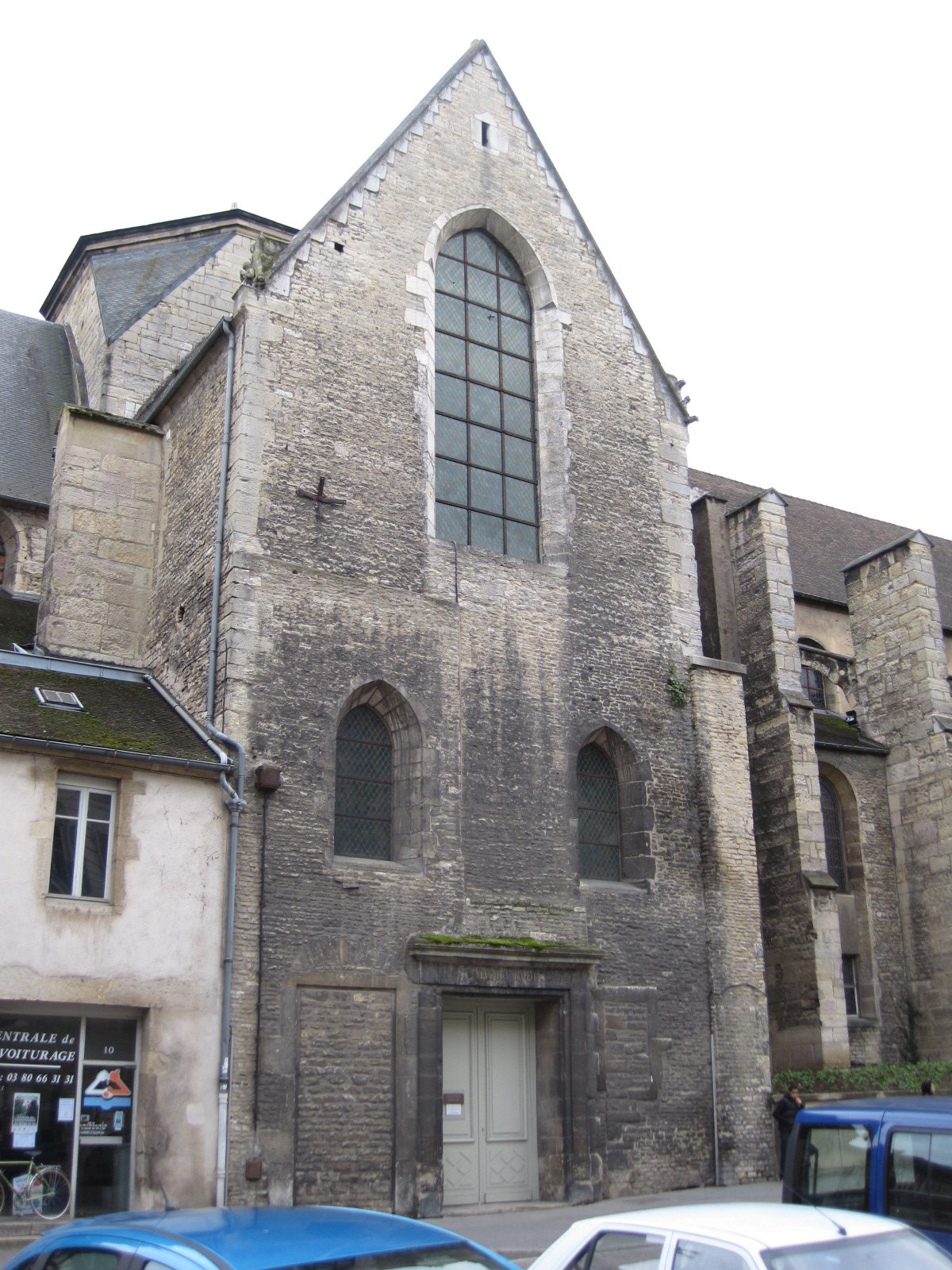
- Musée François Rude in the transept and the choir of the Église Saint-Étienne of Dijon
- Established: 1947
- Location: 8 Rue Vaillant; 21000 Dijon, France
- Coordinates: 47.320896°N 5.044091°E
- Type: Art museum

The Musée Rude is an art museum dedicated to the French sculptor François Rude (1784–1855). It has the "Musée de France" label and has been housed since 1947, in a part of the former Église Saint-Étienne of Dijon, built during the 11th century. The museum displays life-size plaster casts acquired by the Dijon municipality between 1887 and 1910, which are major works by the artist exhibited in other museums in France (including the Louvre in Paris). The museum also displays archaeological crypt of the 11th century, and the former St. Stephen's Gate of the Dijon castrum of the 3rd century on which the church is built. Open from 9:30 am to 6 pm from 1 June to 30 September, the museum is free. Labeled Museum of France since February 1, 2003, it is attached to the Dijon Museum of Fine Arts, which manages it.

== Works ==
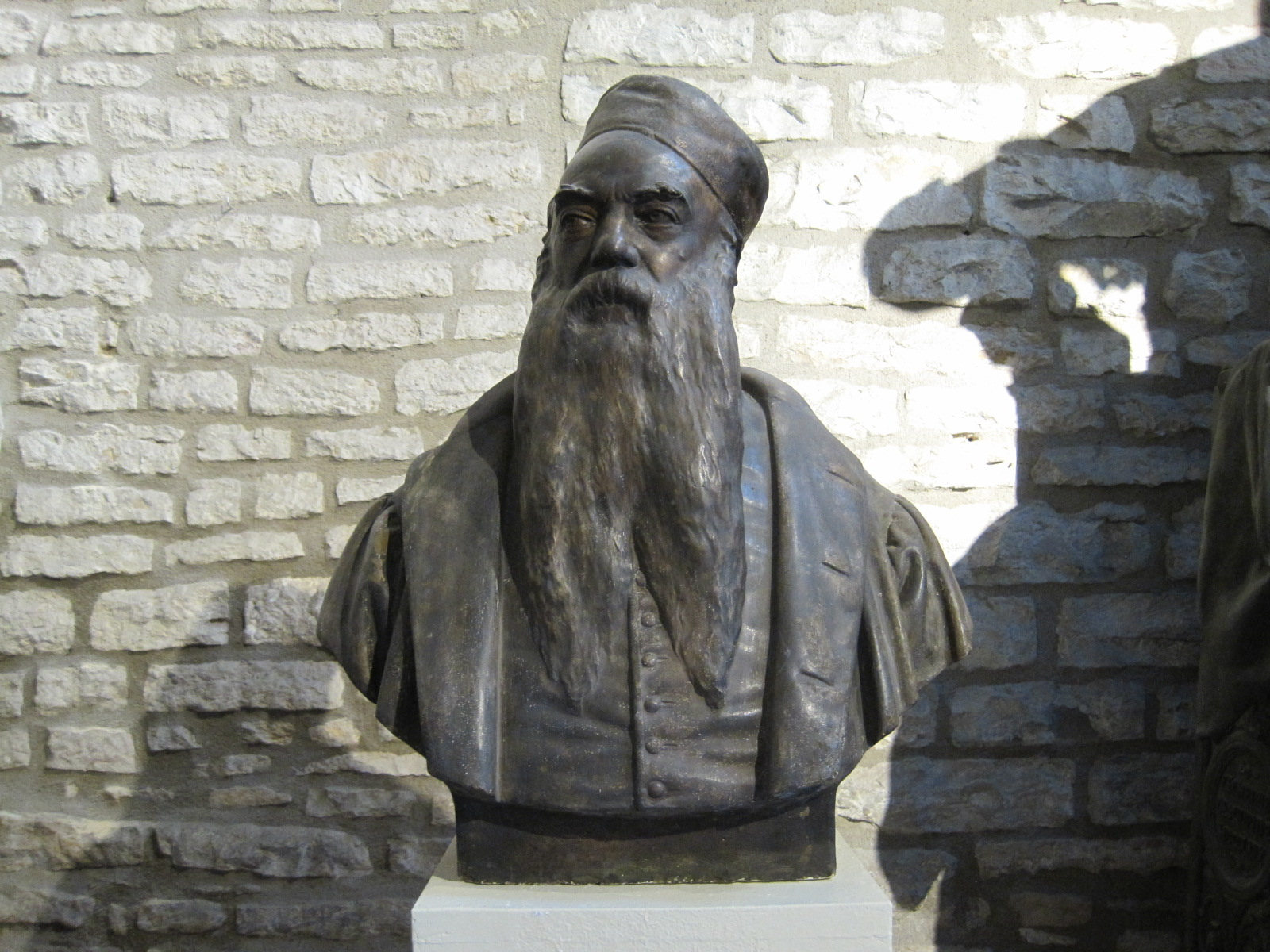
Bust of François Rude by his pupil, sculptor Paul Cabet

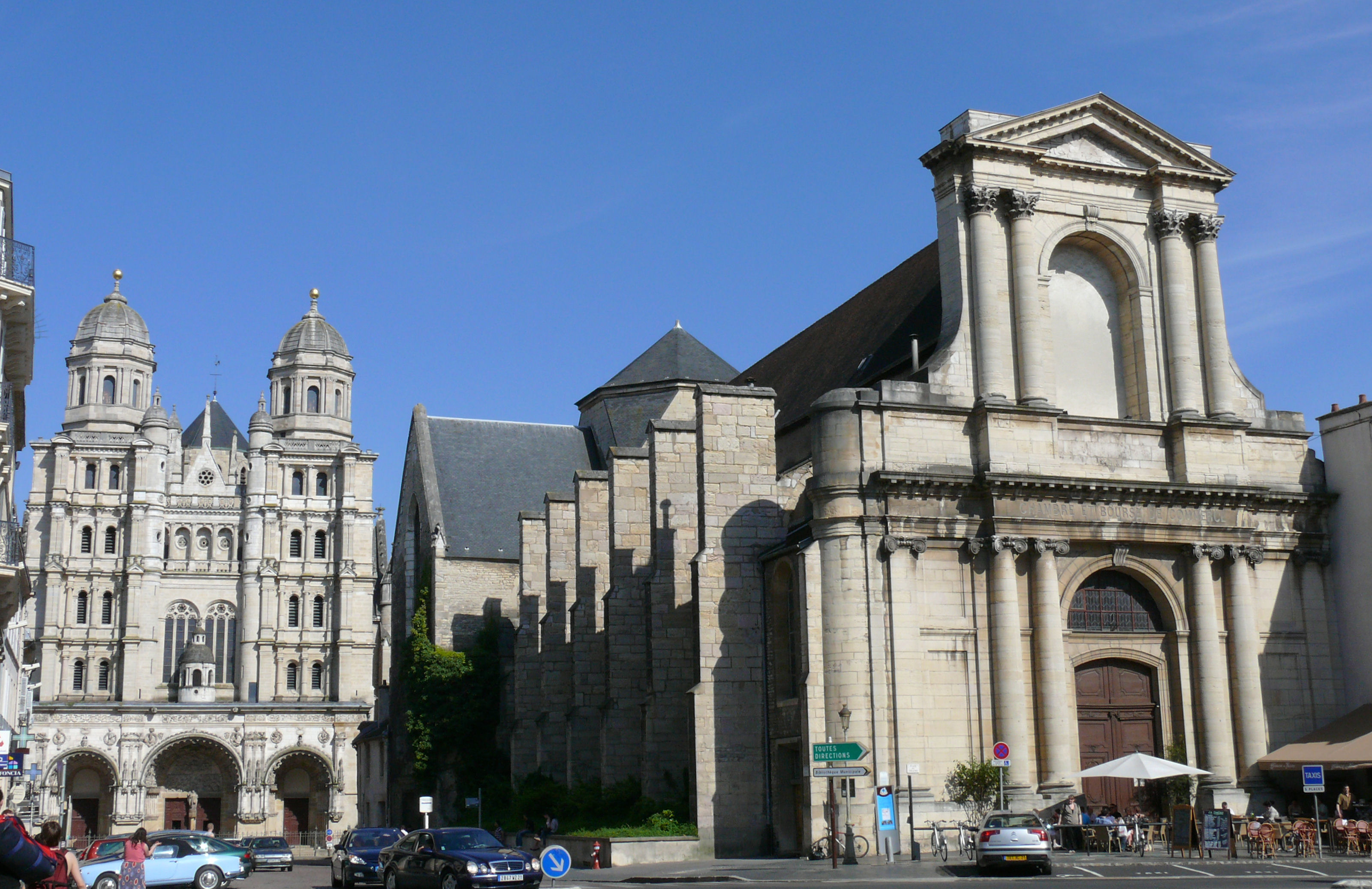
Église Saint-Étienne and Église Saint-Michel, Dijon

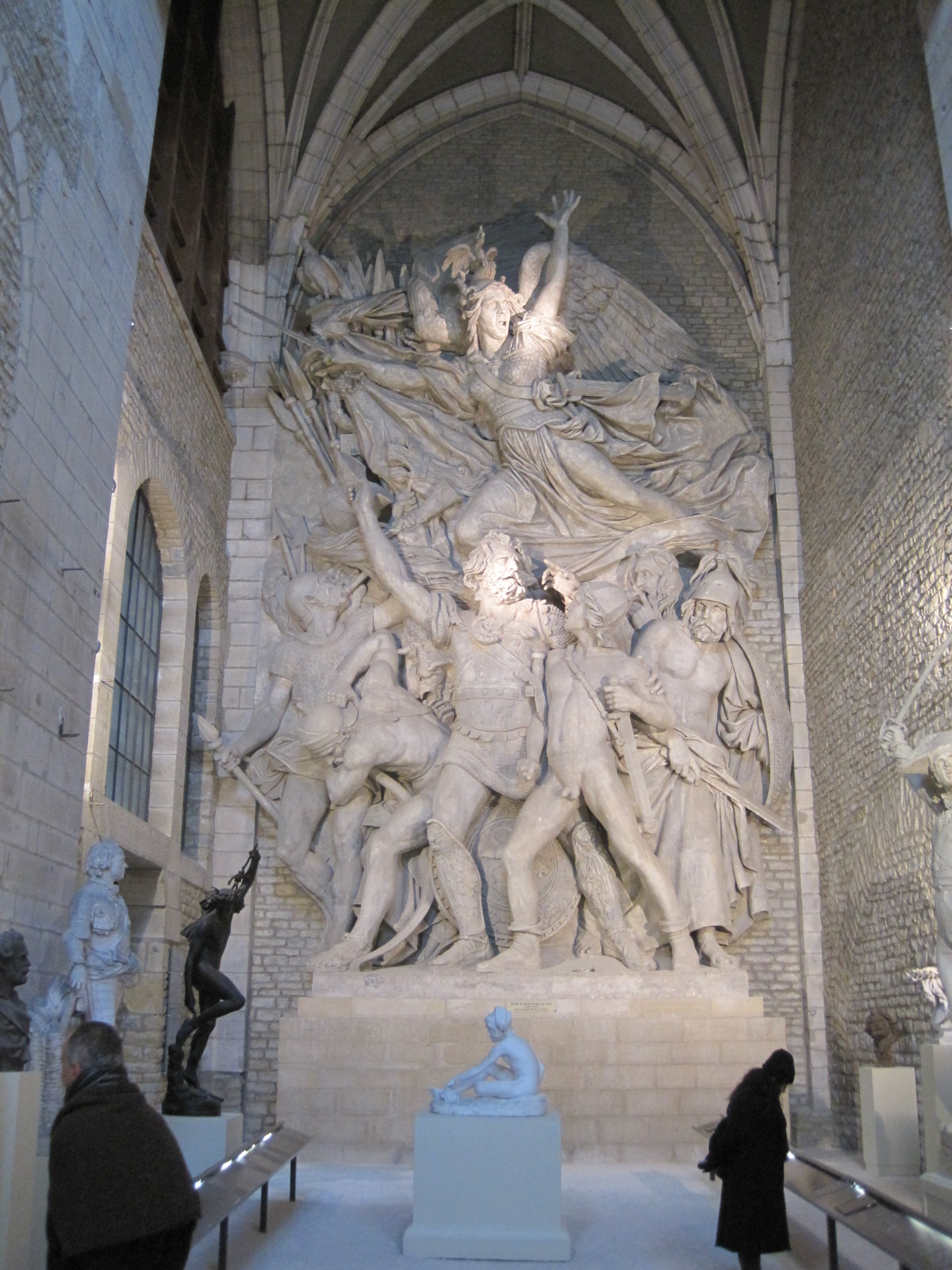
La Marseillaise from the Arc de triomphe de l'Étoile, Paris

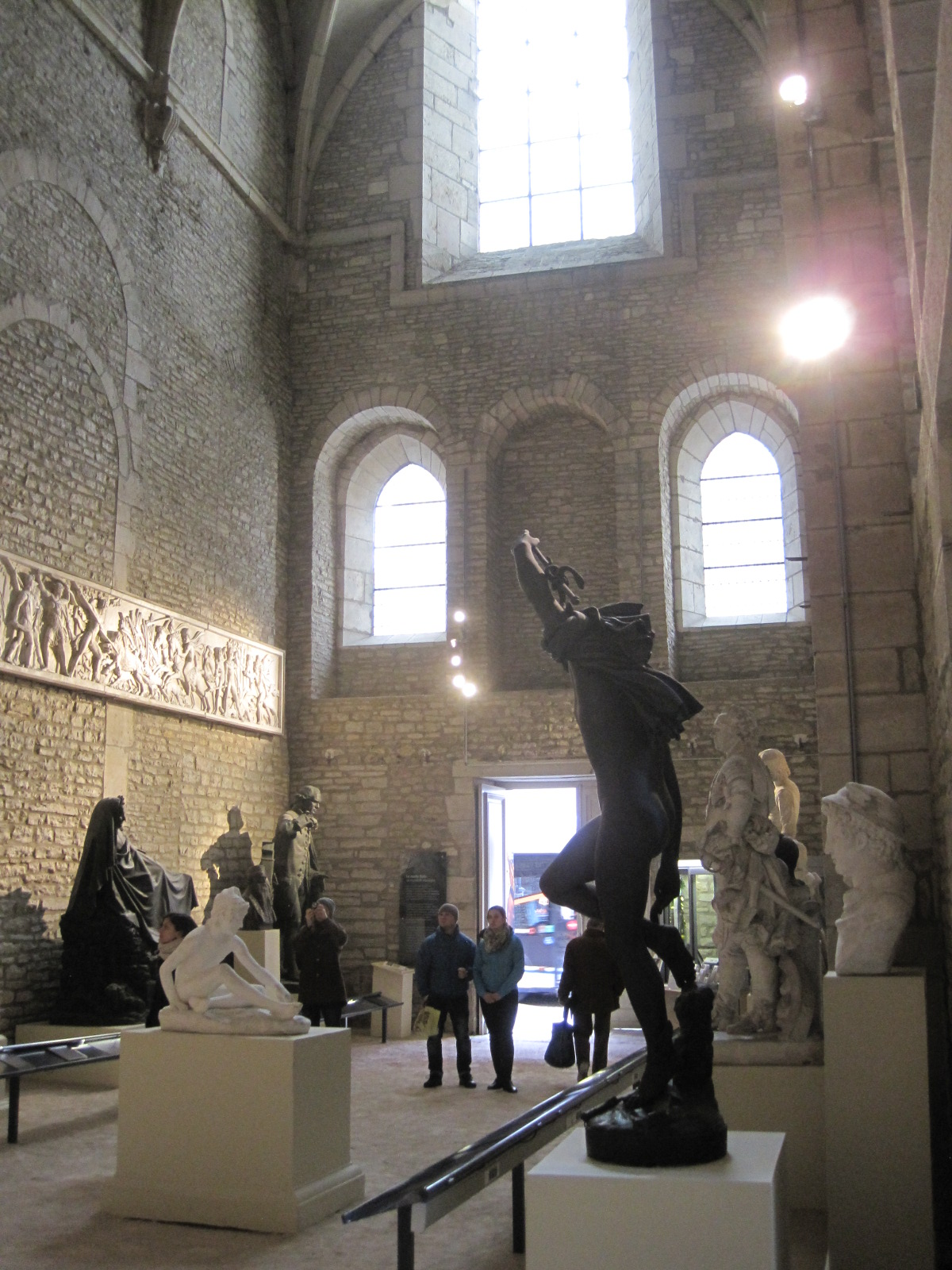
Entrance of the museum

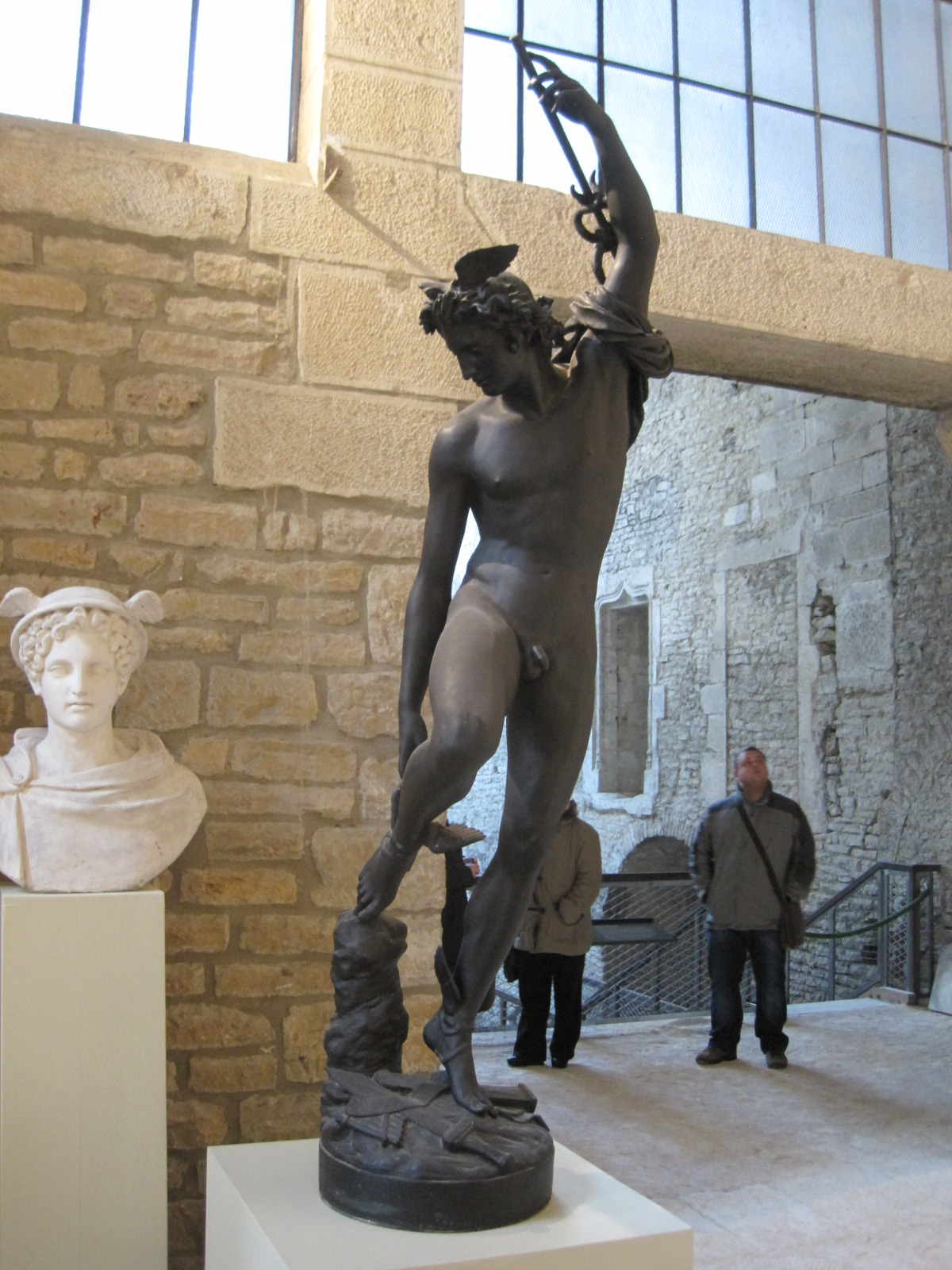
Mercury attaching his wings

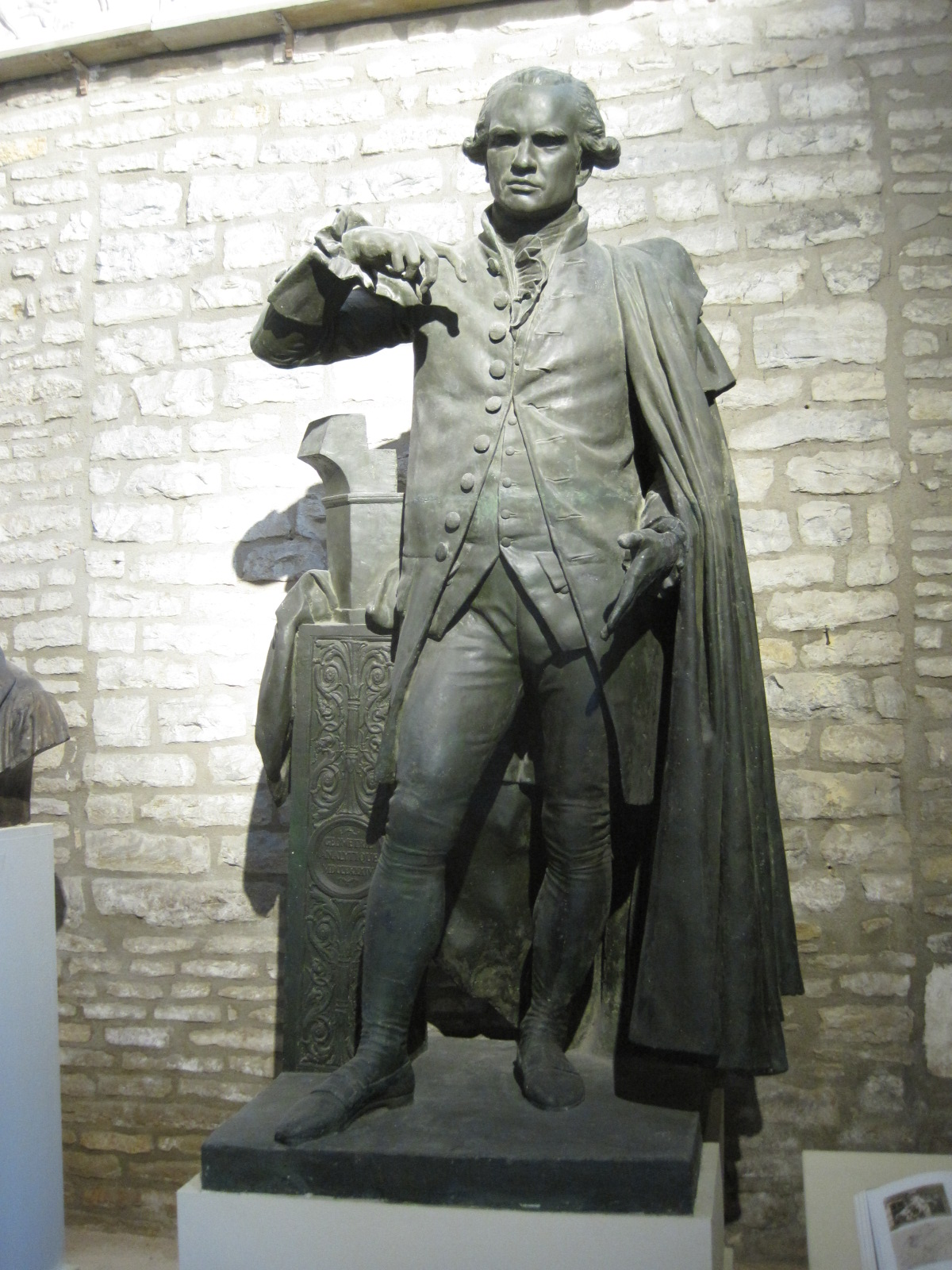
Mathematician Gaspard Monge

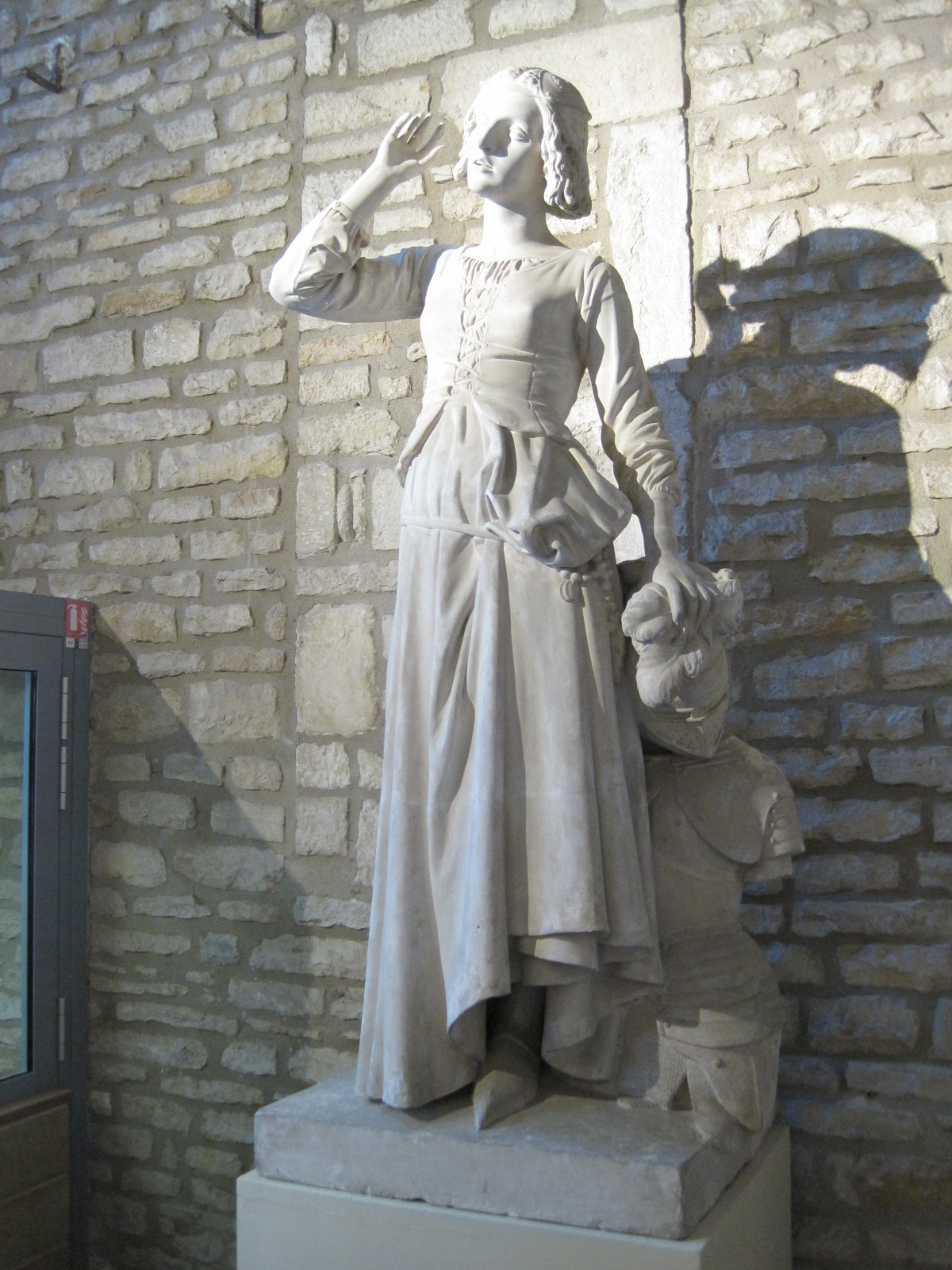
Joan of Arc hearing voices

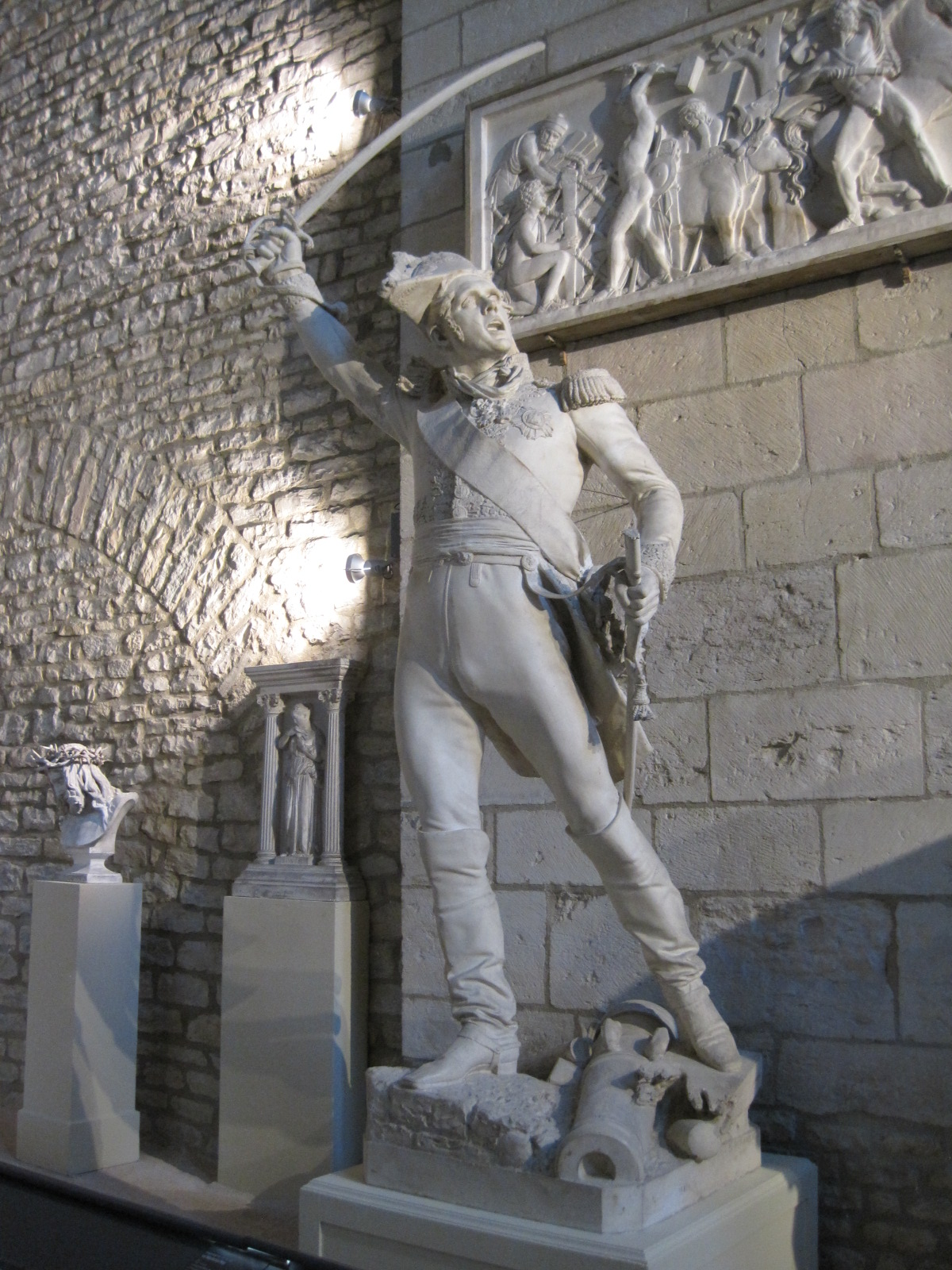
Michel Ney

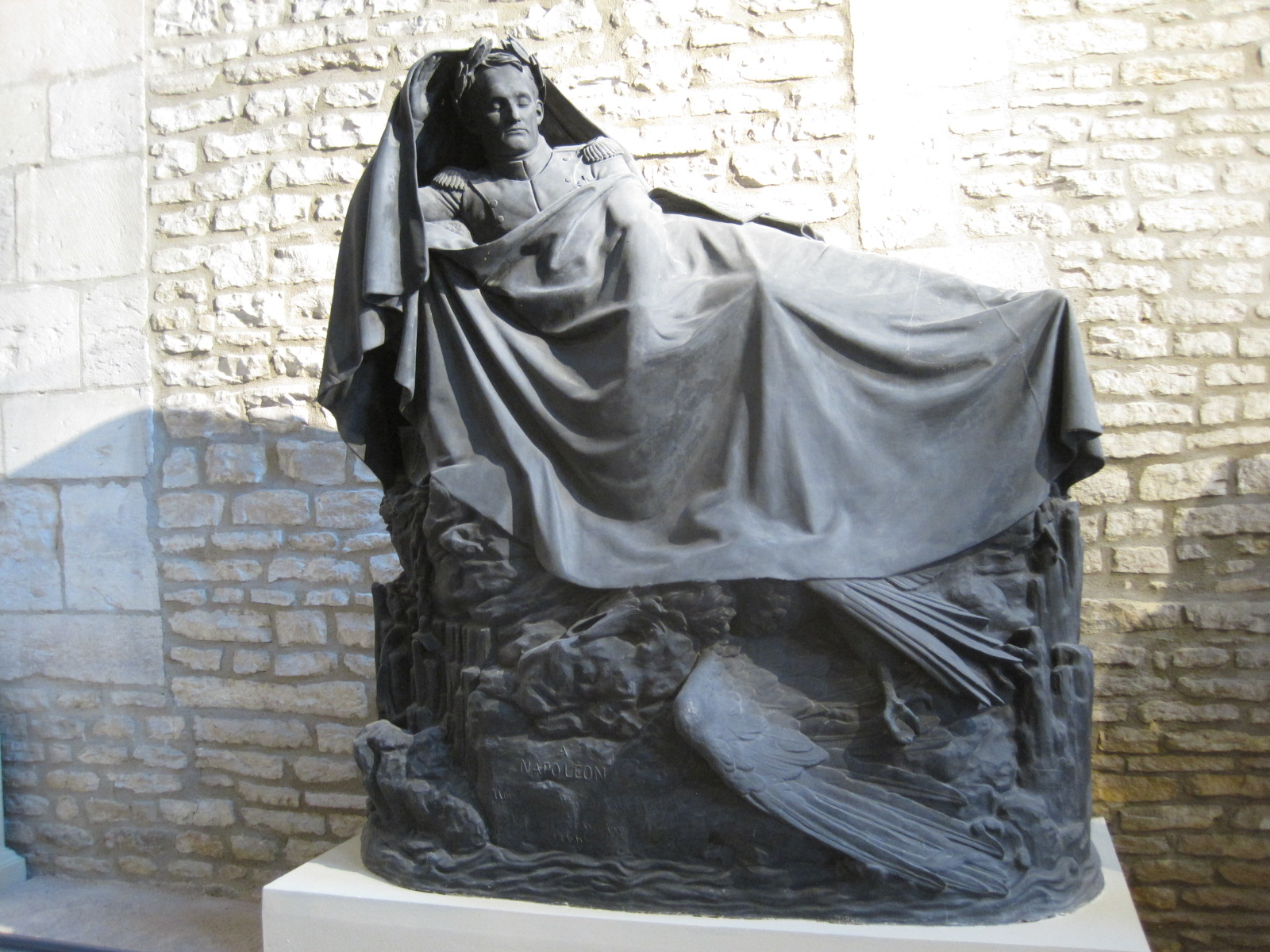
Napoléon Bonaparte awakening to immortality

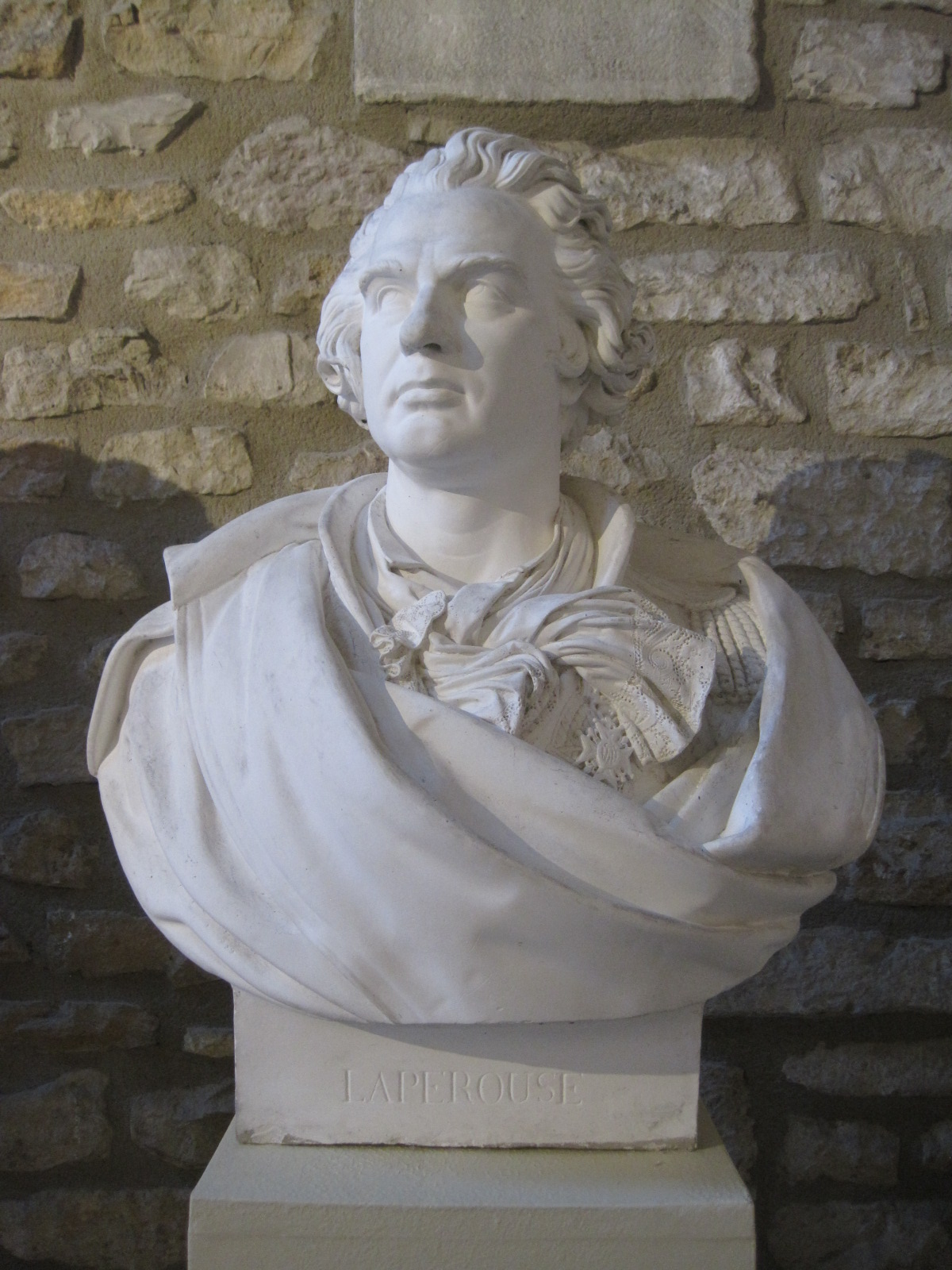
Bust of navigator and explorer La Pérouse

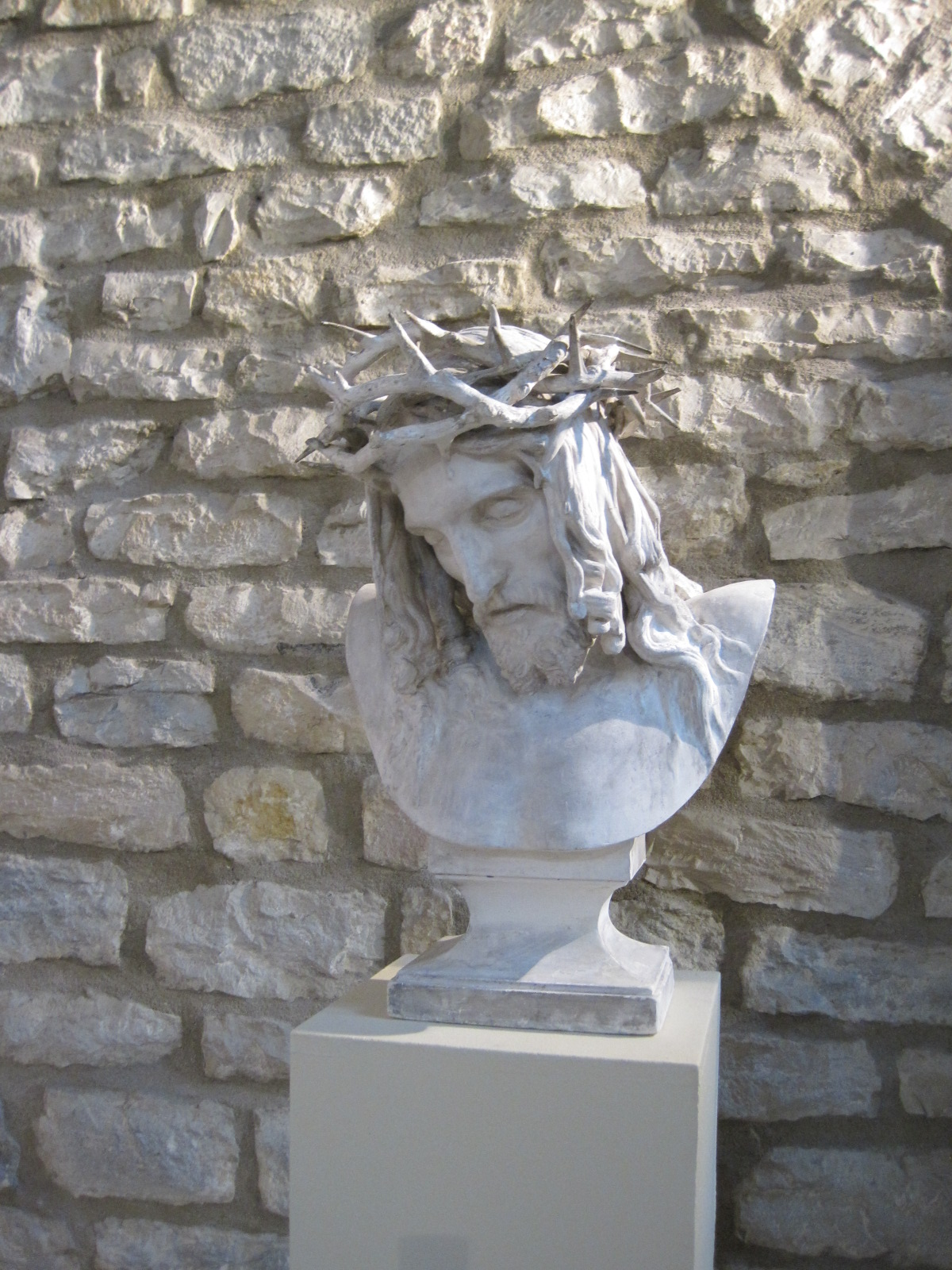
Bust of Christ crucified

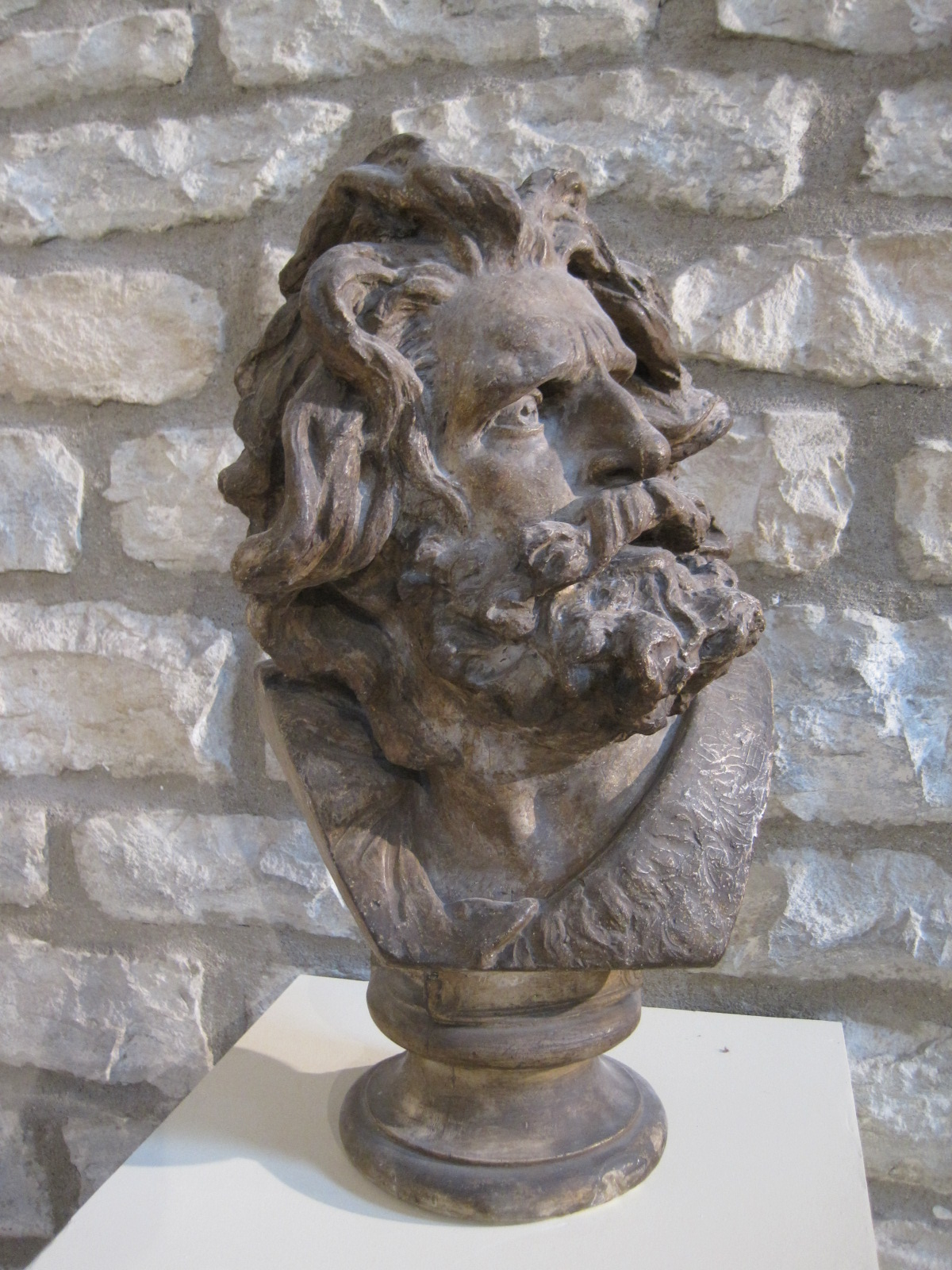
Head of old warrior

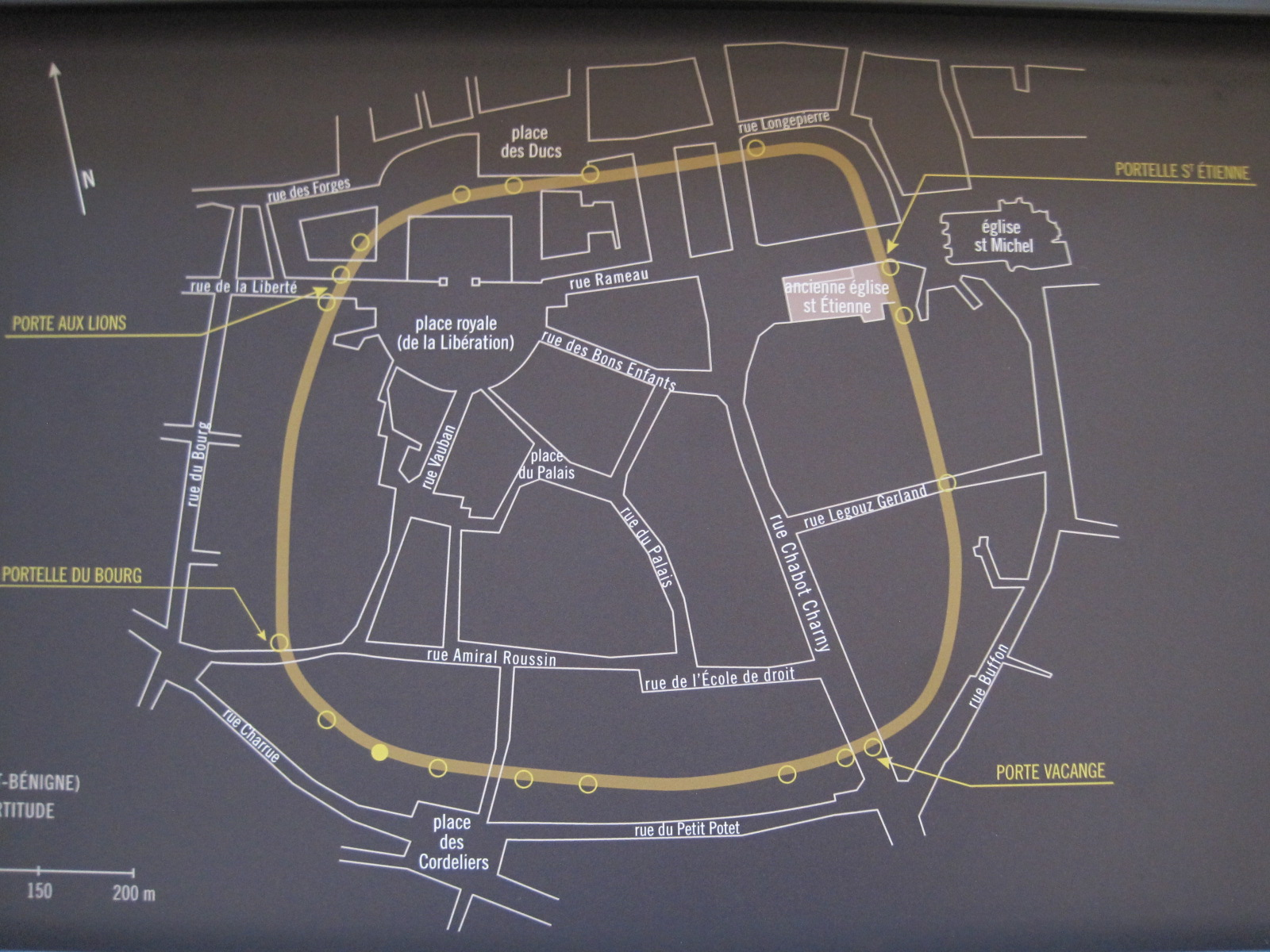
Former Dijon castrum

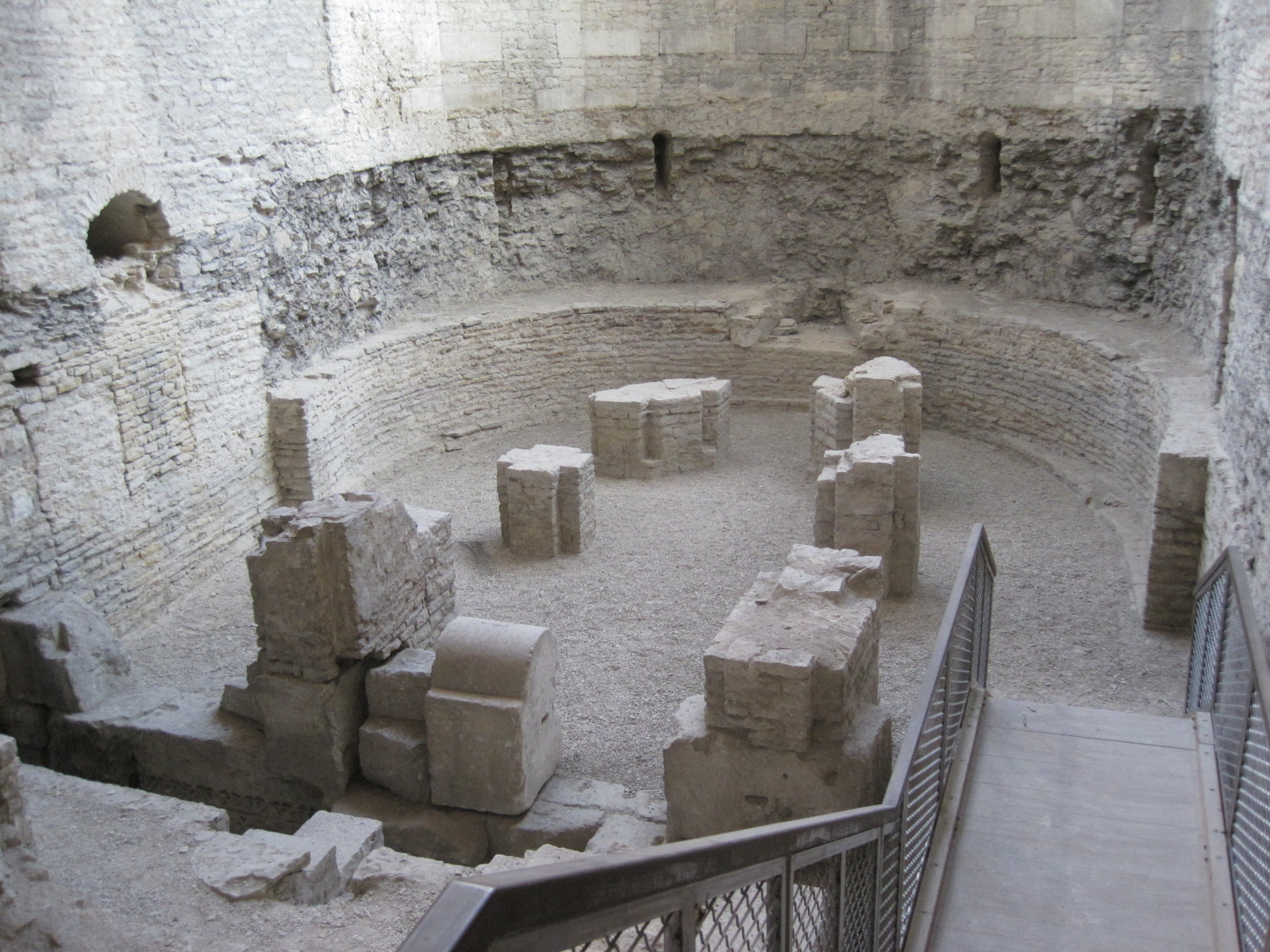
Archaeological crypt and St. Stephen's Gate of the Dijon castrum

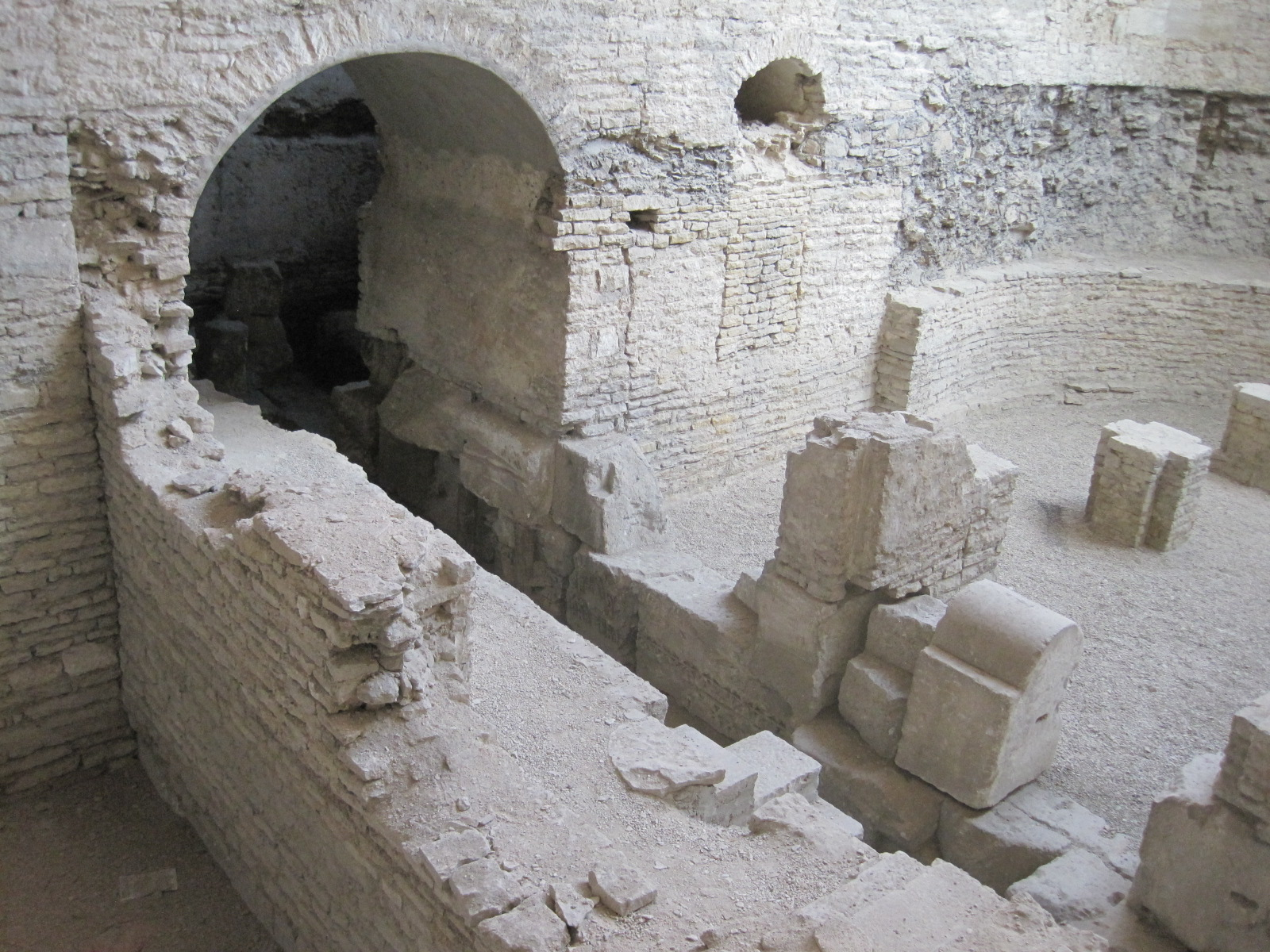

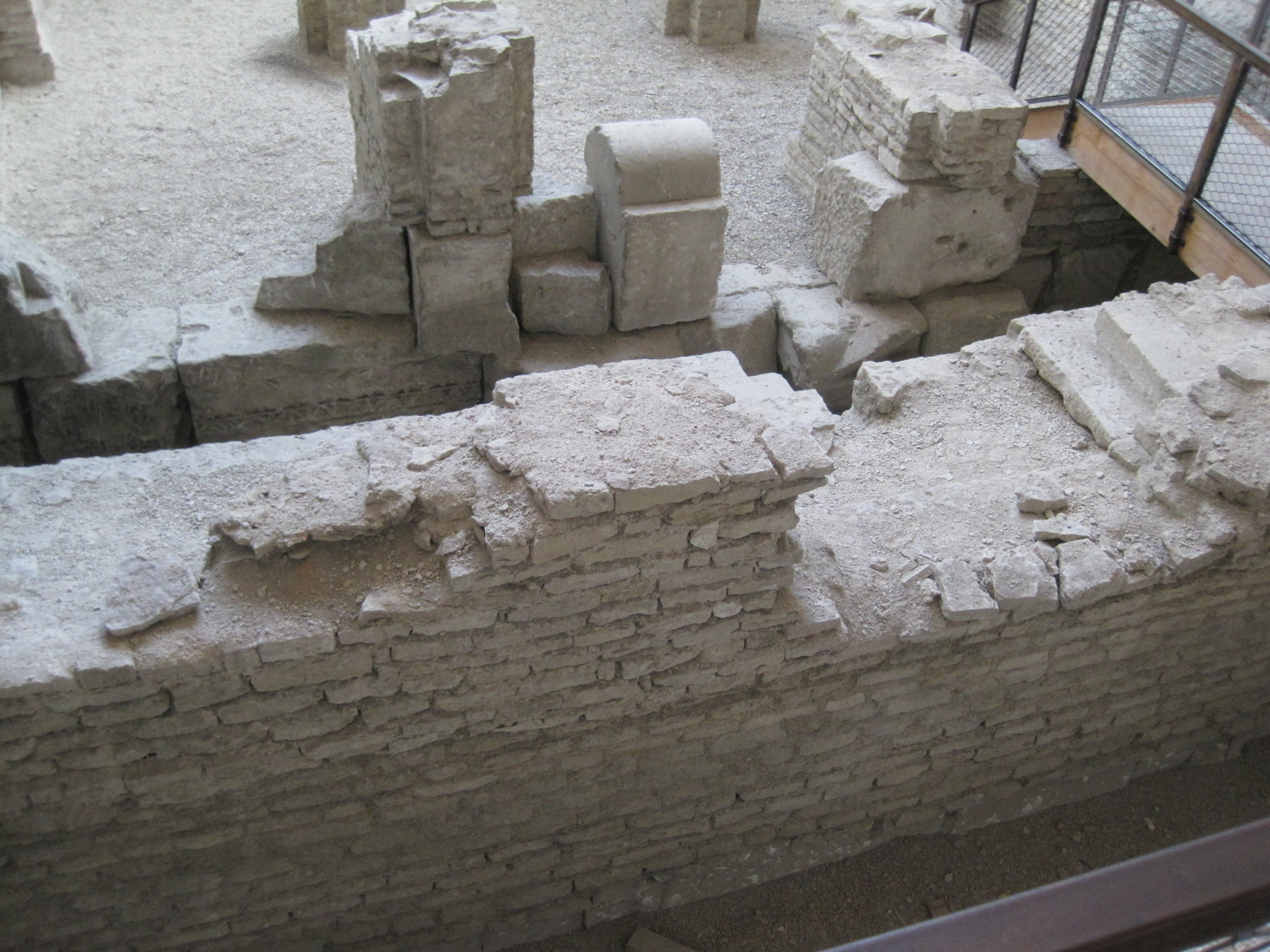
