= Dijon tramway =

City tramway system in France

- A Dijon tram at Place Jean Bouhey, 2024

Overview
- Native name: Tramway de Dijon
- Locale: Dijon, Bourgogne, France
- Transit type: Tram
- Number of lines: 2
- Number of stations: 35

Operation
- Began operation: September 2012

Technical
- System length: 18.9 km (11.7 mi)
System map
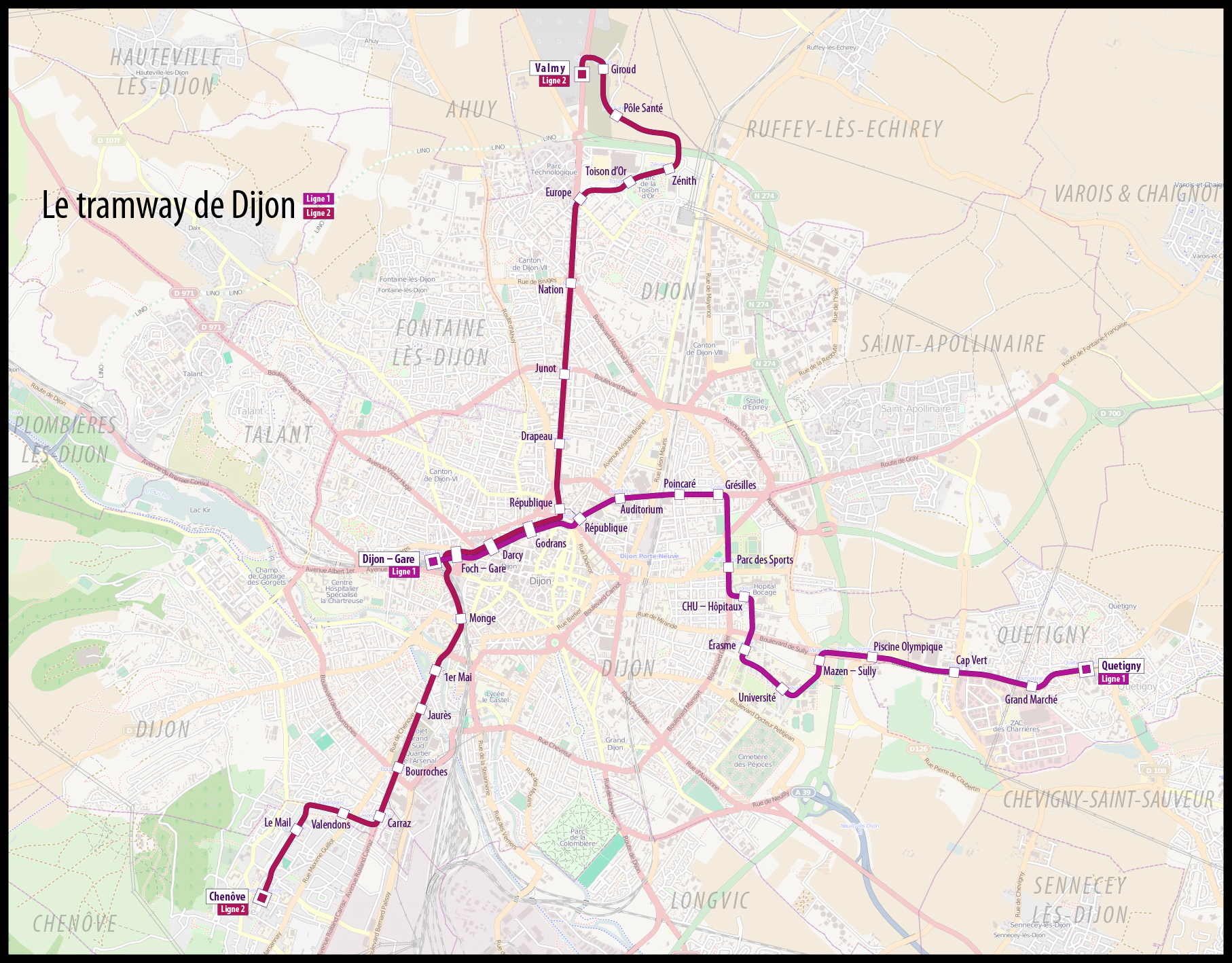
Map of the Dijon tramway

The Dijon tramway (French: Tramway de Dijon) is a tramway system opened in Dijon, France, in September 2012. The tramway consists of two lines totaling 20 kilometres (12.4 mi) in length and serving 37 stations.

The tramway was designed with the existing requirements of commuting population in mind, recognising students and the working population to be its target demographic. It was constructed under a €176 million public–private partnership (PPP) contract between the Grand Dijon urban authority and Cofely Ineo, formed on 1 July 2010. A total of 33 Citadis trams were procured under a standardised batch order from French rolling stock manufacturer Alstom Transport to be used on the new network. Construction work on the tramway commenced during the following months. Reportedly, the construction phase was completed within the allocated budget and six months ahead of the established schedule.

On 3 September 2012, Line T1, was the first one to be opened, is 8.5 km (5.3 mi) long and has 16 stations running from the Dijon railway station to Quetigny. Two months after opening, line T1 reportedly carried an average of 36,000 passengers per day during its first two months in service, which was 6,000 more than even the highest forecasts had projected. Line T2, which is 11.5 km (7.1 mi) long, opened in December 2012. It is a line with 21 stations running between Valmy and Chenôve. An expansion of commercial activity along the newly established tram routes, particularly the Place de la République, has been credited to the network's positive performance.

== History ==
=== Background ===
Previously, there had been a tramway network in Dijon starting in 1895 which comprised up to 6 lines. Just like in many French cities, this tramway was gradually replaced by buses after World War II, the last line disappearing in 1961.

The new Dijon tramway was developed to meet the travelling needs of the Greater Dijon population; reportedly, urban planners had placed a particular emphasis upon the network being suitable for use by the employees of the city's key businesses as well as students. The project to construct the line was a major element of a wider regional programme aimed at developing new infrastructure that would possess positive environmental attributes. To enable the tramway to better minimise the level of road traffic across the city, numerous park and ride facilities were established alongside several tram stations; further measures, such as the prohibition of car traffic on certain specific roads, has also been implemented.

The Dijon tramway is comprised a pair of separate lines, designated simply as Line T1 and Line T2; the former possessing a length of 8.5 km (5.3 mi) and the latter being 11.5 km (7.1 mi) long. The tramways were intentionally designed to traverse many of Dijon's major commercial zones. To encourage usage of the new network, the stations that were constructed along either of the lines have a cumulative adjacent capture area (within 0.5 kilometres (0.31 mi)) which contained 76,000 people; of these, 38,000 have been classified as being students, a demographic that has been historically reliant upon public transport to get around.

=== Contractors and financing ===
On 1 July 2010, it was announced that a public-private partnership (PPP) arrangement had been formed between the Grand Dijon urban authority and Cofely Ineo to facilitate the construction of the Dijon tramway, the first such agreement of its kind to be used in France. As part of this arrangement, Cofely Ineo received €176 million to take responsibility for performing the tramway's design and construction of its electrical systems, as well as the provision of maintenance services for both the electrical equipment and command systems for the first 26 years of operations. Furthermore, French rolling stock manufacturer Alstom Transport was awarded the contract for the delivery of 33 tram vehicles for the network.

The construction of the tramway required a total investment of approximately $550 million. The European Investment Bank (EIB) was a key source of financing for the initiative, provided approximately €200 million ($262 million) towards its construction. Specifically, the EIB's funding was allocated towards the construction of the two tram lines, the procurement of the tram vehicles themselves, as well as the construction of a pair of park-and-ride facilities. Additional funding for the tramway's construction was provided by a combination of national and regional government grants, totalling €112 million, as well as €100m in borrowing from public sector financial institution Caisse des dépôts et consignations. Following its completion, the tramway has been operated by the privately owned French transport group Keolis.

=== Launch ===
A tram eastbound at Place Darcy, in the city centre

On 1 September 2012, the initial line of the Dijon tramway, T1, was inaugurated; the start of revenue operations on the network begun two days later. According to project manager Egis Rail, the opening of the line had been achieved six months ahead of schedule, while also having remained within its established budget. Months later, T2, the second line of the tramway, commenced revenue services on 8 December 2012. These two lines cover a combined distance of 20 km (12 mi) and feature a total of 37 stations along their routes. They share a little over one kilometre of track in the city centre, so the total length of two-way track is 18.9 km (11.7 mi). In recognition of its positive environmental design, the Dijon tramway was awarded the 2012 best environmental project.

Reportedly, there has been a growth in commercial activity within the city since the arrival of the tram lines. The Place de la République, which is the point where the T1 and T2 converge, has been claimed to be progressively developing into the new hub of Dijon. It has been observed that several new restaurants and other commercial businesses have been established in close proximity to the tram lines since its completion.

== Rolling stock ==
An Alstom Citadis running on green track

The Dijon tramway is operated using a fleet of 33 Alstom-built Citadis, which were new-build vehicles manufactured for the purpose of providing maximum passenger comfort. They feature integral low floors that provided step-less boarding, closed-circuit television (CCTV) for security and safety reasons, and integrated passenger information systems. Each vehicle has a length of 33 meters, accommodating in excess of 200 passengers, and designed to attain a maximum speed of 70km/h. These vehicles were acquired as part of a joint procurement with the Brest tramway, which was launching its own network around the same time as Dijon; the Dijon municipality has claimed that the joint procurement effort delivered economies of scale of 25 per cent.

The design of the Citadis trams was developed to provide various environmentally-friendly qualities. Operationally, it is designed to emit a low level of noise while travelling; reportedly, this noise level is five decibels quieter than the average road vehicle. The energy consumption by each tram is only a tenth of a contemporary bus; as such, the emission levels of greenhouse gases has been claimed to be substantially lower than cars.

== See also ==
- Trams in France
- List of town tramway systems in France
