= Zion (journal) =

Quarterly peer-reviewed academic journal covering Jewish history and ethnography

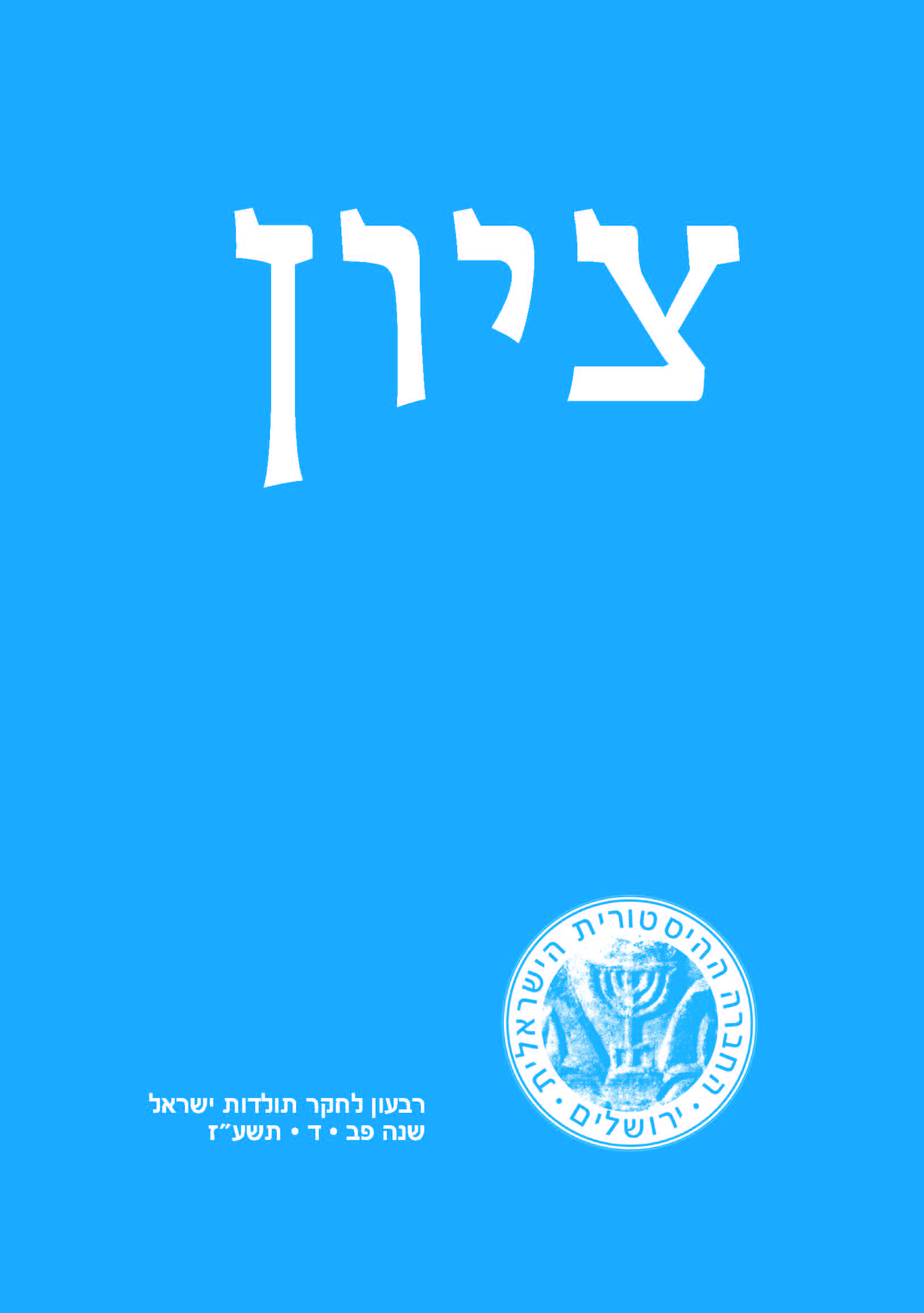
- Discipline: Jewish history and ethnography
- Language: Hebrew
- Edited by: Michael Toch, Nadav Neeman

Publication details
- Former name(s): Zion: Me'asef
- History: 1926-present
- Publisher: The Historical Society of Israel and the Zalman Shazar Center (Israel)
- Frequency: Quarterly

Standard abbreviations
- ISO 4: Zion

Indexing
- ISSN: 0044-4758
- LCCN: he67000477
- JSTOR: 00444758
- OCLC no.: 2106146

Links
- Journal homepage

Zion (Hebrew: ציון) is a quarterly peer-reviewed academic journal covering Jewish history and ethnography, printed in Hebrew and published since 1926 by the Historical Society of Israel and the Zalman Shazar Center. The journal was established by Yitzhak Baer and Benzion Dinur. The editors-in-chief are Michael Toch and Nadav Na'aman.

The journal was established in Jerusalem in 1926 as Zion: Me'asef, obtaining its current title in 1935. It covers all aspects of Jewish history, drawn from all the lands in which Jews lived - in Israel and in the Diaspora, from antiquity to the modern era, including emerging studies in historiography, review essays, and book reviews.

== Abstracting and indexing ==
The journal is abstracted and indexed in L'Année philologique, EBSCO databases, and Old Testament Abstracts.
