= Capitulary for the Jews =

Legal prescriptions in the Carolingian Empire

The first four capitula under the heading De capitulis domni Karoli imperatoris et Hludowici ('Of the chapters of the lord emperor Charles and Louis') in the 10th-century manuscript Munich, BSB, Clm 3853. The letters N, V, V and M start each capitulum.

The Capitulary for the Jews (Latin: Capitula de Iudaeis, lit. 'chapters on the Jews') is a set of six short legal prescriptions concerning Jews in the Carolingian Empire. They were gathered together and published under the title by which they are now known by Alfred Boretius in 1883, but only the first three and possibly the fourth are derived from a single source; the fifth and sixth are from an unrelated source. In one manuscript, the sixth "chapter" (capitulum) is said to have been taken "from Emperor Charles' statutes" (e decretis Karoli imperatoris), indicating either Charlemagne or Charles the Bald. Its content, however, is inconsistent with the known Jewish policies of these emperors.

== Authenticity ==
The authenticity of the capitula is highly disputed. Boretius tentatively associated the capitula with the Council of Meaux–Paris (845–46) and the antisemitism of Agobard of Lyon, because the canons of that council were sometimes inaccurately titled Capitula contra Iudaeos magni Karoli invictissmimi imperatoris caeterorumque regum cum consensus episcoporum ('Capitulary against the Jews of the most invincible emperor Charlemagne with the consent of the kings and bishop') in the manuscripts. Julius Aronius tentatively dated them to the reign of Charlemagne. Both Boretius and Aronius, however, cast doubt on their authenticity.

Solomon Katz accepted the authenticity of the first five capitula and attributed the first four to Charlemagne, but the sixth he rejected as forged. François Louis Ganshof accepted the authenticity of the whole collection and tentatively connected the sixth to the reign of Louis the Pious. Amnon Linder rejects any connection with Charlemagne and considers the whole set "probably spurious". Michael Toch also rejects any connection with Charlemagne or any Carolingian royal policy, but accepts the connection with the "ecclesiastical polemics" of Agobard's circle. They are thus of no use as evidence for Jewish economic status. Johannes Heil writes that "there is no reason to doubt the authenticity of any of" the capitula, meaning that they were actual royal law at some point and not forgeries. He hypothesizes their ultimate "elimination from the official canon of Carolingian legislation", analogizing to the case of the Council of Meaux–Paris, which, under the influence of Amulo, passed several anti-Jewish measures only to have them overturned by King Charles the Bald.

== Text ==
The capitula circulated widely and the manuscripts have many variant readings. The original Latin with English translation can be found in Linder. The text of the first four capitula, which are transmitted together, is here taken from the Mediaeval Sourcebook, Capitulary for the Jews, derived in turn from J. P. Migne, ed., Patrologiae Cursus Completus (Paris, 1862), Vol. XCVII, pp. 369–370:

1. Let no Jew presume to take in pledge or for any debt any of the goods of the Church in gold, silver, or other form, from any Christian. But if he presume to do so, which God forbid, let all his goods be seized and let his right hand be cut off.

2. Let no Jew presume to take any Christian in pledge for any Jew or Christian, nor let him do anything worse; but if he presume to do so, let him make reparation according to his law, and at the same time he shall lose both pledge and debt.

3. Let no Jew presume to have a money-changer's table in his house, nor shall he presume to sell wine, grain, or other commodities there. But if it be discovered that he has done so all his goods shall be taken away from him, and he shall be imprisoned until he is brought into our presence.

4. Concerning the oath of the Jews against the Christians. Place sorrel twice around his body from head to feet; he ought to stand when he takes his oath, and he should have in his right hand the five books of Moses according to his law, and if he cannot have them in Hebrew he shall have them in Latin. "May the God who gave the law to Moses on Mount Sinai help me, and may the leprosy of Naamon the Syrian come upon me as it came upon him, and may the earth swallow me as it swallowed Dathan and Abiron, I have not committed evil against you in this cause."

The fifth capitulum is just a variant of the fourth with a different manuscript tradition:

5. Oath of the Jews: I swear to you in God the living and the true and in that holy Law which God gave unto the blessed Moses on Mount Sinai, and in Adonai the Holy, and in the alliance of Abraham that God gave to the children of Israel, and if not, the leprosy of Naaman the Syrian shall envelop my body, and if not, the earth shall swallow me alive, as it did Dathan and Abilon, and in the Ark of the Covenant, which appeared from heaven to the sons of man, and in that holy place where Moses stood, and in that holy [Law] that the blessed Moses received there, that I am not guilty in this case.

The text of the sixth is:

6. If a Jew has any lawsuit against another Jew he shall defend himself according to his own law. However if [the case is] against a Christian, the Christian shall exonerate himself, if necessary, with suitable witnesses. [...] As for the Jew, a necklace of bramble bush shall be put round his neck, his knees shall be tight while standing, and a bramble branch five manual cubits in length well covered with thorns shall be passed forcefully between his hips while he shall terminate his oath; and he shall exonerate himself if he should come out healthy. And if a Jews should do any sorcery against the Christian law or against any Christian [...] He shall either be sewn into the parricide sack and thrown into a deep abyss or burnt in fire.

== Bibliography ==
- Bachrach, Bernard S. (1977). Early Medieval Jewish Policy in Western Europe. University of Minnesota Press.
- Boretius, Alfred, ed. (1883). "Capitula de Iudaeis". Monumenta Germaniae Historica, Capitularia. Vol. 1. Hahn. pp. 258–260.
- Heil, Johannes (2018). "Friendly Barbarians? The Jews under Christian Rule in Northern Europe". In Y. Hen; T. F. X. Noble (eds.). Barbarian and Jews: Jews and Judaism in the Early Medieval West. Diaspora. Vol. 4. Brepols. pp. 203–230. doi:10.1484/m.diaspora-eb.5.115825. ISBN 978-2-503-58101-9.
- Katz, Solomon (1970). The Jews in the Visigothic and Frankish Kingdoms of Spain and Gaul. Concordance Society.
- Linder, Amnon (1997). The Jews in the Legal Sources of the Early Middle Ages. Wayne State University Press.
- Toch, Michael (2012). The Economic History of European Jews: Late Antiquity and Early Middle Ages. Brill.
