= Josef Toch =

Josef Toch (10 March 1908 – 16 November 1983) was an Austrian writer.

== Life ==
Josef Toch was born on 10 March 1908 in Vienna, Austria-Hungary. He was a son of Pauline Steckerl and the Jewish merchant Albert Toch, who was murdered in the Holocaust. Toch attended secondary school in Vienna and the School of Textile Industry in Vienna. He had two siblings. In 1928–29 he trained on a Zionist agricultural farm in Komárov, Moravia, and in 1929 went to Palestine, where he lived in a kibbutz. He returned to Austria in 1932.

Toch joined the Communist Party of Austria, which was banned in 1933 by the Austrofascist government under Engelbert Dollfuß, and worked as an underground party functionary. In 1936 he emigrated to Paris, where he temporarily served as editor of the émigré newspaper Nouvelles d’Autriche. Toch fought as an officer in the International Brigades in the Spanish Civil War. He was interned in France and later fled to England, where at the beginning of the Second World War he was also interned for a time as an "enemy alien" on the Isle of Man.

He worked in agriculture until 1944 and attended a vocational school for the printing trade. Toch was married first to Margarete Baumgarten; the marriage ended in divorce. She was executed in 1942 as a hostage following the assassination of Reinhard Heydrich. His second marriage, to Ruth Wengraf (1918–1985), produced a son, the historian Michael Toch, born in London in 1946. He later married a third time.

Since 1946, Toch lived again in Austria, where he worked as a radio playwright for the Austrian Broadcasting Corporation (ORF) and as a dramaturge at the Neues Theater in der Scala. After the suppression of the Hungarian Uprising in 1956, he left the Communist Party of Austria and joined the Social Democratic Party of Austria in 1959. He worked as an editor for Europa Verlag, in the Tagblatt archive of the Chamber of Labour, and at the Institute for Contemporary History. From 1972 to 1976, he lived once more in Israel. After returning to Austria, he became a contributor to the Catholic weekly Die Furche. He wrote nearly 400 radio broadcasts and radio plays. Toch received the Austrian Theodor Körner Prize in 1960. He died on 16 November 1983 in Vienna, Austria.

== Selected writings ==
- Spanischer Reigen. 1948
- Der Mantel. Novelle. 1954
- Caryl Chessman: Mein Kampf ums Leben. Tatsachenbericht. Übersetzung Josef Toch. Heyne, Munich 1960
- John F. Kennedy: Zivilcourage. Übersetzung Josef Toch. Frick, Vienna 1960
- Vergesellschaftung in Österreich. Von den Anfängen bis heute. Vorwort von Bruno Pittermann. Einleitung Anton Benya. Österreichischer Gewerkschaftsbund, Vienna 1963

== Selected radio plays ==
- 1950: Erdöl – ein besonderer Saft – (ORF)
- 1951: Alexander Herzen – Director: Heinz Schulbaur (ORF)

== Literature ==
- Toch, Josef. In: Werner Röder, Herbert A. Strauss (Hrsg.): Biographisches Handbuch der deutschsprachigen Emigration nach 1933. Band 1: Politik, Wirtschaft, Öffentliches Leben. Saur, Munich 1980, p. 766.
- Toch, Josef. In: Dov Amir: Leben und Werk der deutschen Schriftsteller in Israel: Eine Bio-Bibliographie. Saur, Munich 1980, ISBN 3-598-10070-1, p. 83f.
- Toch, Josef. In: Handbuch österreichischer Autorinnen und Autoren jüdischer Herkunft 18. bis 20. Jahrhundert. Volume 3: S–Z: 8923–11742. Saur, Munich 2002, ISBN 3-598-11545-8, p. 1384.
