= Michael Toch =

Israeli historian (born 1946)

- Born: 1946 (age 79–80); London, England

Academic background
- Education: Hebrew University of Jerusalem; University of Erlangen

Academic work
- Discipline: Medieval history, Jewish economic history
- Institutions: Hebrew University of Jerusalem

Michael Toch (born 10 May 1946) is an Israeli historian and professor emeritus of medieval history at the Hebrew University of Jerusalem. He specialises in the history of the Jews in the Middle Ages and the early modern period in Germany and Europe, the social and economic history of medieval Germany, the history of the peasantry and agriculture, and the history of technology and communication.

== Early life ==
Toch was born in London in 1946, the son of the Austrian writer Josef Toch and Ruth Toch (née Wengraf, 1918–1985). His family returned to Vienna in 1948, where he attended primary and secondary school from 1952 to 1964. In 1964 he moved to Israel, to Kibbutz Magen. He did his military service from 1965 to 1969, and from 1969 to 1975 studied history, philosophy and sociology at the Hebrew University of Jerusalem, where he earned his bachelor's and master's degrees.

== Career ==
From 1974 to 1975 Toch was a tutor in history at Ben-Gurion University, Beersheba. With a doctoral scholarship from the German Academic Exchange Service he wrote a PhD thesis on "The Middle Classes of Nuremberg in the 15th Century" at the University of Erlangen, which awarded the degree magna cum laude in 1978. He then joined the Hebrew University as an instructor in history (1978), becoming lecturer (1980), senior lecturer in medieval history (1986), associate professor (1992) and full professor (1998). He taught at the Hebrew University until his retirement in October 2014.

In 1985–86 he was an Alexander von Humboldt research fellow at the Monumenta Germaniae Historica in Munich. He held visiting appointments at the Hochschule für Jüdische Studien in Heidelberg (1984–85), Clare Hall, Cambridge (1989–90), the University of Trier (1990), the Free University of Berlin (1992), Bielefeld University (1994), the Central European University in Budapest, the University of Vienna and the University of Konstanz (1995), and LMU Munich (2000–01). He was the Jacob Perlov Distinguished Visiting Fellow in Judaic Studies at Yale University (2001) and a fellow of the Historisches Kolleg in Munich (2004–05). In 2008–09 he was an Ellie and Herbert D. Katz Distinguished Fellow at the Herbert D. Katz Center for Advanced Judaic Studies, University of Pennsylvania.

From 1997 he directed the research project Germania Judaica IV, a handbook of Jewish settlement in the German lands from 1520 to 1650. From 2003 he has been a member of the scientific board of the Istituto internazionale di storia economica "F. Datini" in Prato.

== Research ==
Toch's research focuses on the history of the Jews in medieval and early modern Germany and Europe, the social and economic history of medieval Germany, the history of the peasantry and agriculture, and the history of technology and communication. His 1998 volume Die Juden im mittelalterlichen Reich, in the series Enzyklopädie deutscher Geschichte, surveys the history of the Jews of medieval Germany and the scholarship on it; a third, expanded edition appeared in 2013.

In The Economic History of European Jews: Late Antiquity and Early Middle Ages (Brill, 2013) he re-examines the sources for Jewish economic life in Byzantium, Italy, France and Germany, the Iberian Peninsula and Eastern Europe. Against a historiographical tradition that gave Jews a central place in the early medieval European economy, including long-distance "Jewish trade", he argues that Jews were active mainly in regional and household economies and that their economic activity reflected their status as a minority. The book was reviewed in, among others, The Journal of Economic History (Francesca Trivellato, 2014) and Deutsches Archiv für Erforschung des Mittelalters (Wolfram Drews, 2014). An updated Hebrew version was published by the Zalman Shazar Center in 2019.

== Awards and fellowships ==
- Alexander von Humboldt Research Fellowship (1985–86)
- Jacob Perlov Distinguished Visiting Fellowship in Judaic Studies, Yale University (2001)
- Humboldt Research Award (2003)

== Selected publications ==
=== Books ===
- Die Nürnberger Mittelschichten im 15. Jahrhundert. Nürnberg: Stadtarchiv, 1978. ISBN 3-87432-059-6
- Die Juden im mittelalterlichen Reich. Enzyklopädie deutscher Geschichte 44. München: Oldenbourg, 1998. ISBN 3-486-55053-5; 3rd expanded ed., De Gruyter Oldenbourg, 2013. ISBN 978-3-486-71908-6
- Peasants and Jews in Medieval Germany: Studies in Cultural, Social and Economic History. Variorum Collected Studies 757. Aldershot: Ashgate, 2003. ISBN 0-86078-896-2
- The Economic History of European Jews: Late Antiquity and Early Middle Ages. Études sur le judaïsme médiéval 56. Leiden: Brill, 2013. ISBN 978-90-04-23534-2
- Parnasatam shel Yisrael: Yehudim be-kalkalat Eiropa 500–1100 [The Livelihood of Israel: Jews in the Economy of Europe, 500–1100]. Jerusalem: Zalman Shazar Center, 2019. (Hebrew)

=== Edited volumes ===
- Die ältesten Rechnungsbücher des Klosters Scheyern 1339–1363. München: C. H. Beck, 2000. ISBN 3-406-10406-1
- (with Yom Tov Assis, Jeremy Cohen, Ora Limor and Aharon Kedar) Yehudim mul ha-tzlav: Gezerot Tatnav ba-historia u-va-historiografia [Jews Facing the Cross: 1096 in History and Historiography]. Jerusalem: Magnes, 2000. (Hebrew) ISBN 965-493-088-9
- Wirtschaftsgeschichte der mittelalterlichen Juden. Fragen und Einschätzungen. Schriften des Historischen Kollegs 71. München: Oldenbourg, 2008. ISBN 978-3-486-58670-1 (review)
